= Jodel =

French aircraft company

Avions Jodel
- Industry: Aeronautics, defence
- Founded: 1946
- Founder: Édouard Joly and Jean Délémontez
- Headquarters: Blagnac, France
- Products: Aircraft

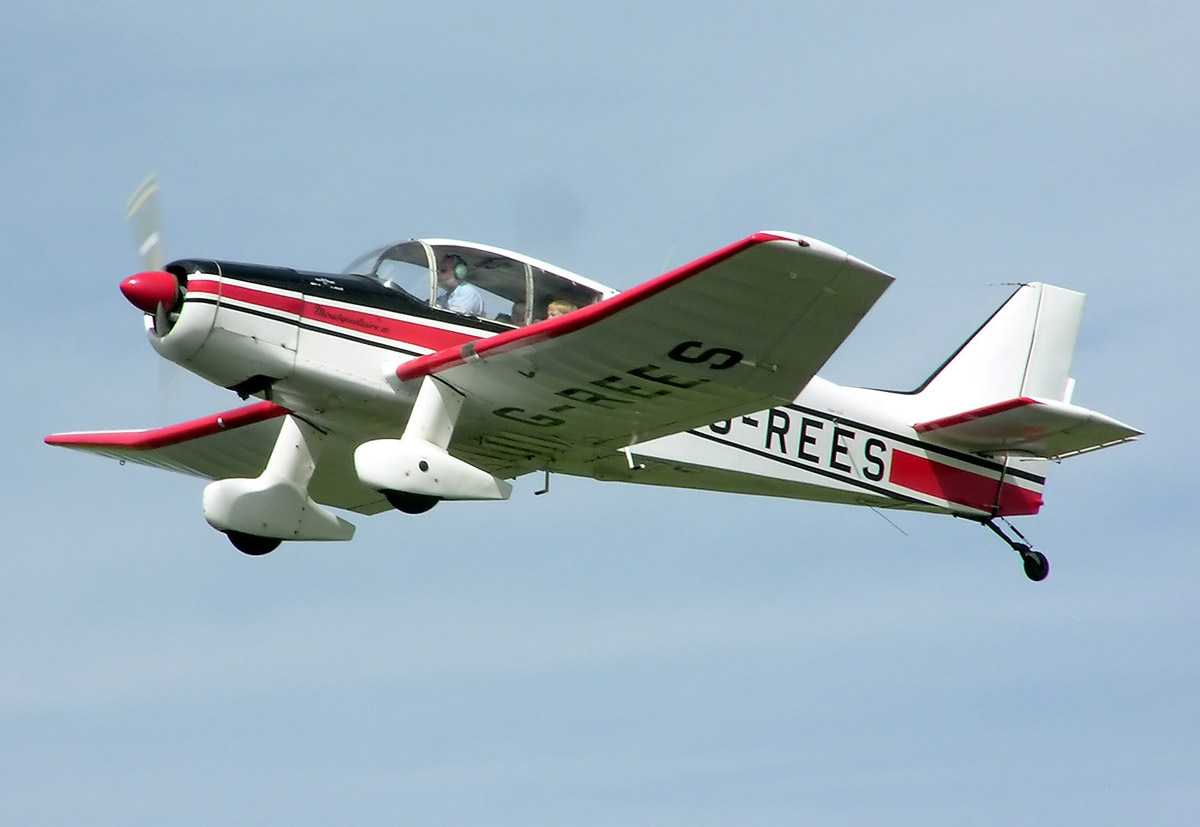
1965 Jodel D140C Mousquetaire

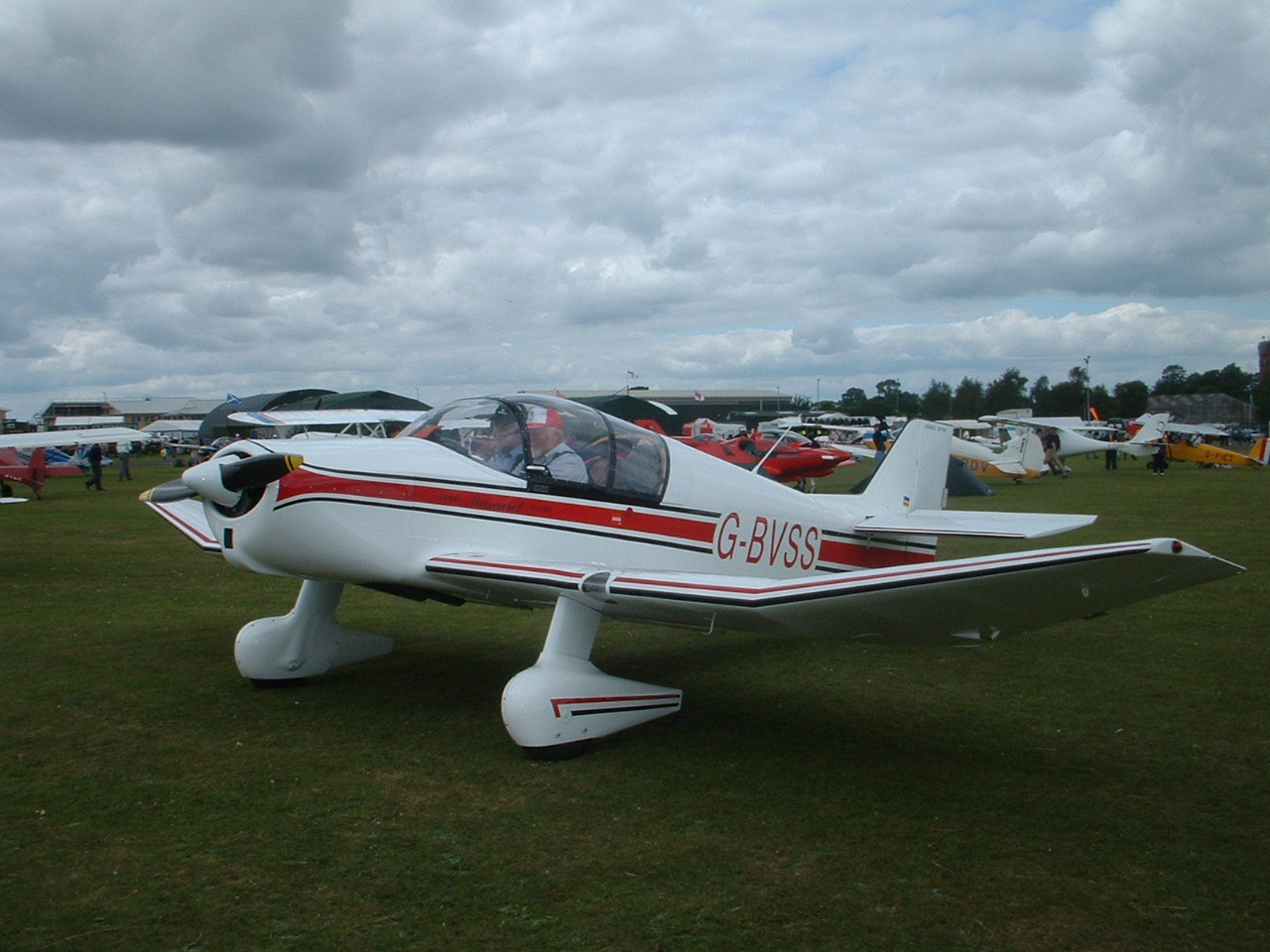
Jodel D150

Société Avions Jodel is a French aircraft company started in 1946 by Édouard Joly and his son-in-law Jean Délémontez.

== History ==
Jodel designed a range of light aeroplanes shortly after the Second World War. Popular myth has it that the two industrialists, with no formal aerodynamics training, set about designing a single-seat aircraft with some spare plywood and a small engine, a Poinsard 25hp 2-cyl. The result was the 1948 D9 Bébé (Baby) model. In fact, the two had much experience of building and designing aircraft, Délémontez being a trained aeronautical engineer, and Joly having built an aircraft before the war.

The French government bought many of the aircraft, with more than 500 D9s being built during the next twenty years. Subsequently, the government expressed interest in a larger aircraft as a trainer and the two-seat D11 model followed in 1950.

Jodel aircraft are all-wood, usually made from Sitka spruce and plywood made out of okoume (also known as gaboon), a kind of West African hardwood. Most of the designs are recognisable by their distinctive wings, which have ‘cranked’ dihedral only on the outer third. The wings also incorporate washout, retaining aileron effectiveness at or just prior to the stall. From above or below, the wings are also distinctive as this cranked section of the wing tapers sharply towards the wingtip.

The designs are popular in France and in Southern Europe, UK, but are little known in the USA. In Australia, the design has been brought up to date somewhat by Frank Rogers who produced new drawings to standards suited to Australian amateur builders.

Jean Délémontez and Pierre Robin went on to form Centre-Est Aéronautique, eventually Robin Aircraft, in October 1957.

== Production under licence ==
Apart from prototypes, Jodels were made by a variety of French aviation manufacturers, but all construction ceased during the 1960s. Since then, the Jodel company has sold licences and detailed plans of its models to amateur builders of homebuilt aircraft.

The Jodel designs were later licensed to the following companies which produced derivative designs that retained the Jodel wing:

- Avions Robin, France
- Aero Difusión, Spain
- Falconar Avia, Canada

== Aircraft ==
The first model was built in 1948. All Jodel planes have been low-wing monoplanes.

- Jodel D9 1948
- Jodel D91 1948
- Jodel D93 1951
- Jodel D11 1950
- Jodel D111 1951
- Jodel D112 1952
- Jodel D113 1960
- Jodel D114 1952
- SAN Jodel D.150 Mascaret 1962
- Jodel D18 1984
- Jodel D19 1986
- Jodel D-20 1990
- Jodel DR1050 Excellence
