= 1962 in aviation =

This is a list of aviation-related events from 1962.

== Events ==
- The United States Navy develops vertical replenishment (VERTREP) techniques to supply ships at sea by helicopter, as Sikorsky HSS-2 Sea King (later redesignated SH-3A Sea King) antisubmarine helicopters from the general stores issue ship USS Altair and fleet oiler USS Mississinewa resupply ships of the United States Sixth Fleet in the Mediterranean.
- On an unrecorded date probably sometime in 1962, scheduled commercial airline flights between the United States and Cuba come to an end. Although historians disagree on the exact date, it apparently occurs after Cuba bans incoming flights during the October 1962 Cuban Missile Crisis. Scheduled commercial airline flights between the two countries will not resume until August 31, 2016.
- The Dominican Republic airline Aerovías Quisqueyana begins operations.
- Early 1962 – In Operation High Jump, the United States Navy McDonnell F4H-1 Phantom II fighter sets a number of world climb-to altitude records: 34.523 seconds to 3,000 meters (9,800 feet), 48.787 seconds to 6,000 meters (20,000 feet), 61.629 seconds to 9,000 meters (30,000 feet), 77.156 seconds to 12,000 meters (39,000 feet), 114.548 seconds to 15,000 meters (49,000 feet), 178.5 seconds to 20,000 meters (66,000 feet), 230.44 seconds to 25,000 meters (82,000 feet), and 371.43 seconds to 30,000 meters (98,000 feet).

=== January ===
- United States Army H-21C Shawnee transport helicopters deploy to Da Nang Air Base, South Vietnam. They are the first American aircraft to operate from Da Nang.
- January 1 – Aden Airways and East African Airways enter into an agreement to pool services on the Aden-Nairobi route.
- January 2 – Piloting Pakistan International Airlines′ first Boeing 720B airliner – a Boeing 720-040B (registration AP-AMG) – on its delivery flight, Captain Abdullah Baig and his copilot, Captain Taimur Baig, set a world record for speed over a commercial air route, flying from London, England, to Karachi, Pakistan, in 6 hours 43 minutes 55 seconds at an average speed of 938.78 km/h (583.33 mph).
- January 9 – The de Havilland DH121 Trident makes its maiden flight from Hatfield in Hertfordshire in the United Kingdom.
- January 10–11 – A United States Air Force B-52H Stratofortress flies from Okinawa to Madrid, establishing a new unrefueled world nonstop flight distance record of 12,532 miles (20,168 km).
- January 15 – The U.S. Army suffers its first combat fatalities in an aircraft in Vietnam when an H-21C Shawnee transport helicopter is shot down by Viet Cong ground fire near Dak Roda, South Vietnam, with three killed.
- January 16 – A Republic of Vietnam Air Force C-47 Skytrain crashes at Pleiku, South Vietnam, killing 33.
- January 24 – Two United States Navy F4H Phantom IIs are seconded to the United States Air Force as the Air Force plans to adopt the type as the F-4 Phantom II.
- January 25 – Winds exceeding 100 miles per hour (160 km/h) shear one of the wings off a Montana Air National Guard Douglas C-47 Skytrain flying in turbulent weather during a snowstorm. It crashes into a mountain canyon near Wolf Creek, Montana, killing all six people on board including Governor of Montana Donald Nutter.

=== February ===
- February 2 – A United States Air Force Fairchild C-123 Provider crashes while spraying defoliant near Biên Hòa, South Vietnam, with the loss of three crew members. It is the first U.S. Air Force aircraft lost in Vietnam.
- February 9 – A U.S. Military Air Transport Service Boeing 707 carrying 159 passengers flies from Hawaii to California in 3 hours 49 minutes, a record time for a commercial-type aircraft.
- February 10 – The Soviet Union exchanges captured American U-2 pilot Francis Gary Powers – shot down over Soviet territory in 1960 – for Vilyam Genrikhovich Fisher, also known as Rudolf Abel, a Soviet spy held by the United States.
- February 12 – French troops discover the mummified body of William N. "Bill" Lancaster and the wreckage of his Avro Mark VIA Avian Southern Cross in the Sahara Desert. Lancaster had disappeared on April 12, 1933, during an attempt to set a world speed record for a flight from England to South Africa. He is determined to have died on April 20, 1933, while awaiting rescue. The wreckage of the aircraft will be recovered in 1975 and placed on exhibit in 1979.
- February 20 – John Glenn becomes the first American astronaut to orbit the Earth in Mercury Atlas 6.
- February 25 – An Avensa Fairchild F27 Friendship crashes into San Juan mountain on Venezuela's Isla Margarita in the Caribbean, killing all 23 people on board.

=== March ===
- Tunisair discontinues its service between Tunis, Tunisia, and Frankfurt-am-Main, West Germany, due to the route's poor economic performance..
- March 1
  - Los Angeles Airways becomes the first civil operator of the Sikorsky S-61 helicopter.
  - American Airlines Flight 1, a Boeing 707-123B, crashes into Jamaica Bay shortly after taking off from Idlewild Airport in New York City, killing all 95 people on board; it is the sixth fatal accident involving a Boeing 707 and the deadliest 707 accident thus far. Among the dead are John Dieckman, an international champion flyfisher and caster; retired Admiral Richard Lansing Conolly, USN, the president of Long Island University and a two-time Deputy Chief of Naval Operations; W. Alton Jones, a multi-millionaire former president and chairman of Cities Service Company and close personal friend of former General of the Army and President of the United States Dwight D. Eisenhower; Arnold Kirkeby, a millionaire realtor and former head of the Kirkeby chain of luxury hotels; Louise Lindner Eastman, whose daughter Linda Eastman would later marry Paul McCartney of The Beatles; Irving Rubine, producer of the film The Guns of Navarone; Emelyn Whiton, a 1952 Olympic sailing gold medalist; and the Broadway stage manager Bob Paschall. In addition, 15 abstract paintings by the artist Arshile Gorky in the plane's cargo hold are destroyed.
- March 2 – The U.S. Federal Aviation Administration forms its Peace Officers Program – a forerunner of the U.S. Federal Air Marshal Service – as the first class of 18 officers graduate from their training program.
- March 4 – Caledonian Airways Flight 153, the Douglas DC-7 Star of Robbie Burns, crashes in a swamp shortly after takeoff from Douala International Airport in Douala, Cameroon, killing all 111 people on board.
- March 5 – The 21st and last Bendix Trophy race across the contiguous United States takes place with two United States Air Force 43rd Bombardment Wing B-58A Hustlers as its only entrants in what the Air Force dubs Operation Heat Rise. The B-58s take off from Carswell Air Force Base, Texas, fly out over the Pacific Ocean, refuel in the air, then pass over Los Angeles, California, to begin the race, with a finish line at New York City, slowing only to refuel from Boeing KC-135 Stratotankers over Kansas. Flying at altitudes between 25,000 and 50,000 feet (7,600 and 15,200 meters), the first B-58A sets a west-to-east transcontinental speed record, completing the flight in 2 hours 58.71 seconds at an average speed of 1,214.71 mph (1,954.89 km/h), beating the second B-58A by one minute and winning the last Bendix Trophy ever awarded for speed. Without landing, the two B-58As then refuel over the Atlantic Ocean and passes over New York City to begin another record-setting transcontinental flight in the opposite direction. Although the second-place B-58A has to land due to mechanical trouble soon after passing New York City, the Bendix Trophy-winning B-58A returns to Los Angeles, setting an east-to-west transcontinental record time of 2 hours, 15 minutes, 50.08 seconds, completing the round trip in 4 hours, 41 minutes, 15 seconds at an average speed of 1,044.46 mph (1,680.90 km/h), another record. For the flight, the B-58A's will receive not only the Bendix Trophy, but also the MacKay Trophy.
- March 8 – A Turkish Airlines Fairchild F-27 crashes in the Bolkar Mountains of the Taurus mountain range in Adana Province, Turkey, killing all 11 people on board.
- March 16 – Flying Tiger Line Flight 739, a Lockheed L-1049H Super Constellation chartered by the United States Military Air Transport Service and carrying 97 United States Army personnel, three South Vietnamese, and a crew of 11, vanishes over the western Pacific Ocean with the loss of all 107 people on board. No wreckage or bodies are ever found.

=== April ===
- April 12 – During a test flight in a P-51 Mustang to practice for an attempt to break the speed record for a flight from Sydney, Australia, to London, England, Scottish racing car driver Ron Flockhart is killed when he loses control of the plane and crashes near Kallista, Victoria, Australia.
- April 15 – The United States Marine Corps' involvement in the Vietnam War begins when Marine Medium Helicopter Squadron 362 (HMM-362), equipped with HUS-1 Seahorse transport helicopters, arrives at Sóc Trăng, South Vietnam, to begin Operation Shufly.
- April 16 – A lone hijacker demands that a KLM Royal Dutch Airlines Douglas DC-7C flying from Amsterdam, the Netherlands, to Lisbon, Portugal, with 52 passengers aboard divert to East Berlin, East Germany. The airliner instead returns to Schiphol Airport outside Amsterdam.
- April 21 – Flying at the Soviet Union′s Sternberg Point Observatory, the Tupolev Tu-114 (NATO reporting name "Cleat") airliner 76467, piloted by Ivan Sukhomlin and copiloted by Piotr Soldatov, sets a world speed record for a turboprop landplane over a 10,000 km (6,200 mi) closed circuit carrying a payload of between 1,000 and 10,000 kg (2,200 and 22,000 lb), averaging 737.352 km/h (458.169 mph).
- April 22 – Flying an Antonov An-10A, Soviet pilot A. Mitronin sets a world speed record over a 500-kilometer (310-mile) closed loop for aircraft in the An-10's class, averaging 730.6 km/h (454.0 mph).
- April 25 – The United States Department of Defense announces its choice of the Northrop F-5 Freedom Fighter for its Military Assistance Program.
- April 26 – Louis Schalk pilots the first unofficial flight of the A-12 Article 121.
- April 30 – Louis Schalk pilots the first official flight of the A-12 Article 121.
- Late April – The U.S. Army's 57th Medical Detachment (Helicopter Ambulance) arrives at Nha Trang Air Base, South Vietnam, introducing the Bell HU-1 Iroquois helicopter into combat for the first time. Nicknamed the "Huey", the UH-1 (as the HU-1 will be redesignated in September 1962) will become iconic of the Vietnam War.

=== May ===
- Trans World Airlines opens the TWA Flight Center, also known as the Trans World Flight Center, at Idlewild Airport in Queens, New York.
- May 2 – Piloting the HMPAC Puffin – which is powered by the pilot pedaling to spin its propeller – John Wimpenny sets a world record for flight in a human-powered aircraft, flying 993 yards (908 m) at Hatfield Aerodrome in Hatfield, Hertfordshire, England. The record will stand for ten years.
- May 4–5 – During the Carupanazo revolt against Venezuelan President Rómulo Betancourt, Venezuelan Air Force aircraft attack rebel positions at Carúpano.
- May 22 – To kill himself and allow his family to collect his life insurance payment, passenger Thomas G. Doty detonates a dynamite bomb in a rear lavatory of Continental Airlines Flight 11, a Boeing 707-124, near Centerville, Iowa, blowing off the tail section of the plane. The aircraft crashes near Unionville, Missouri, killing Doty and all of the other 44 people on board. United States Medal of Freedom recipient Fred P. Herman is among the dead.

=== June ===
- June 2 – During the Porteñazo revolt of the Venezuelan Marine Corps against Venezuelan President Rómulo Betancourt, Venezuelan Air Force aircraft attack marine corps positions at Puerto Cabello.
- June 3 – The Boeing 707-328 Chateau de Sully, operating as Air France Flight 007, crashes shortly after take-off from Paris-Orly Airport in Paris, killing 130 of the 132 people on board in the deadliest single-aircraft disaster to date.
- June 6 – A helicopter pilot discovers the wreckage of the Fairchild 24 floatplane of Canadian National Hockey League player Bill Barilko of the Toronto Maple Leafs and his dentist, Henry Hudson, who had disappeared while flying back to Toronto from a weekend fishing trip on the Seal River in northern Ontario, Canada, on August 26, 1951. The wreckage is about 100 kilometers (62 miles) north of Cochrane, Ontario, about 56 kilometers (35 miles) off course.
- June 18 – To reduce the chances of Viet Cong forces slipping away from large South Vietnamese ground units by fleeing operations areas in small groups, U.S. Marine Corps helicopters operating in South Vietnam begin to use the "Eagle Flight" tactic, in which Marine transport helicopters circle contested areas and drop off South Vietnamese troops when and where they are needed to block escaping Viet Cong forces. It will become a proven tactic by the middle of July.
- June 19 – Four West German Air Force Lockheed F-104 Starfighters collide and crash, killing all four pilots.
- June 22
  - Flying a Dassault Mirage IIIC over a 100-kilometer (62-mile) closed circuit at Istres, France, French aviator Jacqueline Auriol sets a women's world speed record of 1,850.2 km/h (1,149.7 mph).
  - While on final approach to land at Pointe-à-Pitre, Guadeloupe, Air France Flight 117, a Boeing 707-328, strays 15 km (9.3 mi) off course and crashes 25.5 km (15.8 mi) west-northwest of the airport, killing all 113 people on board. It is Air France's second Boeing 707 disaster of the month.
- June 30 – An errant anti-aircraft missile that has gone astray during a Soviet air defense exercise accidentally shoots down Aeroflot Flight SSSR-42370, a Tupolev Tu-104, over Beryozovsky District, Krasnoyarsk Krai, in the Soviet Union's Russian Soviet Federated Socialist Republic. All 84 people on board die in the subsequent crash.

=== July ===
- The Portuguese airline Transportes Aéreos Portugueses (TAP) – the future TAP Portugal – acquires three Sud Aviation Caravelles, its first jet airliners.
- July 7 – A Soviet Air Force Mikoyan-Gurevich Ye-152 sets a new airspeed record of 2,681 km/h (1,666 mph)
- July 8 – Alitalia Flight 771, a Douglas DC-8-43, crashes 11 km (6.8 mi) northwest of Junnar, India, while on approach to a landing at Bombay 84 km (52 mi) to the northeast. All 94 people on board die.
- July 17 – U.S. Air Force Major Robert M. White pilots a North American X-15 to a record altitude of 314,750 feet (59.6 miles, 96 km). He reaches a maximum speed of 3,784 mph (6,093 km/h) during the flight.
- July 19 – United Arab Airlines Flight 869, a de Havilland DH-106 Comet 4C, crashes on Khao Yai mountain in Thailand while on approach to Bangkok, killing all 26 people on board.
- July 22 – The Bristol Britannia Empress of Lima, operating as Canadian Pacific Air Lines Flight 301, experiences problems with an engine just after takeoff from Honolulu International Airport in Honolulu, Hawaii. Returning to the airport on three engines, it aborts its first landing attempt and begins a go around, during which it crashes, killing 27 of the 40 people on board. It is the worst commercial air accident and second-worst aviation accident in the history of Hawaii.
- July 25 – On Okinawa, the U.S. Army forms its first armed helicopter company, the Utility Tactical Transport Helicopter Company (UTTHCO) using Bell HU-1A ("Huey") helicopters equipped with machine guns and air-to-ground rockets. They are the first attack helicopters.
- July 28 – Aeroflot Flight 415, an Antonov An-10A on a domestic flight, crashes near Gagra, Abkhaz ASSR due to crew and air traffic control errors killing all 81 passengers and crew on board including nuclear physicist Natan Yavlinsky.

=== August ===
- August 1 – The U.S. Marine Corps loses a helicopter in Vietnam for the first time when a Republic of Vietnam Air Force fighter skids off a runway at Sóc Trăng Airfield, South Vietnam, and damages an HUS-1 Seahorse transport helicopter beyond repair.
- August 4 – Yemen Airlines, the future Yemenia, receives its operating license, becoming the flag carrier of the Yemen Arab Republic, also known as North Yemen.
- August 24 – In Iowa, Don Piccard sets a world altitude record for second-class balloons of 17,000 feet (5,200 meters) during a flight of 2 hours 2 minutes from Sioux City to Kennebec.
- August 29 – An American Lockheed U-2 photographs the entire island of Cuba, revealing for the first time the presence of eight Soviet surface-to-air missile sites along Cuba's northwest coast designed to provide strategic air defense of Cuba from the United States.
- August 30 – Two Cuban patrol boats fire on a U.S. Navy Grumman S2F Tracker with a crew of three United States Naval Reserve personnel on a training flight 15 nautical miles (28 kilometres) off Cárdenas, Cuba.
- August 31 – The U.S. Navy conducts its last blimp flight at Naval Air Station Lakehurst, marking the end of its airship program.

=== September ===
- September 6 – Merpati Nusantara Airlines is founded and begins flight operations.
- September 8 – Two Cuban MiG-17 (NATO reporting name "Fresco") fighters make simulated firing runs against two U.S. Navy S2F Tracker aircraft over international waters. Two F4H-1 Phantom II fighters of U.S. Navy Fighter Squadron 41 (VF-41) scramble from Key West, Florida, to intercept, but the MiG-17s flee before the Phantoms can arrive.
- September 14 – Over Edwards Air Force Base, California, a United States Air Force B-58A-10-CF Hustler reaches an altitude of 26,017.93 meters (85,360.7 feet) carrying a 5,000 kg (11,000 lb) payload. The flight sets two new world records, breaking the altitude record for a flight carrying a 5,000 kg (11,000 lb) payload and for a flight carrying a 2,000 kg (4,400 lb) payload.
- September 18
  - By order of the United States Department of Defense, the United States Armed Forces begin use of a unified designation system, the 1962 United States Tri-Service aircraft designation system, for their aircraft. The biggest change is that the Department of the Navy's designation system employed by the U.S. Navy, Marine Corps, and Coast Guard is abandoned, with all aircraft brought under the system employed by the U.S. Air Force and U.S. Army.
  - U.S. Marine Corps helicopters fly a combat mission from Da Nang Air Base, South Vietnam, for the first time, airlifting South Vietnamese troops into the hills south of Da Nang.
- September 23 – Flying Tiger Line Flight 923, a Lockheed L-1049H Super Constellation registered as N6923C, ditched into the Atlantic Ocean after three of the four engines failed. The subsequent ditching killed 28 of the 76 occupants on board. The remaining 48 were rescued six hours after the ditching.

=== October ===
- The U.S. Army begins a six-month test of the Bell UH-1 Iroquois in an armed escort role, evaluating the operations of the Utility Tactical Transport Helicopter Company's operations escorting CH-21C Shawnee transport helicopters in South Vietnam. It is the first combat evaluation of the value of attack helicopters.
- Convair delivers the last of 116 B-58 Hustlers to the United States Air Force.
- October 1
  - U.S. Chief of Naval Operations Admiral George W. Anderson, Jr., begins preparation of a plan for air strikes against known Soviet missile bases in Cuba, with orders to have the plans ready by October 20.
  - Trans World Airlines inaugurates the use of a fully automated Doppler radar navigation system on scheduled transatlantic flights. The first flight to use the system, which flies from New York City to London, makes the first transatlantic crossing by a commercial or military aircraft without a professional navigator aboard in history.
- October 6
  - The U.S. Marine Corps and U.S. Navy suffer their first helicopter fatalities in Vietnam when a Marine Corps UH-34 Seahorse crashes 15 miles (24 km) from Tam Ky, South Vietnam, killing five Marines and two Navy personnel.
  - American inventor, businessman, adventurer, cryptozoologist, and heir to an oil fortune Tom Slick dies when his Beechcraft Bonanza 35 crashes near Dell, Montana, during his return to Texas from a hunting trip in Canada.
- October 7 – Clement Miller, a member of the United States House of Representatives representing California's 1st Congressional District, dies during an election campaign flight when his Piper Avalanche crashes into Chaparral Mountain near Eureka, California, during a storm. The other two people on board also are killed.
- October 9 – A PLUNA Douglas C-47A Skytrain on a test flight crashes during takeoff from Carrasco International Airport in Montevideo, Uruguay, and catches fire, killing all 10 people on board.
- October 14 – A U.S. Air Force Lockheed U-2 reconnaissance flight over Cuba reveals the presence of launchpads for medium-range ballistic missiles, triggering the Cuban Missile Crisis.
- October 22 – President John F. Kennedy announces a naval blockade – termed a "quarantine" – of Cuba, and U.S. military forces worldwide are ordered to Defense Condition (DEFCON) 2. The U.S. Navy has 250 aircraft cooperating with 46 ships in blockading Cuba; the attack aircraft carriers USS Enterprise (CVA(N)-65) and USS Independence (CVA-62) and the antisubmarine carriers USS Essex (CVS-9) and USS Randolph (CVS-15) are among the ships taking part. The United States has a combined 156 aircraft in Florida poised to strike targets in Cuba, capable of flying an estimated nearly 1,200 sorties on the first day of such strikes.
- October 23 – In Operation Blue Moon, six U.S. Navy RF-8 Crusader photographic reconnaissance aircraft flying from Key West, Florida, conduct the first American low-level flights over Cuba, flying at 400 mph (640 km/h) only a few hundred feet off the ground.
- October 24
  - The U.S. Joint Chiefs of Staff order the U.S. military forces worldwide to Defense Condition (DEFCON) 2, with preparations to strike Cuba, the Soviet Union, or both. The U.S. Air Force has 1,436 strategic bombers and 134 intercontinental ballistic missiles on constant alert, with one-eighth of the bombers airborne at all times.
  - U.S. Chief of Naval Operations Admiral George W. Anderson, Jr., asks the U.S. Air Force to assist in providing aerial surveillance of the sea approaches to Cuba. Chief of Staff of the United States Air Force General Curtis LeMay agrees to do so, adding that Air Force Strategic Air Command crews will find all Soviet shipping in the area in four hours. Several B-52 Stratofortress bombers and RB-47K Stratojet weather reconnaissance aircraft and 16 Boeing KC-97 Stratofreighter aerial tankers make surveillance flights, but their crews' inexperience in maritime reconnaissance leads them to report American, British, and Greek cargo ships as Soviet ones.
- October 26
  - Boeing delivers the last B-52 Stratofortress off the production line to the U.S. Air Force.
  - Convair delivers the last B-58 Hustler, a B-58A-20-CF, serial number 61-20280, to the U.S. Air Force. The production run ends after the construction of 116 B-58s. The B-58 is the world's only supersonic bomber.
- October 27 – A U-2 of the U.S. Air Force's 4080th Strategic Wing piloted by Major Rudolf Anderson. Jr., is shot down over Cuba, killing Anderson. Anderson posthumously will become the first recipient of the Air Force Cross.

=== November ===
- The British and French governments agree to collaboration between British Aircraft Corporation and Sud-Aviation in the development of a supersonic airliner. The agreement will lead to the development of the Concorde.
- A model of the UH-1B Iroquois helicopter specifically modified at the factory to serve in an attack helicopter role – the first such U.S. Army helicopter – begins to arrive in South Vietnam.
- U.S. Marine Corps transport helicopters in South Vietnam begin to employ "Tiger Flight" tactics, in which Marine Corps helicopters fly to nearby bases to embark South Vietnamese troops as a quick-reaction force to reinforce ground operations.
- November 1 – Soviet Airborne Forces Colonel Pyotr Dolgov and Soviet Air Force Major Yevgeny Andreyev ascend in the gondola of a Volga balloon near Volsk in the Soviet Union to attempt high-altitude parachute jumps. When Dolgov, testing an experimental pressure suit, exits the gondola at an altitude of 28,640 metres (93,963 ft) near Saratov, the suit's helmet visor hits the gondola and the suit depressurizes, killing him. Andreyev jumps at 25,458 metres (83,524 ft), also near Saratov, and free-falls 24,500 metres (80,381 ft) before successfully deploying his parachute. Although Andreyev does not break the record for the highest parachute jump held by Joseph Kittinger, Kittinger's jump was stabilized by a drogue parachute, so Andreyev sets the world record for the longest true free-fall jump, previously also held by Kittinger, that stands until Felix Baumgartner breaks it in 2012. Both Dolgov and Andreyev will receive the Hero of the Soviet Union award, Dolgov posthumously, on 12 December.
- November 9 – A serious landing accident virtually destroys North American X-15 56-6671 and injures National Aeronautics and Space Administration (NASA) pilot John B. McKay.
- November 18 – President John F. Kennedy lifts the blockade ("quarantine") of Cuba.
- November 19 – The first scheduled airline flight – an Eastern Air Lines Lockheed Super Electra turboprop from Newark International Airport in Newark, New Jersey – arrives at Washington Dulles International Airport in Virginia outside Washington, D.C.
- November 23 – United Airlines Flight 297, a Vickers Viscount 754D, strikes a flock of whistling swans at an altitude of 6,000 feet (1,829 meters) and crashes north of what would later become Columbia, Maryland, killing all 17 people on board.
- November 27 – Boeing rolls out the first Boeing 727 airliner at its Renton, Washington, plant.
- November 30 – Eastern Air Lines Flight 512, a Douglas DC-7B, crashes while trying to land in heavy fog at Idlewild Airport in New York City. Twenty-five of the 51 people on board die.

=== December ===
- December 8 – British troops are airlifted to Borneo to quell uprisings in the region.
- December 15 – The U.S. Navy reports that the last Soviet offensive weapons – 15 crated Ilyushin Il-28 (NATO reporting name "Beagle") bombers – have been removed from Cuba.

== First flights ==
- Cessna 160

=== January ===
- January 9 – Hawker Siddeley Trident
- January 14 – Linn Mini Mustang
- January 23 – Tupolev Tu-126 (NATO reporting name "Moss")

=== February ===
- February 6 – DINFIA F.A.1 Guarini I

=== March ===
- March 23
  - Merville D.63
  - Pazmany PL-1
- March 27 – Piaggio P.166B

=== April ===
- April 14 – Bristol Type 188
- April 26 – Lockheed A-12

=== May ===
- May 1 – Wing Derringer N3621G
- May 9 – Sikorsky S-64
- May 30 – Sukhoi Su-15

=== June ===
- Jovair J-2
- June 29
  - Dornier Do 32
  - Vickers VC10 G-ARTA

=== July ===
- July 7 – Lockheed XV-4 Hummingbird
- July 16 – Lightning F.3, third production model of the English Electric Lightning
- July 18 – Cessna 411

=== August ===
- Kawasaki KH-4
- August 10 – Bell 533
- August 12 – Beagle B.206Y, fully developed seven-seat prototype of the Beagle Basset
- August 13 – Hawker Siddeley HS.125 G-ARYA
- August 19 – Beagle B.218 G-ASCK

=== September ===
- September 19 – Aero Spacelines Pregnant Guppy

=== October ===
- October 12 – Dassault Balzac (tethered flight) (First non-tethered flight October 18)
- October 16 – Boeing Vertol CH-46 Sea Knight (a CH-46A model)
- October 28 – Westland Wasp

=== November ===
- November 2 – Lockheed XH-51
- November 7 – SIPA Antilope
- November 7 – Piper PA-30 Twin Comanche

=== December ===
- December 7 – Aérospatiale SA 321 Super Frelon
- December 8 – Bell OH-4
- December 22 – Lockheed A-12
- December 24 – Aérospatiale N 262

== Entered service ==
- Antonov An-24 ("Coke") with Aeroflot (crew training only)

=== March ===
- Aviation Traders Carvair with British United Air Ferries
- March 18 – Convair CV-990 with American Airlines

=== June ===
- McDonnell F4H-1 Phantom II with United States Marine Corps All-Weather Marine Fighter Squadron 314 (VMF(AW)-314)

=== July ===
- July 1 – Boeing Vertol 107 with New York Airways

=== October ===
- October 2 – Tupolev Tu-124 (NATO reporting name "Cookpot") with Aeroflot

== Retirements ==
- September 12 – McDonnell F2H-3 Banshee by the Royal Canadian Navy, the last F2H Banshee user; the F2H-3 is also the last carrier-based fixed-wing strike aircraft ever deployed by the military of Canada

== Deadliest crash ==
The deadliest crash of this year was Air France Flight 007, a Boeing 707 which crashed during takeoff at Orly Airport in Paris, France on 3 June, killing 130 of the 132 people on board.
