= D91 =

D91 may refer to:

- HMS Nottingham (D91)
- HMS Stalker (D91)
- HMS Viceroy (D91)
- Jodel D.91, French single-seat ultralight monoplane

== See also ==
- D. 91, Two Minuets for piano by Franz Schubert (1813)
