= Gatard Statoplan Alouette =

1950s French aircraft

AG 01 Statoplan Alouette

General information
- Type: Sports plane
- Manufacturer: Homebuilt
- Designer: Albert Gatard

History
- First flight: 1951

The Gatard Statoplan AG 01 Statoplan Alouette was a light, two-seat sports airplane developed in France in the early 1950s and marketed for homebuilding.

== Design ==
It was a high-wing cantilever monoplane of short-coupled design with fixed tailwheel undercarriage. Construction was a plywood-covered wooden structure throughout. The variable-incidence horizontal stabiliser was fitted with small endplates to provide extra directional stability but there were no separate elevators.

== Specifications ==
Data from

General characteristics

- Crew: two
- Length: 4.60 m (15 ft 1 in)
- Wingspan: 8.00 m (26 ft 3 in)
- Empty weight: 200 kg (441 lb)
- Max takeoff weight: 380 kg (838 lb)
- Powerplant: 1 × modified Poinsard air-cooled flat-four, 24 kW (32 hp)
- Propellers: 2-bladed Gatard fixed-pitch wooden propeller

Performance

- Maximum speed: 138 km/h (86 mph, 75 kn)
- Cruise speed: 105 km/h (65 mph, 57 kn)
