= AMA motor-glider =

General information
- Type: Motor glider
- National origin: Poland
- Designer: Andrzej Anczutin, Henryk Malinowski and Rościslaw Aleksandrowicz
- Number built: 1

History
- First flight: August 1935

The AMA, named after its designers, was a one-off motor glider built in Poland in the mid-1930s. Its development was abandoned after early tests revealed incurable engine-mounting vibration problems.

== Development ==
Until the mid-1930s, the Polish government had supported amateur aeronautical activity. The end of this support forced designers to consider low cost powered gliders and other small, low powered, structurally simple aircraft. The AMA, a powered glider designed by Andrzej Anczutin, Henryk Malinowski and Rościslaw Aleksandrowicz from the Warsaw Technical University, was one of many such designs.

Its first flight, made in August 1935 and piloted by Szczepan Grzeszczyk, was as a glider towed by an RWD 8. It was first flown under its own power by Aleksander Onoszko on 13 September 1935. Over the next two days it was flown by Kazimierz Chorzewski in displays celebrating the start of the Warsaw-based 23rd Gordon-Bennett Championships.

These flights revealed two significant problems: stability and engine vibration. The former was reduced by empennage modifications, but the latter proved incurable. Development was abandoned after only six powered flights.

== Design ==
The AMA was a high wing monoplane with a wooden structure. Its wing was in three parts, a short, partly metal skinned centre section and two outer panels of constant chord and thickness out to rounded, thinned tips. The outer panels were built around a single box spar with a ply-covered D-box ahead, forming the leading edge. Elsewhere the wing was fabric covered. Ailerons reached to the wing tips. The wing was supported centrally on a streamlined pylon and braced on each side with a single, streamlined steel strut between spar and lower fuselage longeron.

Its 25 kW (34 hp) Poinsard air-cooled flat twin engine was mounted in pusher configuration over the wing above the central pylon, an arrangement used earlier on the BAC Planette.

The fuselage of the AMA was rectangular in section, cross-braced with wire and fabric covered, with a single-seat, open cockpit immediately ahead of the wing pylon. The fixed empennage surfaces were covered with ply, and the control surfaces with fabric. Together, the tall fin and rudder had a blunted triangular profile. The AMA's low, divided-type undercarriage placed the fuselage underside close to the ground, with each wheel on a V-strut hinged on the lower fuselage longeron and a bracing strut to the upper fuselage. These struts were rigid, and the AMA relied on 270 mm (10.63 in) Dunlop low-pressure tyres to absorb landing shocks.

== Specifications ==
Data from General from J. Cynk, 1971, performance from Samolotypolskie

General characteristics

- Crew: One
- Length: 6.4 m (21 ft 0 in)
- Wingspan: 10.5 m (34 ft 5 in)
- Height: 1.5 m (4 ft 11 in)
- Wing area: 16 m^{2} (170 sq ft)
- Empty weight: 170 kg (375 lb)
- Gross weight: 290 kg (639 lb)
- Powerplant: 1 × Poinsard air-cooled flat twin engine, 25 kW (34 hp)
- Propellers: 2-bladed wooden pusher

Performance

- Stall speed: 55 km/h (34 mph, 30 kn)
- Maximum glide ratio: 1:14
- Rate of climb: 1.0 m/s (200 ft/min)
- Rate of sink: 1.4 m/s (280 ft/min) minimum
