= SAN Jodel D.150 Mascaret =

Jodel D.150 Mascaret
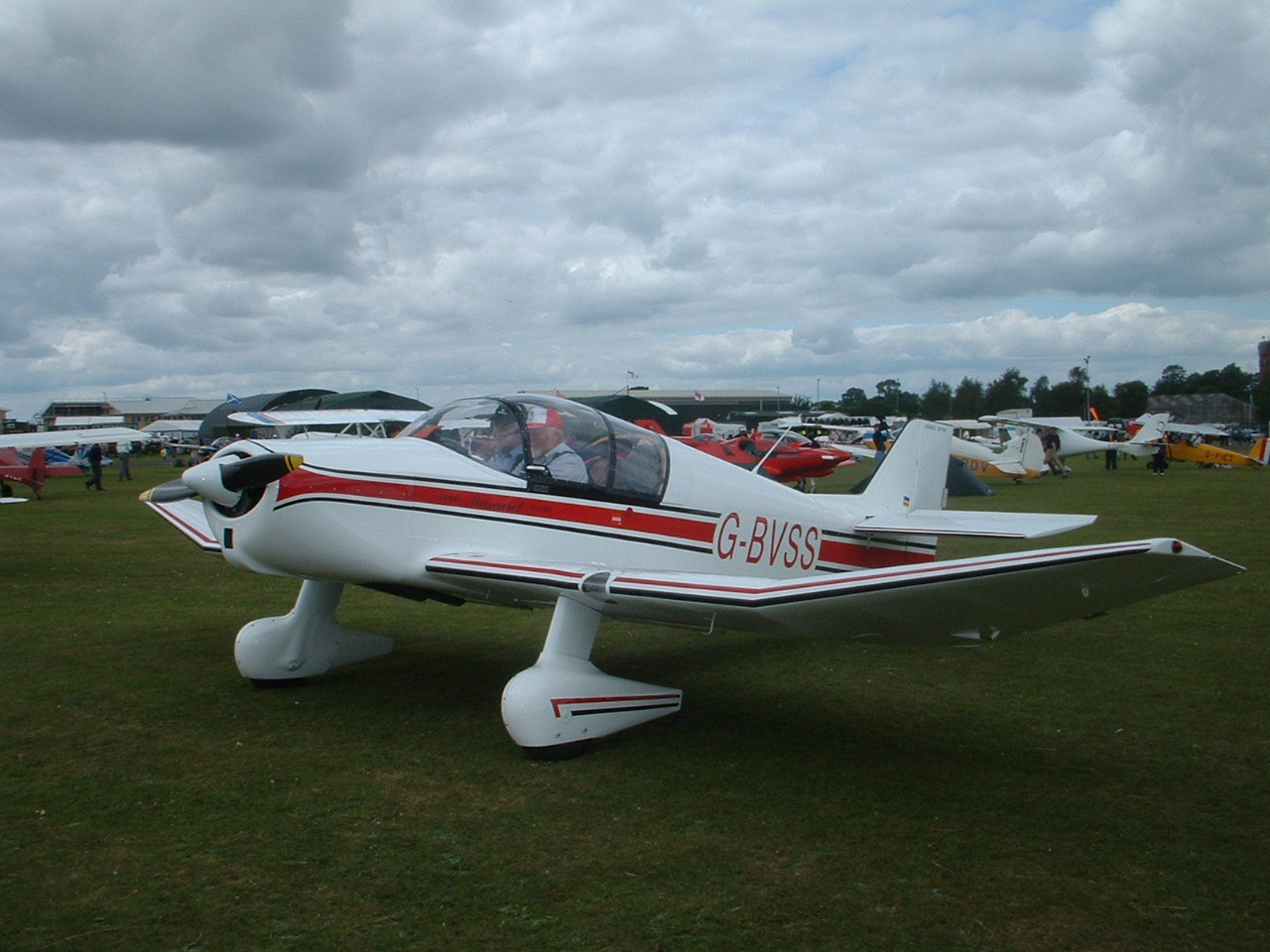
- D.150 at Cranfield

General information
- Type: Two-seat light aircraft
- National origin: France
- Manufacturer: Société Aéronautique Normande (SAN)
- Number built: 61 (Factory built); 100+ (homebuilt)

History
- Introduction date: 1963
- First flight: 2 June 1962

The Jodel D.150 Mascaret is a French two-seat single-engined light aircraft of the 1960s built by Société Aéronautique Normande (SAN) as a replacement for the earlier Jodel D11 trainer/tourer aircraft.

== Development and design ==
In 1961, Jean Délémontez designed a two-seat light aircraft for the Société Aeronautique Normande (SAN) at Bernay in Normandy to replace his earlier Jodel D.11, which SAN (amongst other manufacturers) were building to meet a requirement for aircraft to equip flying clubs subsidised by the French government. Délémontez based the new design on his three–four seat Jodel Ambassadeur, (also being built by SAN), with a reduced span wing and shorter fuselage.

The new aircraft, the D.150 Mascaret - named after a tidal bore first flew on 2 June 1962, production beginning in 1963.

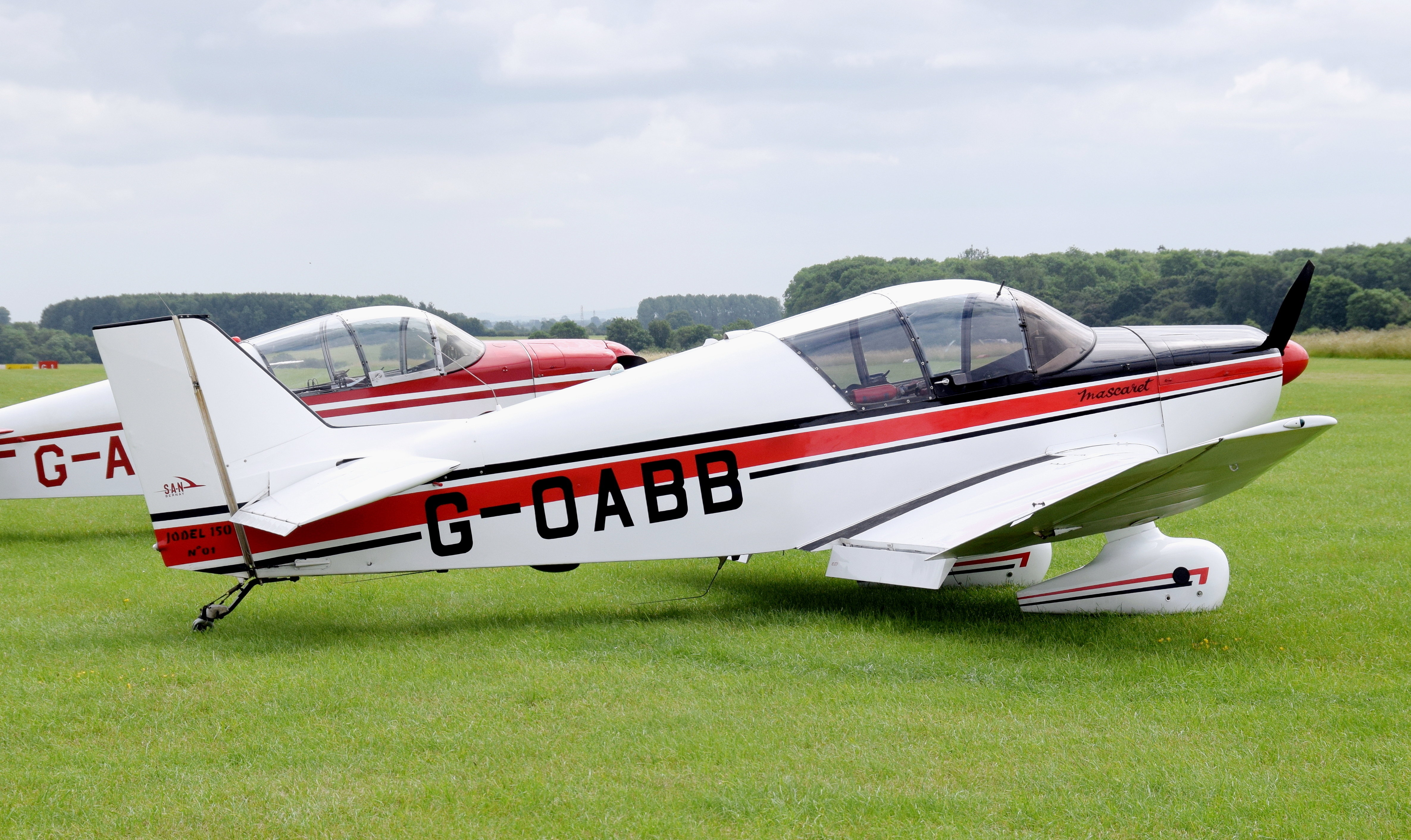
SAN Jodel D.150 Mascaret (built 1962)

Like all the light aircraft that Délémontez designed under the Jodel and Robin names, the D.150 is a low-winged monoplane of wooden construction, with distinctive upturned outer wings. The D.150 was the first Jodel fitted with an all-moving tail, later fitted on larger models such as DR.1051 model (Sicile Record). It has a fixed tailwheel undercarriage, with its crew of two sitting side by side under a two-door canopy. It was offered with the same range of engines as the larger Ambassadeur, giving a good performance for a two-seat trainer/tourer.

== Operational history ==
Sixty-one D.150s had been completed by 1969, when SAN went into liquidation, the factory being brought by Avions Mudry.Plans for homebuilt construction of the Mascaret remain available, over 100 having been built, including completion of an unfinished factory airframe.

== Variants ==
D.150 Mascaret
Basic version, powered by 75 kW (100 hp) Rolls-Royce Continental O-200 engine, 39 factory built.
D.150A Mascaret
Version powered by 78 kW (105 hp) Potez 4E engine, 22 factory built.

== Specifications (D.150 100 hp Continental) ==
Data from Jane's All The World's Aircraft 1965-66

General characteristics

- Crew: 2
- Length: 6.30 m (20 ft 8 in)
- Wingspan: 8.15 m (26 ft 9 in)
- Height: 1.76 m (5 ft 9 in)
- Wing area: 13.10 m^{2} (141.0 sq ft)
- Empty weight: 414 kg (913 lb)
- Max takeoff weight: 720 kg (1,587 lb)
- Fuel capacity: 187 L
- Powerplant: 1 × Rolls-Royce Continental O-200-A air-cooled flat-four, 75 kW (100 hp)

Performance

- Maximum speed: 241 km/h (150 mph, 130 kn) at sea level
- Cruise speed: 214 km/h (133 mph, 116 kn) (75% power)
- Stall speed: 80 km/h (50 mph, 43 kn)
- Range: 1,610 km (1,000 mi, 870 nmi)
- Endurance: 8 hours
- Service ceiling: 4,875 m (15,994 ft)
- Rate of climb: 4.1 m/s (800 ft/min)
