= Avia 60-MP =

Single-seat French motor glider, 1936

General information
- Type: Motor glider; advanced training glider
- National origin: France
- Manufacturer: Avia (Ateliers vosgiens d'industrie aéronautique)
- Number built: 1

History
- Developed from: Avia 32-E

The Avia 60-MP was a French motor glider with a wing based on that of the Avia 32-E, an advanced training glider. It was intended as both an advanced trainer and as an atmospheric research aircraft.

== Design and development ==
In 1933 Avia introduced two designs based on their earlier training gliders but fitted with low powered engines, placing them amongst the first motor gliders. Both were based on earlier Avia true gliders; the Avia 60-MP (MP for moteur planeur or motor glider) was the more advanced of the two and was a development of the Avia 32-E. It was intended as a suitable aircraft for pilots wishing to go beyond the B brevet to the C and was also intended to map the vertical thermal structure of the atmosphere, crucial to glider flight but not well known at the time.

The Avia 60-MP had a gull wing with its roots attached to the lower fuselage and with linearly tapered inner sections of increasing chord and strong dihedral. These inner sections extended over about 30% of the span to an elbow where the dihedral was much reduced and the wing plan became convergent straight tapered to rounded tips, carrying long differential ailerons. The wings were built around single box spars and had plywood covering around the leading edge, with the rest of the wing fabric covered. Each wing was braced with a pair of sloping V-struts between two points on the upper wing surface at the elbow to a long, narrow central streamlined pillar, roughly rectangular in profile. In this respect, at least, the completed 60-HP differed from the earlier drawings, which showed parallel struts.

This pillar also mounted the Avia's 19 kW (25 hp) pusher configuration Poinsard flat twin engine with its cylinder heads exposed for air-cooling. A 1.60 m (5 ft 3 in) diameter propeller rotated over the wing behind the rear bracing strut within the inner section of the wing. The fuselage was built around four spruce longerons, with formers to round the cross section, and was ply covered. The Avia's single, open cockpit was immediately ahead of the central pillar in a forward fuselage with a roughly prolate elliptical section. Aft of the pillar the fuselage was more slender and flatter sided. The horizontal tail was mounted on a small step with a curved leading edge; the straight swept tailplane was little more than a faired hinge for full, tapered, balanced and elliptically tipped elevators. Its fin was also small, with a tall, deep curved rudder that extended to the keel; the elevator hinge was well forward of that of the rudder, so only a small cut-away in the elevator trailing edges was needed for rudder movement. The fixed parts of the empennage were covered with ply and the control surfaces with fabric. It landed on a conventional skid, with a pair of retractable wheels to aid ground handling.

The Avia 60-HP's first flight was made from Saint-Cyr at the beginning of April 1936 or shortly before. The three-year delay between the 1933 first design and completion was largely due to Avia's financial difficulties. The motor-glider also appeared at a meeting at Saint-Germain on 17 May but was seriously damaged on 28 June 1936 after an in-flight engine fire. Its pilot, Nessler, made an emergency landing and the airframe was stored but destroyed early in World War II. It was advertised amongst the light aircraft at the December 1936 Paris Salon, though two years later a commentator noted that, whilst interesting, it had been in a group without a future.

== Specifications ==
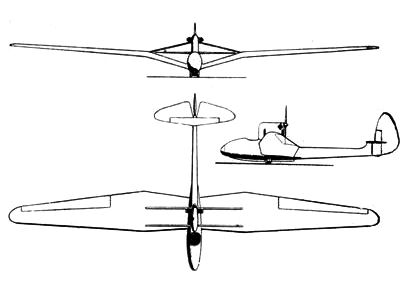
Avia 60-MP 3-view drawing from L'Aerophile-Salon 1934

Data from L'Aérophile Salon 1934

General characteristics

- Crew: One
- Length: 7.30 m (23 ft 11 in)
- Wingspan: 15 m (49 ft 3 in)
- Wing area: 17.8 m^{2} (192 sq ft)
- Aspect ratio: 12.5
- Empty weight: 220 kg (485 lb)
- Gross weight: 300 kg (661 lb)
- Powerplant: 1 × Poinsard flat twin, 19 kW (25 hp) pusher configuration. (Note: The 1933 design studies used 50-MP to describe the advanced aircraft and 60-MP for the basic trainer; the labels were swapped around soon after, though the 1933 Les Ailes article uses both notations, with the old numbering in the text.)
- Propellers: 2-bladed, 1.60 m (5 ft 3 in) diameter

Performance

- Maximum speed: 110 km/h (68 mph, 59 kn) at 15 kW (20 hp)
- Service ceiling: 5,000 m (16,000 ft)
- Landing speed: 35–40 km/h (22–25 mph)
