= Jodel D.9 Bébé =

French single-seat ultralight monoplane

D.9 Bébé
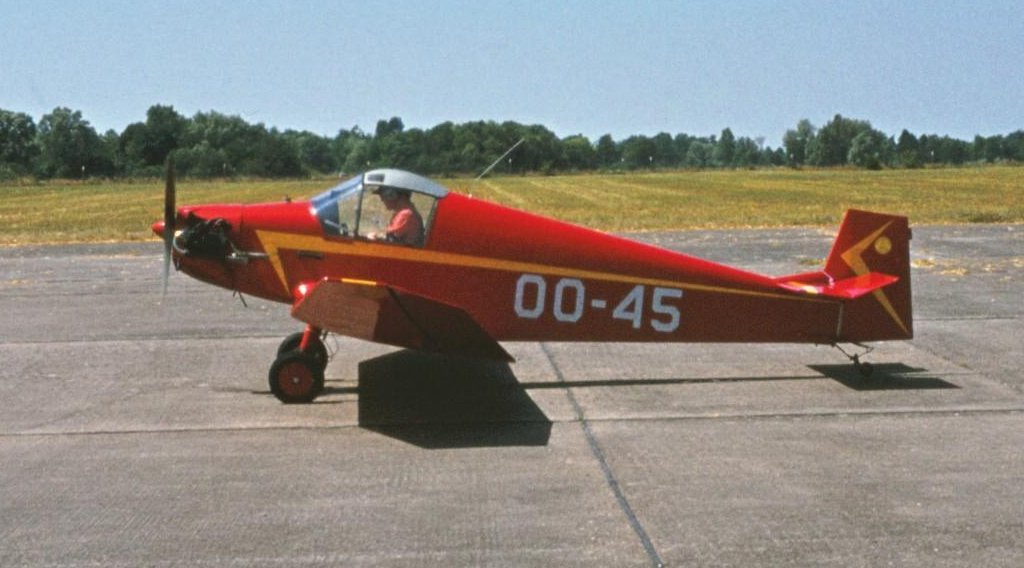

General information
- Type: Ultralight monoplane
- National origin: France
- Manufacturer: Jodel
- Designer: Jean Délémontez
- Number built: 500+

History
- Introduction date: 1948
- First flight: 21 January 1948
- Variant: Falconar F9A

The Jodel D.9 Bébé is a French single-seat ultralight monoplane designed by Jean Délémontez for amateur construction.

== Design and development ==
In March 1946, Edouard Joly and Jean Délémontez formed the Société des Avions Jodel to supply kits, materials and plans to allow homebuilders to construct an ultralight monoplane designed by Délémontez and named the Jodel D.9 Bébé. The D9 was a wooden low-wing cantilever monoplane with a single-seat open cockpit and a fixed tailskid landing gear. The wing had an inner section of parallel chord and no dihedral, joined to outer tapered sections with strong (14°) dihedral. This became a standard feature of many subsequent Jodel models.

The prototype D.9, registered F-WEPF, first flew on 21 January 1948.

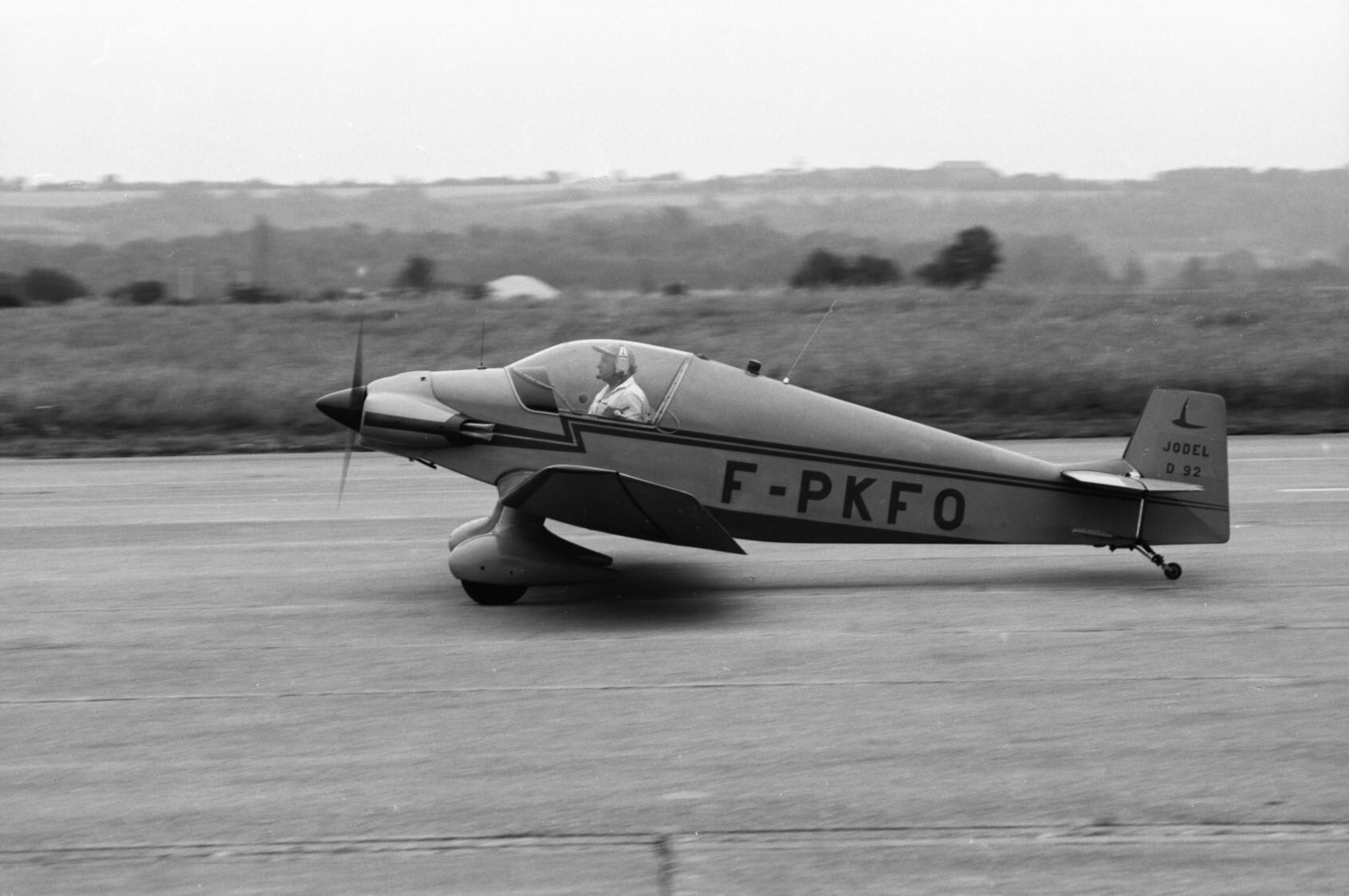
A Jodel D.92

The D.9 was powered by a single 25 h.p. Poinsard flat two-cylinder engine, the D.91 by a 34 h.p. A.B.C. Scorpion flat-two and the D.92 by flat-four Volkswagen engines of either 26 hp (19 kW) or 45 hp (34 kW). The D.93 had a 28 hp (21 kW) Poinsard.

Although designed for amateur construction and built in large numbers, it was also built commercially and the Wassmer company built 12. Plans were also sold by a number of companies including Falconair in Canada. Over 800 plans have been sold and over 500 aircraft have been built by amateurs and flying clubs.

Ben Keillor translated the French kit plans to English in 1959, and constructed and demonstrated a D9 in Canada and America. The design was further developed into the two-seat Jodel D.11.

== Variants ==
D.9 Bébé
Powered by a 19 kW (25 hp) Poinsard.
D.91
Powered by a 26 kW (35 hp) ABC Scorpion.
D.92
Powered by a 26 hp (19 kW) or 45 hp (34 kW) Volkswagen
D.93
Powered by a 21 kW (28 hp) Poinsard.
D.97
Powered by a 24 kW (32 hp) Saroléa Vautour
D.98
Powered by a 25 hp (19 kW) Ava 4A-00

== Jodel D.10 ==
Jean Delmontez scaled up the D.9 to produce plans for a three-seater powered by a 75 to 85 hp (56 to 63 kW) engine, but was persuaded by SALS (the Light Sport Aircraft Service of the French Government) to build the two-seat D.11 to provide training aircraft for French aero clubs using the wing of the D.10.

== Aircraft on display ==
- The prototype F-PEPF was displayed at the Musée de l'Air et de l'Espace, Paris, France, from 1962 to 2006

== Specifications (D.92) ==
Data from Jane's All the World's Aircraft 1956–57

General characteristics

- Crew: 1
- Length: 5.45 m (17 ft 11 in)
- Wingspan: 7.00 m (23 ft 0 in)
- Wing area: 9.0 m^{2} (97 sq ft)
- Empty weight: 162 kg (357 lb)
- Gross weight: 272 kg (600 lb)
- Powerplant: 1 × Volkswagen 4-cylinder air cooled horizontally-opposed piston engine, 19 kW (26 hp)
- Propellers: 2-bladed fixed-pitch propeller

Performance

- Maximum speed: 150 km/h (93 mph, 81 kn)
- Cruise speed: 130 km/h (81 mph, 70 kn)
- Range: 460 km (290 mi, 250 nmi)
- Rate of climb: 2.09 m/s (412 ft/min)

== See also ==
Related development

- Jodel D11
