= Société Aéronautique Normande =

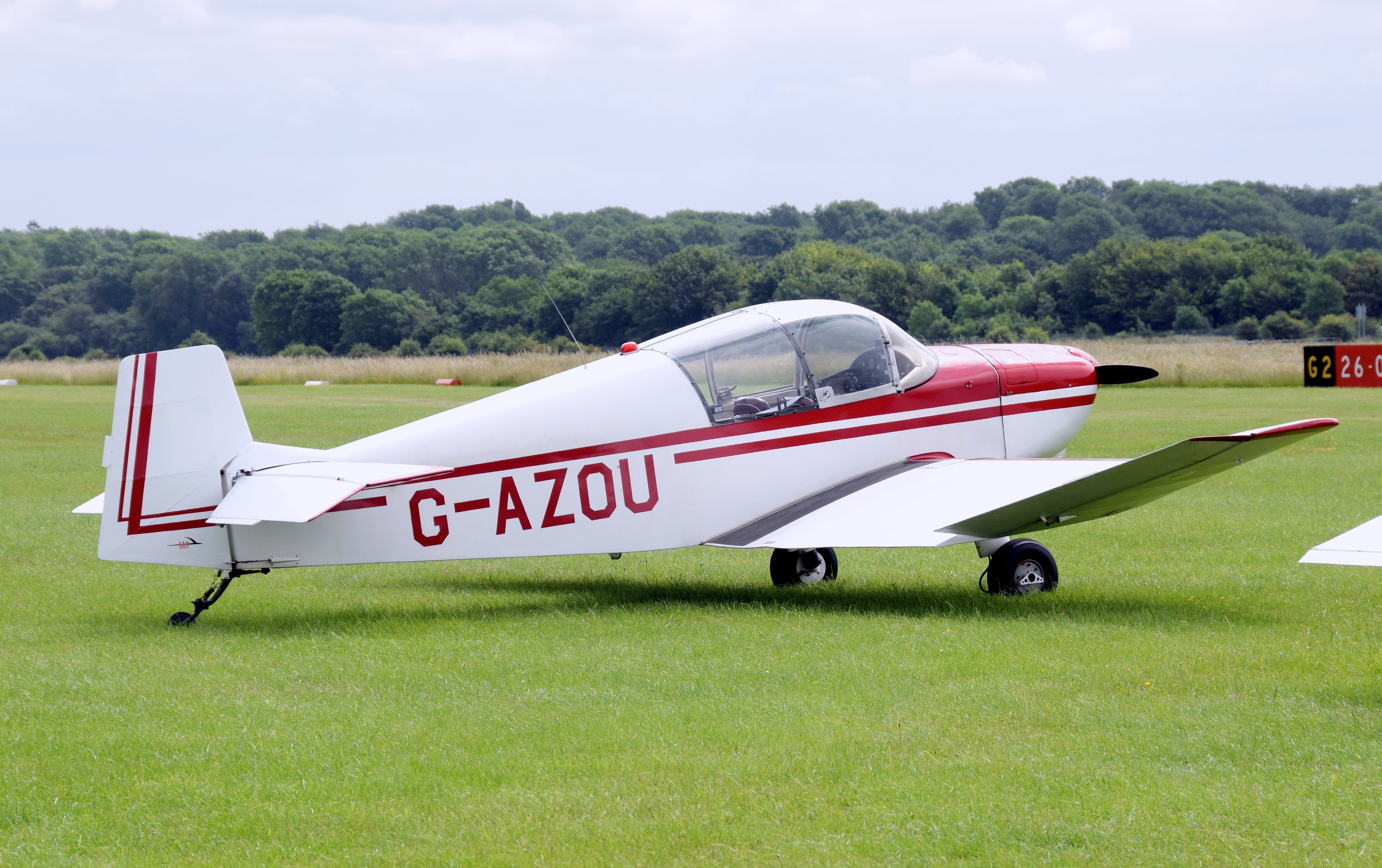
SAN Jodel DR1050 Ambassadeur, built 1962

Société Aéronautique Normande (SAN) was a French aircraft manufacturing business based at Bernay. It was formed in 1948 and failed in 1968.

== History ==
The company was started on 1 May 1948 at Bernay-Saint-Martin by Lucien Querey. Querey was a glider pilot and aeromodeller and his idea was to run an Aviation Service Station similar to a motor-vehicle garage. His first aircraft was a conversion of a Piper Cub followed by his own two-seater design, the SAN-101. The SAN-101 did not enter production and Querey started to build the Jodel D.11 under licence.

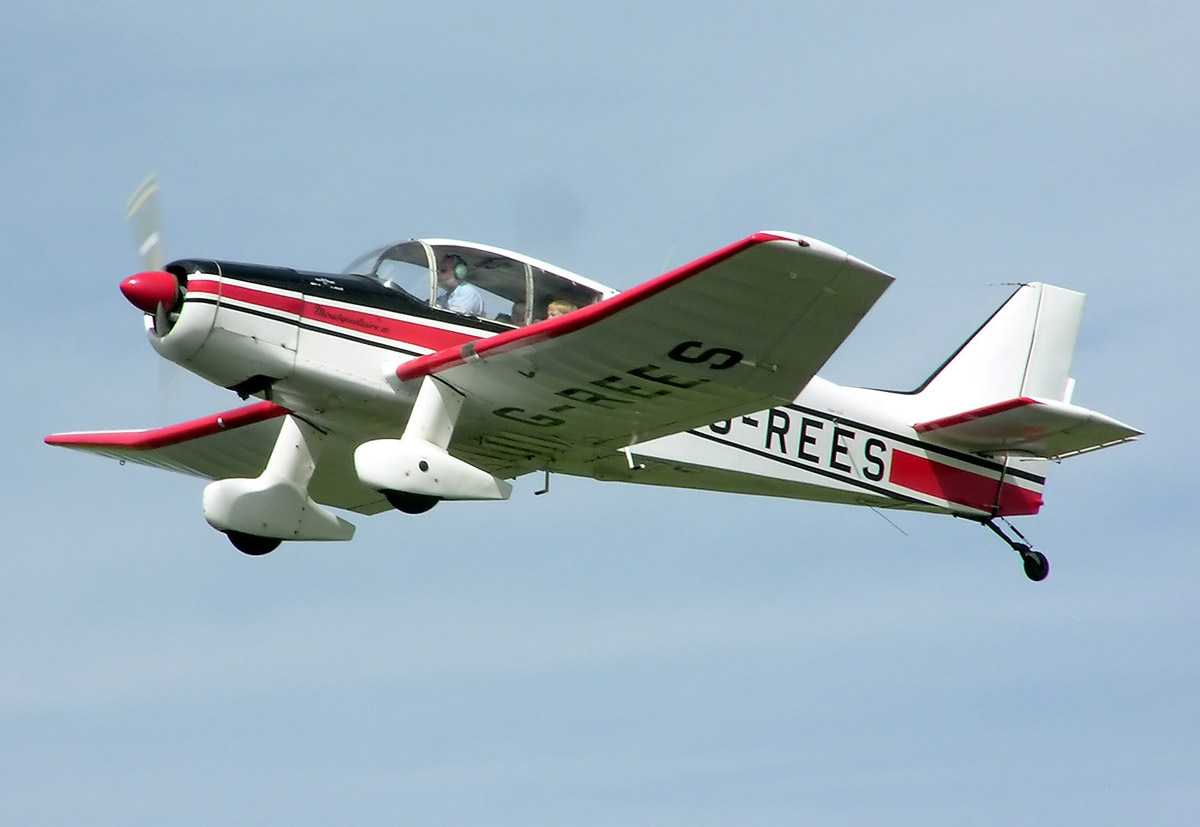
SAN Jodel D.140C Mousquetaire, built 1965

From 1952 the company built other Jodel designs under licence and these were followed by two models exclusive to SAN, the D.140 Mousquetaire four/five seater and the D.150 Mascaret two-seater.

In November 1959 the company suffered a serious fire which was followed by the death of Querey and the company was then run by Querey's wife. By the mid-1960s the company was in financial difficulties and it was forced into receivership in November 1968. The assets were bought by Auguste Mudry who completed the last batch of D.140s and then used the factory to build Piel designs.

== Aircraft designs ==
- SAN-101
- SAN Jodel D.112
- SAN Jodel D.117
- SAN Jodel DR.100A
- SAN Jodel DR.105A
- SAN Jodel DR.1050 Ambassadeur/Excellence
- SAN Jodel D.140 Mousquetaire
- SAN Jodel D.150 Mascaret
