= D18 =

D18 may refer to:

- D-18 guitar
- Brazilian destroyer escort Bracuí (D18), a Cannon-class destroyer escort of the Brazilian Navy
- Darmstadt D-18, a German sportsplane
- Dublin 18, a postal district in Ireland
- HMS Antrim (D18), a County-class destroyer of the Royal Navy
- HMS Battler (D18), an Attacker-class escort carrier of the Royal Navy
- HMS St. Kitts (D18), a Battle-class destroyer of the Royal Navy
- Jodel D18, a French ultralight aircraft
- LNER Class D18, a steam locomotive class
- Progress D-18, a turbofan engine
