= SAN Jodel D.140 Mousquetaire =

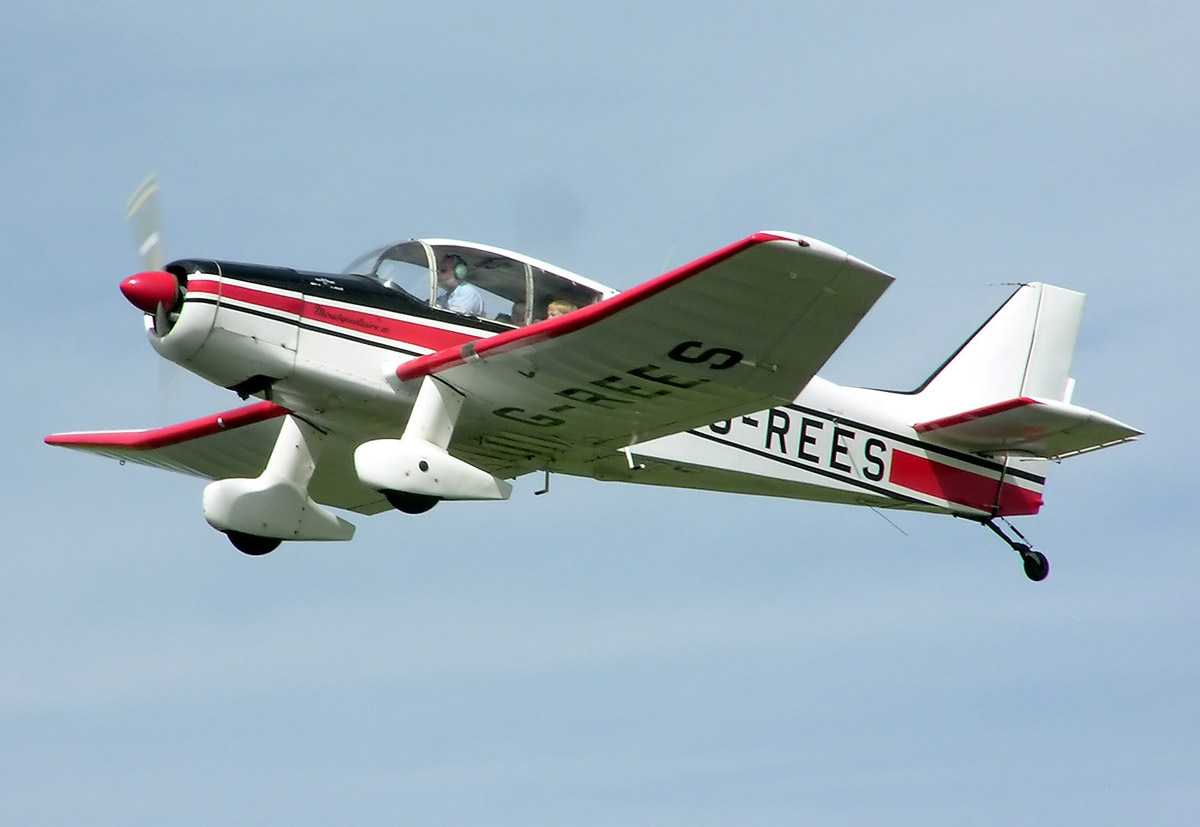
- D.140C

General information
- Type: Five-seat light touring monoplane
- National origin: France
- Manufacturer: Société Aéronautique Normande (SAN)
- Status: Plans available (2012)
- Primary user: French Air Force
- Number built: 243 (factory built)

History
- Introduction date: 1958
- First flight: 4 July 1958

The SAN Jodel D.140 Mousquetaire (Musketeer) is a French five-seat light touring monoplane based on the earlier Jodel D.117 and built by Société Aéronautique Normande (SAN) at Bernay.

== Development ==
SAN had been producing the earlier Jodel D.117 under licence from which it then developed the larger 4 to 5-seat D.140. The prototype D.140 registration F-BIZE first flew on 4 July 1958. Early versions had a low triangular-shaped fin and rudder.

The final version was a glider tug variant the D.140R Abeille. Both the D.140E and D.140R were ordered by the French Air Force. As well as 243 factory-built aircraft more than 20 have been homebuilt from plans. The type was flown by aero clubs and private owners and remains in use in 2014.

Plans remained available in 2015.

== Variants ==
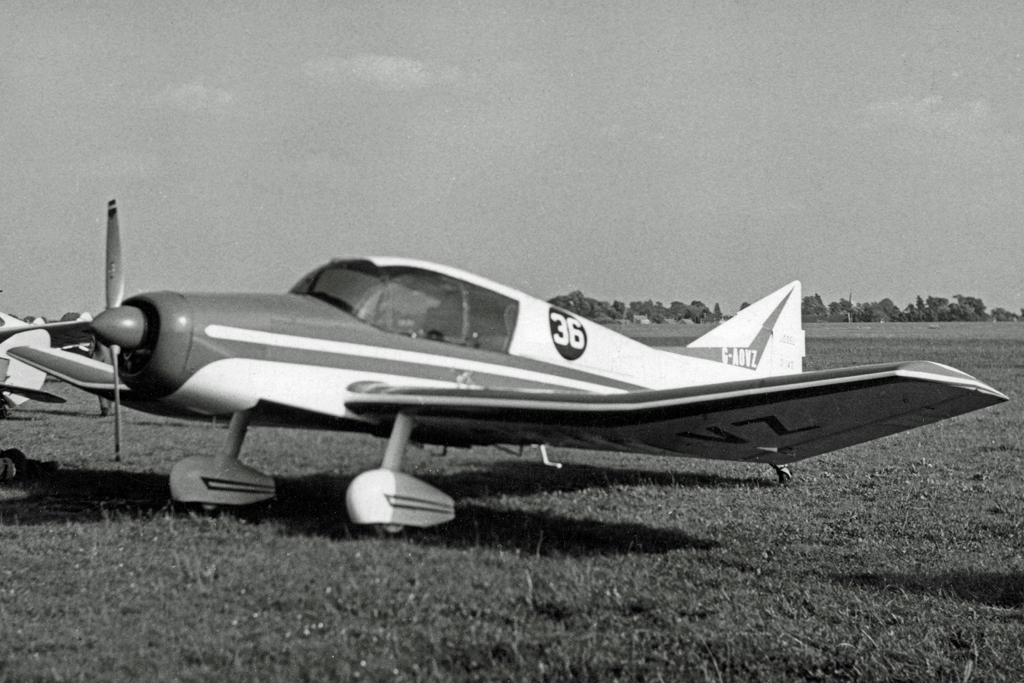
Early Jodel D.140 with the initial lower triangular fin shape at Cranfield aerodrome in 1960

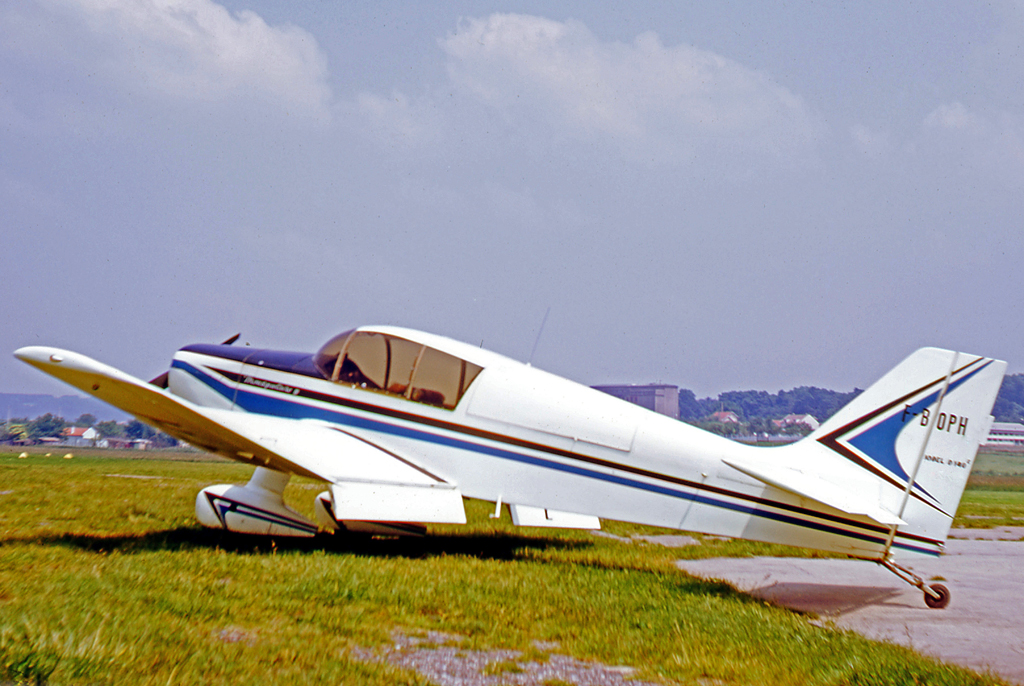
Jodel D.140E showing the enlarged fin at St Cyr l'Ecole airfield near Paris in 1969

D.140 Mousquetaire
Prototype powered by a 180hp Lycoming O-360 engine, one built.
D.140A Mousquetaire
Production variant with cabin ventilation, 45 built.
D.140B Mousquetaire II
Improved variant with better brakes, new engine cowling and better ventilation, 56 built.
D.140C Mousquetaire III
A D.140B with an enlarged swept tail, 70 built.
D.140E Mousquetaire IV
A D.140C with a further enlarged tail, modified ailerons and an all flying elevator/tailplane, 43 built.
D.140R Abeille
Glider towing variant with cut-down rear fuselage, new high vision canopy, 28 built first flown in 1965.

== Operators ==
France

- French Air and Space Force

== Specifications (D.140) ==
Data from Jane's All the World's Aircraft 1962–63

General characteristics

- Crew: 1
- Capacity: 3 passengers
- Length: 7.90 m (25 ft 11 in)
- Wingspan: 10.22 m (33 ft 6 in)
- Height: 2.15 m (7 ft 1 in)
- Wing area: 17.9 m^{2} (193 sq ft)
- Airfoil: NACA 23015
- Empty weight: 660 kg (1,455 lb)
- Max takeoff weight: 1,200 kg (2,646 lb)
- Powerplant: 1 × Lycoming O-360-A1A air-cooled flat-four piston engine, 130 kW (180 hp)

Performance

- Maximum speed: 250 km/h (160 mph, 130 kn)
- Cruise speed: 220 km/h (140 mph, 120 kn) (econ cruise)
- Stall speed: 55 km/h (34 mph, 30 kn)
- Range: 1,200 km (750 mi, 650 nmi)
- Service ceiling: 4,500 m (14,800 ft)
- Rate of climb: 5.00 m/s (985 ft/min)
