= Avia 50-MP =

Single-seat French glider, 1934

General information
- Type: Introductory Motor glider
- National origin: France
- Designer: Raymond Jarlaud
- Number built: 1 or 2

History
- First flight: 17 May 1934
- Developed from: Avia XV-A

The Avia 50-MP was a French motor glider based on that of the Avia XV-A training glider. First flown in 1934, it was intended to introduce pilots to motor-gliders.

== Design and development ==
In 1933 Avia introduced two designs based on their earlier training gliders but fitted with low powered engines, placing them amongst the first motor gliders. The Avia 50-MP (MP for moteur planeur or motor glider) was the more basic of the two and was a development of the Avia XV-A. (Note: The 1933 design studies used 50-MP to describe the advanced aircraft and 60-MP for the basic trainer; the labels were swapped around soon after, though the 1933 Les Ailes article uses both notations, with the old numbering in the text.)

The Avia 50-MP was a monoplane with a two-piece high wing of rectangular plan, with blunted tips and about 4.5° of sweep. Broad chord ailerons filled about half the span. The roots were attached to a streamlined, fuselage mounted pillar, and each wing was braced from about half span to the lower fuselage with a pair of parallel struts. The pillar also mounted the pusher configuration 19 kW (25 hp) Poinsard flat twin engine, its cylinders exposed for air-cooling and driving a 1.6 m (5 ft 3 in) two bladed propeller just behind the wing trailing edge.

The pilot's single, open cockpit was immediately in front of the wing-mounting pillar in an oval section forward fuselage similar to those of the motorless gliders. The position of the propeller disc just behind the wing required the rear fuselage to be rather shallow, so it was formed by four longerons with plywood covering, resulting in a rectangular section. The empennage was conventional, with a triangular tailplane sitting on a low, raised step with a curved leading edge and carrying straight tapered, square tipped, unbalanced elevators. The rear of the step mounted the rudder hinge bearing a tall, straight tapered and flat topped balanced rudder. The rudder extended to a rounded heel at the keel via cut-aways in the inner edges of the elevators.

The Avia 50-MP landed on an under-fuselage skid fitted with two retractable wheels to facilitate ground handling. The earliest design had always included the possibility of an alternative wheeled undercarriage and by June 1934, just a month after the first tests, it had been fitted. Each of the normal size wheels were mounted on a V-strut from mid-fuselage, with an axle to the central fuselage underside. The tail was protected by a small bumper.

The first flight was piloted by Eric Nessler and took place on 17 May 1934. There are references to its activities in the French glider scene at least until 1938, when it was being used by the L'Air group.

== Specifications ==
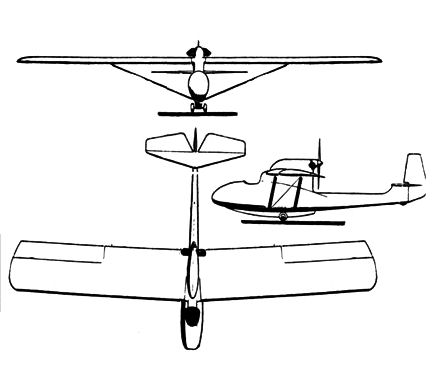
Avia 50-MP 3-view drawing from L'Aerophile-Salon 1934

Data from L'Aérophile 1934

General characteristics

- Crew: One
- Length: 6.50 m (21 ft 4 in)
- Wingspan: 11.10 m (36 ft 5 in)
- Wing area: 15.2 m^{2} (164 sq ft)
- Aspect ratio: 8
- Empty weight: 185 kg (408 lb)
- Gross weight: 265 kg (584 lb)
- Powerplant: 1 × Poinsard 25hp 2-cyl air-cooled flat twin, 15 kW (20 hp)
- Propellers: 2-bladed, 1.60 m (5 ft 3 in) diameter

Performance

- Maximum speed: 100 km/h (62 mph, 54 kn)
- Landing speed: 40 km/h (25 mph)
