= Potez 4E =

1960s French piston aircraft engine

- Type: Air-cooled flat-four engine
- National origin: France
- Manufacturer: Potez
- Major applications: SAN Jodel D.150 Mascaret
- Manufactured: 1960–1965

The Potez 4E is a French air-cooled flat-four piston engine of the 1960s. It was unveiled at the 1959 Paris Air Show, entered production in 1960 and is rated at 78 kW (105 hp). It remained in production until 1965 when Potez abandoned production of aero-engines.

== Variants ==
4E-00
67.1 kW (90 hp)
4E-02
4E-20
78.3 kW (105 hp)
4E-30
Fuel injected. 86.5 kW (116 hp)

== Applications ==
- Chasle Tourbillon
- Dabos JD.24P D'Artagnan
- Godbille JG.1B
- Merville D.63
- Piel Emeraude
- Pottier P.60 Minacro
- Jodel DR1050 Excellence
- SAN Jodel D.150 Mascaret
- Starck AS-27 Starcky

== Specifications (Potez 4E-20) ==
Data from

=== General characteristics ===
- Type: direct drive right-hand tractor air-cooled flat-four piston engine
- Bore: 110 mm (4.33 in)
- Stroke: 90 mm (3.54 in)
- Displacement: 3.42 L (208.70 cu in)
- Length: 782 mm (30.8 in)
- Width: 778 mm (30.6 in)
- Height: 605 mm (23.8 in)
- Dry weight: 92 kg (203 lb) dry un-equipped, 103 kg (227 lb) equipped

=== Components ===
- Valvetrain: Two valves per cylinder with dual springs operated by rockers and pushrods from a gear driven camshaft.
- Fuel system: One NAS 42 Zenith carburettor
- Fuel type: 100/130 octane
- Oil system: Pressure feed to bearings and moving parts at 300–480 kPa (43–70 psi), oil grade SAE 50 and 40
- Cooling system: Air-cooled
- Reduction gear: Direct drive
- 12 Volt Ducellier electric starter motor, 12 Volt 250 Watt belt driven generator

=== Performance ===
- Power output: 78 kW (105 hp) at 2,750 rpm for take-off, 61 kW (82 hp) at 2,600 rpm at 910 m (3,000 ft) cruising
- Specific fuel consumption: 0.298 kg/kW/hr (0.49 lb/hp/hr) at normal cruising power
- Oil consumption: 0.18 kg (0.40 lb)/hour
- Power-to-weight ratio: 1.68 kW/kg (1.02 hp/lb)
