= Dabos JD.24P D'Artagnan =

JD.24P D'Artagnan
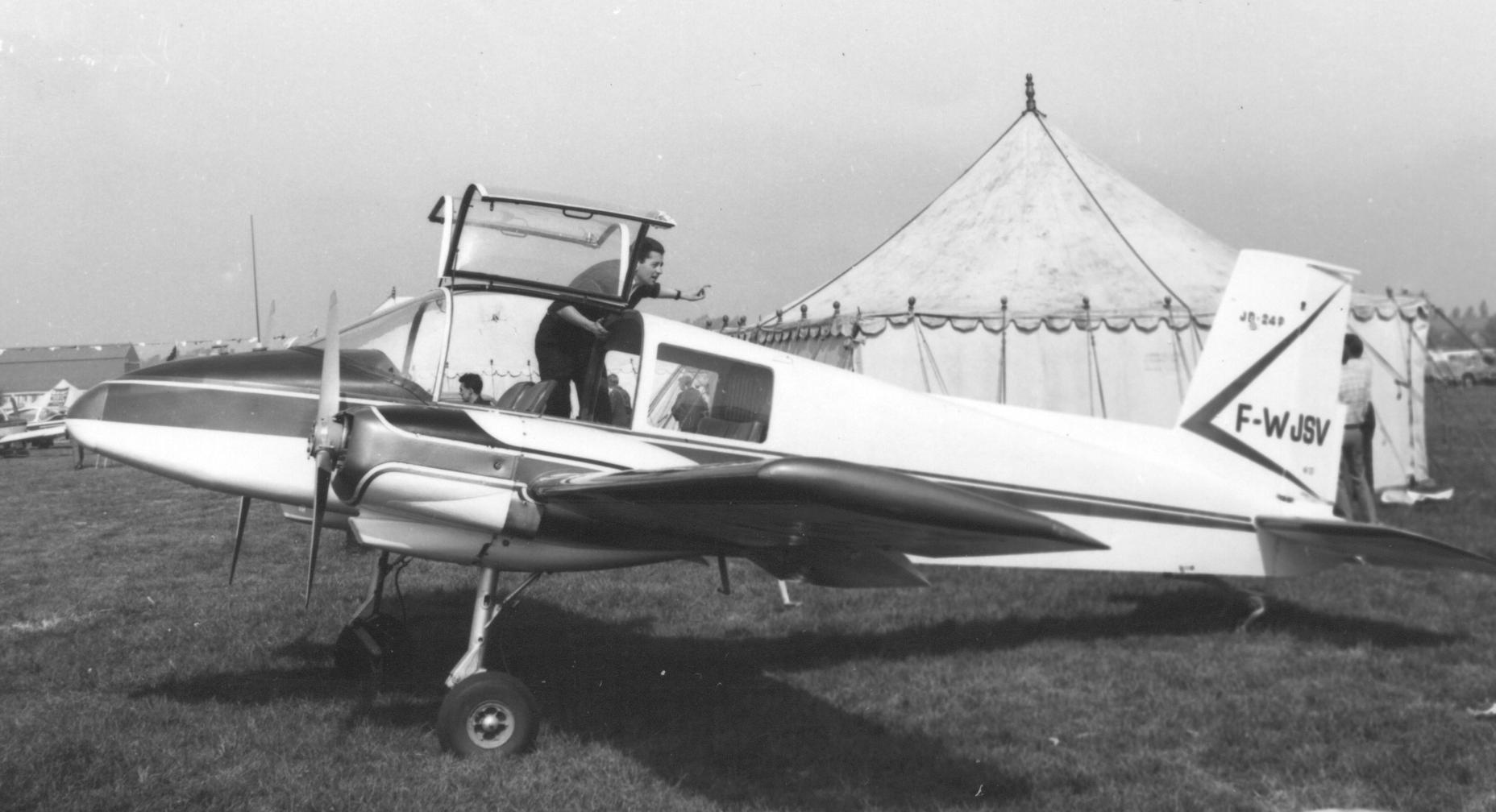
- The sole JD.24P D'Artagnan displayed at Biggin Hill, Kent, in May 1967

General information
- Type: light twin-engined civil aircraft
- National origin: France
- Manufacturer: Andre Courtade
- Designer: Jean Dabos
- Primary user: the aircraft's designer
- Number built: 1

History
- Introduction date: 1963
- First flight: 10 March 1963

The Dabos JD.24P D'Artagnan was a French light twin-engined civil utility aircraft of the 1960s.

== Development ==
The aircraft was designed by Jean Dabos in 1962 and first flew in the following year. The D'Artagnan featured a two-spar plywood-covered wooden wing and an all-wood semi-monocoque fuselage. A retractable tailwheel undercarriage was fitted, but provision was made for changing to a tricycle undercarriage layout. Accommodation was provided for four persons. The projected production version was to have a non-retractable faired undercarriage, variable-pitch propellers in place of the prototype's fixed pitch units, and 115 h.p. Potez engines.

== Operational history ==
The sole example F-WJSV was flown extensively by its designer, Jean Dabos, for much of the 1960s. In May 1967 the D'Artagnan was flown to Biggin Hill Airport in Kent for demonstrations. It was later registered F-PJSV in the homebuilt series and in 2006 was held in storage at the Musee Regional de l'Air at Angers Aerodrome.

== Specifications ==
Data from Green, 1965, p. 40

General characteristics

- Crew: one
- Capacity: three passengers
- Length: 23 ft 3 in (7.09 m)
- Wingspan: 33 ft 1 in (10.08 m)
- Height: 7 ft 3 in (2.21 m)
- Empty weight: 1,540 lb (699 kg)
- Gross weight: 2,530 lb (1,066 kg)
- Powerplant: 2 × Potez 4E four-cylinder air-cooled , 105 hp (78 kW) each

Performance

- Maximum speed: 150 mph (241 km/h, 130 kn)
- Cruise speed: 137 mph (220 km/h, 119 kn)
- Range: 620 mi (1,000 km, 540 nmi)
