= Botali P.A.M.A. =

P.A.M.A.
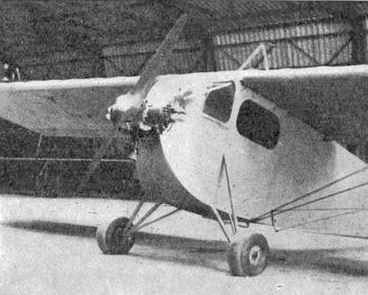

General information
- Type: Motor glider
- National origin: France
- Manufacturer: Botali and du Rivau
- Designer: Botali
- Number built: 1

History
- First flight: 22 May 1934

The Botali P.A.M.A or Botali-du Rivau P.A.M.A. Type 1 was a very low power French single seat aircraft built in 1934 to a target price of 20,000 Francs.

== Design and development ==
In order to meet a target price of 20,000 Francs set by the Air Ministry a decade before, Botali designed a 1930s version of the very low power light aircraft that competed in the Lympne light aircraft trials of the 1920s. Unlike the earlier aircraft, his design had an enclosed cabin and robust landing gear. His P.A.M.A. designation stood for planeur à moteur auxiliary, or motor glider.

Built in collaboration with du Rivau, the Botali P.A.M.A was a high wing, braced monoplane. In plan its two-piece wing was rectangular apart from rounded tips. It was built around two spruce and plywood box spars 800 mm (31 in) apart and ply covered. The wings were wire braced on each side, with a pair of stout flying wires from the lower fuselage to the spars and thinner landing wires from a triangular steel tube cabane on the upper fuselage. Long ailerons, with a chord of only 300 mm (12 in) occupied the entire trailing edge.

The fabric covered fuselage of the Botali was flat-sided, with four spruce longerons connected by spruce diagonal members. At the front two vertical frames defined the cabin and carried the engine bearings, braced by a rhomboidal frame to the wing leading edge. Its horizontal cylinder-shaped nose had the 15 kW (20 hp) air-cooled Poinsard flat twin attached to it externally. Immediately behind the engine, where the upper half of the fuselage was entirely glazed, was the 600 mm (24 in) wide cabin, with two more windows aft. Access was via a starboard side door. Behind the cabin the fuselage tapered, markedly in plan, to the tail. This was conventional, with a triangular fin and rectangular rudder that reached to the keel. The tailplane and separate elevators were also rectangular in plan apart from a deep cut-out in the latter for rudder movement.

The Botali's landing gear was simple: on each side a wheel was mounted on the apex of three steel tubes, two from the lower longeron and a third to the nose framework about halfway up the fuselage. Dunlop balloon tyres provided shock absorbing deflections of more than 100 mm (3.9 in). there was a long steel spring tailskid.

It was flown for the first time on 22 May 1934 by Pierre Pharabod at Toussus-Paris, who reported good handling. In December 1934 the P.A.M.A. Type 1 was successfully demonstrated at Orly by Cressaty, flying along with several other French light aircraft in very wet and windy weather; a Mignet Pou-de-Ciel took the honours. It was displayed at the 14th Paris Aero-Salon in the same month.

== Specifications ==
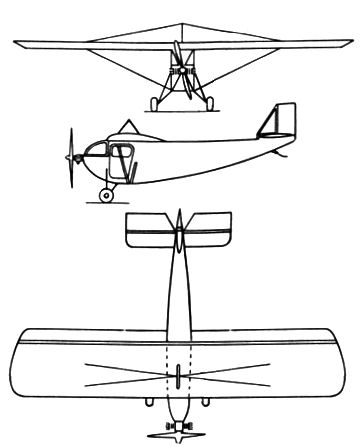
Botali P.A.M.A. 3-view drawing from L'Aerophile-Salon 1934

Data from Les Ailes June 1934

General characteristics

- Crew: One
- Length: 5.95 m (19 ft 6 in)
- Wingspan: 9.0 m (29 ft 6 in)
- Height: 1.90 m (6 ft 3 in)
- Wing area: 16.2 m^{2} (174 sq ft)
- Aspect ratio: 5
- Empty weight: 188 kg (414 lb)
- Gross weight: 300 kg (661 lb)
- Fuel capacity: 20 L (4.4 imp gal; 5.3 US gal) standard; up to 45 L (9.9 imp gal; 12 US gal) supplementary tank
- Powerplant: 1 × Poinsard 25hp 2-cyl air-cooled flat twin, 15 kW (20 hp) at 2,000 rpm
- Propellers: 2-bladed, 1.65 m (5 ft 5 in) diameter

Performance

- Maximum speed: 110–120 km/h (68–75 mph, 59–65 kn)
- Cruise speed: 80–90 km/h (50–56 mph, 43–49 kn) at 70% power
- Stall speed: 50 km/h (31 mph, 27 kn)
- Range: 300 km (190 mi, 160 nmi) with standard tank; 1,000 km (620 mi) with additional 45 L (9.9 imp gal; 12 US gal)
- Service ceiling: 5,000 m (16,000 ft) theoretical
- Time to altitude: 4 min to 300 m (980 ft)
- Take-off distance: 65 m (213 ft)
- Landing distance (without braking): 20 m (66 ft)
- Landing speed: 35 km/h (22 mph; 19 kn)
