= Godbille JG.1B =

General information
- Type: Two seat sport homebuilt aircraft
- National origin: France
- Designer: Jean Godbille
- Number built: 1

History
- First flight: 1989

The Godbille JG.1B is a French light, two seat amateur built aircraft, dating from 1989. Only one was constructed.

== Design and development ==
The JG.1B is a small sports aircraft with two seats placed side-by side. It has a polyester fabric covered steel tube structure and is a cantilever, low wing monoplane. Its straight edged wings carry inboard flaps.

Conventionally laid out, the JG.1B is powered by a 78 kW (105 hp) Potez 4E-20B1 air-cooled flat four engine which drives a two blade propeller. The two occupants sit over the wing leading edge under a PET canopy, which blends at the rear into a raised, rounded fuselage decking. As the decking drops away rearwards, a long dorsal fillet leads to a swept, straight edged fin with a narrow triangular rudder. The tailplane is wire braced to the fin. The JG.1B's tail wheel undercarriage is fixed.

The JG.1B gained its Certificate of Airworthiness on 15 November 1989. It remains on the French Civil Aircraft register in 2014.

== Specifications ==
Data from Gaillard (1991), p.246

General characteristics

- Capacity: Two
- Length: 6.10 m (20 ft 0 in)
- Wingspan: 6.20 m (20 ft 4 in)
- Wing area: 9.4 m^{2} (101 sq ft)
- Empty weight: 418 kg (922 lb)
- Gross weight: 662 kg (1,459 lb)
- Powerplant: 1 × Potez 4E-20B1 air-cooled flat four, 78 kW (105 hp)
- Propellers: 2-bladed

Performance

- Cruise speed: 185 km/h (115 mph, 100 kn)
- Endurance: 4 hr
