= Pottier P.60 Minacro =

P.60 Minacro
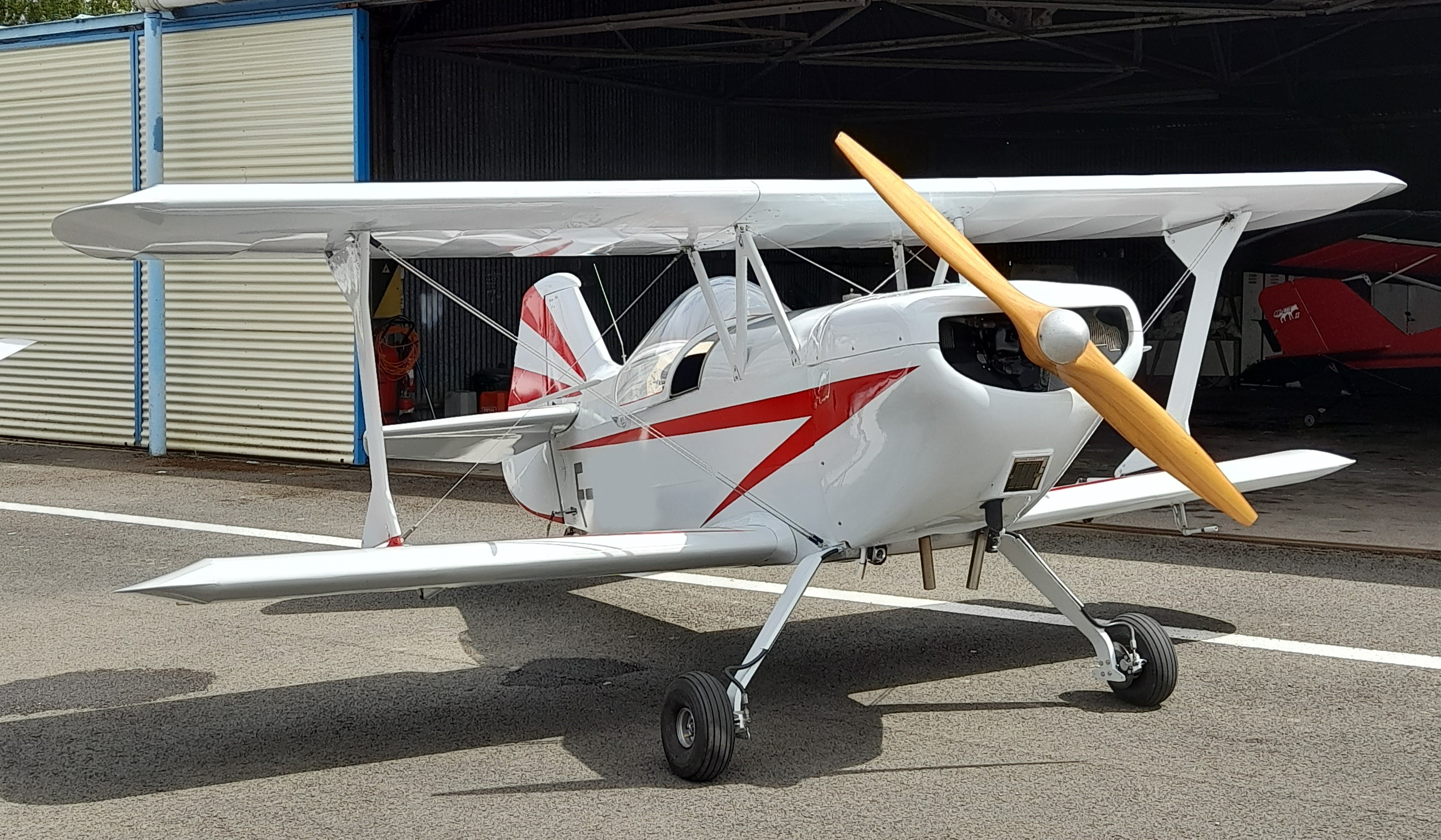
- Pottier P60 Minacro

General information
- Type: Homebuilt aerobatic single seat biplane
- National origin: France
- Designer: Jean Pottier
- Number built: between 5 and 7

History
- First flight: 1991 or 1992

The Pottier P.60 Minacro is a homebuilt French single seat biplane designed for aerobatics. It first flew in the early 1990s; about six have been completed.

== Design and development ==
The Minacro is the only biplane amongst Jean Pottier's many light aircraft designs. Like them, it was intended to be home built from his plans. It is a compact wood and fabric single bay aerobatic biplane, with noticeable stagger. There is a single, wide chord interplane strut on each side, assisted by flying wires and a pair of N-form cabane struts between the upper wing centre-section and the fuselage.

Behind the engine the fuselage is flat-sided, though with rounded decking. The windscreen of the open cockpit is immediately under the upper wing trailing edge. Both the fin and balanced rudder are broad chord and the latter extends down to the keel so that the elevators, mounted near the top of the fuselage require a cut-out to allow their operation. The Minacro has a fixed, tailwheel undercarriage with its main wheels, often spatted, on cantilever legs from the lower fuselage just behind the engine.

The first Minacro was built in Austria, making its first flight in about 1991 or 1992 powered by a 78 kW (105 hp) Potez 4E-20A engine. Later French-built examples have 65 hp (48 kW) Continental A65, 67 kW (90 hp) Continental C90 or 75 kW (100 hp) Continental O-200-A engines. All of these are air-cooled flat-fours. In 2014 the Austrian Minacro was no longer registered but there were six on the French register, of which at least four, possibly all six, have been completed.

== Variants ==
P.60
Potez 4E-20A engine
P.60A
Continental C90 engine

== Specifications (P.60A) ==
Data from Gaillard (1991) p.256

General characteristics

- Crew: One
- Length: 4.60 m (15 ft 1 in)
- Upper wingspan: 5.0 m (16 ft 5 in)
- Height: 1.75 m (5 ft 9 in)
- Wing area: 8.50 m^{2} (91.5 sq ft)
- Empty weight: 280 kg (617 lb)
- Max takeoff weight: 425 kg (937 lb)
- Powerplant: 1 × Continental C90 air-cooled flat-four, 67 kW (90 hp)
- Propellers: 2-bladed

Performance

- Maximum speed: 210 km/h (130 mph, 110 kn)
- Cruise speed: 190 km/h (120 mph, 100 kn)
- Range: 570 km (350 mi, 310 nmi)
- Rate of climb: 6 m/s (1,200 ft/min)
