= Jodel D.11 =

French two-seat monoplane

D.11
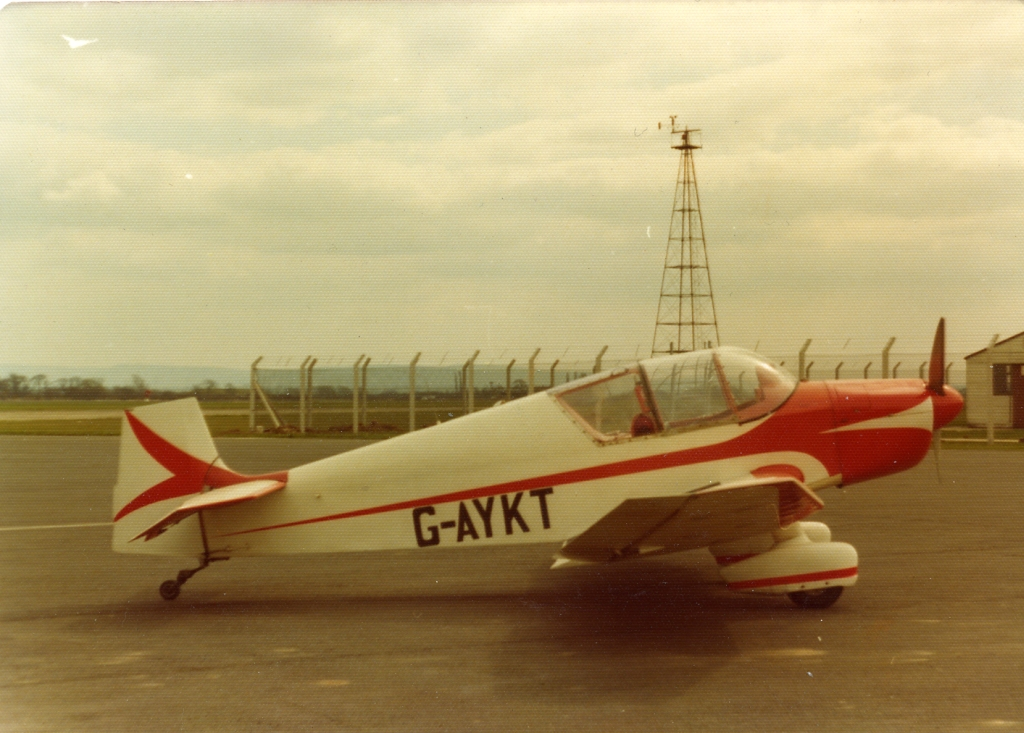
- SAN Jodel D.117

General information
- Type: Trainer/tourer
- Manufacturer: Jodel and others
- Designer: Jean Délémontez
- Number built: more than 3,000

History
- First flight: 4 April 1950
- Developed from: Jodel D9
- Variant: Falconar F11 Sporty

The Jodel D.11 is a French two-seat monoplane designed and developed by Société Avions Jodel in response to a French government request for a low-wing aircraft for use by the nation's many emerging flying clubs.

More than 3,000 examples have been built and flown.

== History ==
Designers Édouard Joly and Jean Délémontez based the design on two of their earlier projects; they combined the wing of the projected D.10 with a lengthened and widened version of the D.9 fuselage. The first example flew on 4 April 1950. Of conventional tailwheel configuration, the D11 featured a fixed, spatted undercarriage, and accommodated pilot and passenger side-by-side. The wing panels outboard of the landing gear struts had a marked dihedral. Various powerplants were installed, typically Salmson 9, Continental O-170 or Continental O-200. The aircraft uses all-wood construction with a single piece box-spar.

D.11s were licence-built by a number of manufacturers in Europe and elsewhere, including Wassmer, Aero-Difusión, and Falconar Avia. Many examples were also home-built with plans provided by Falconar.

== Variants ==
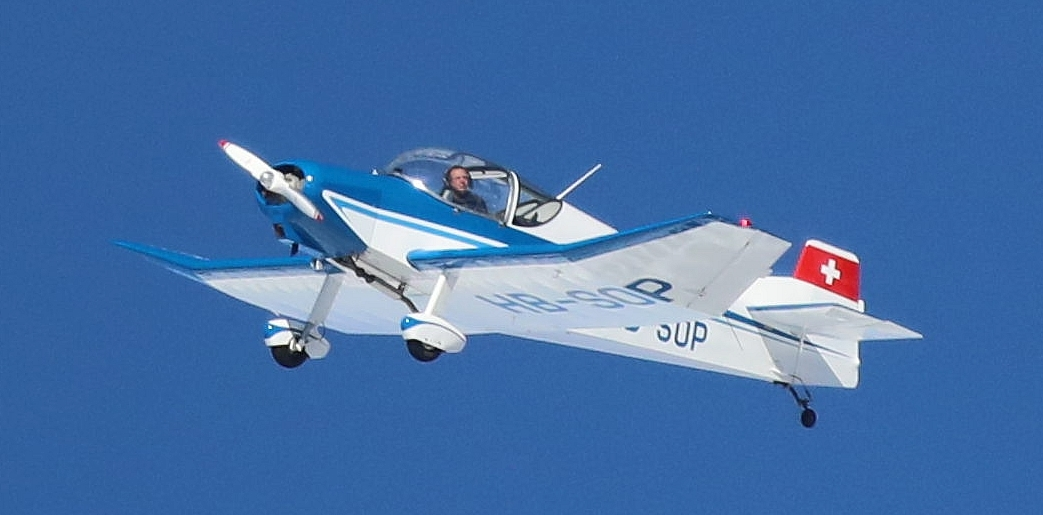
Original 1958 Uetz Jodel D-11 C/N 931–13 in midair.

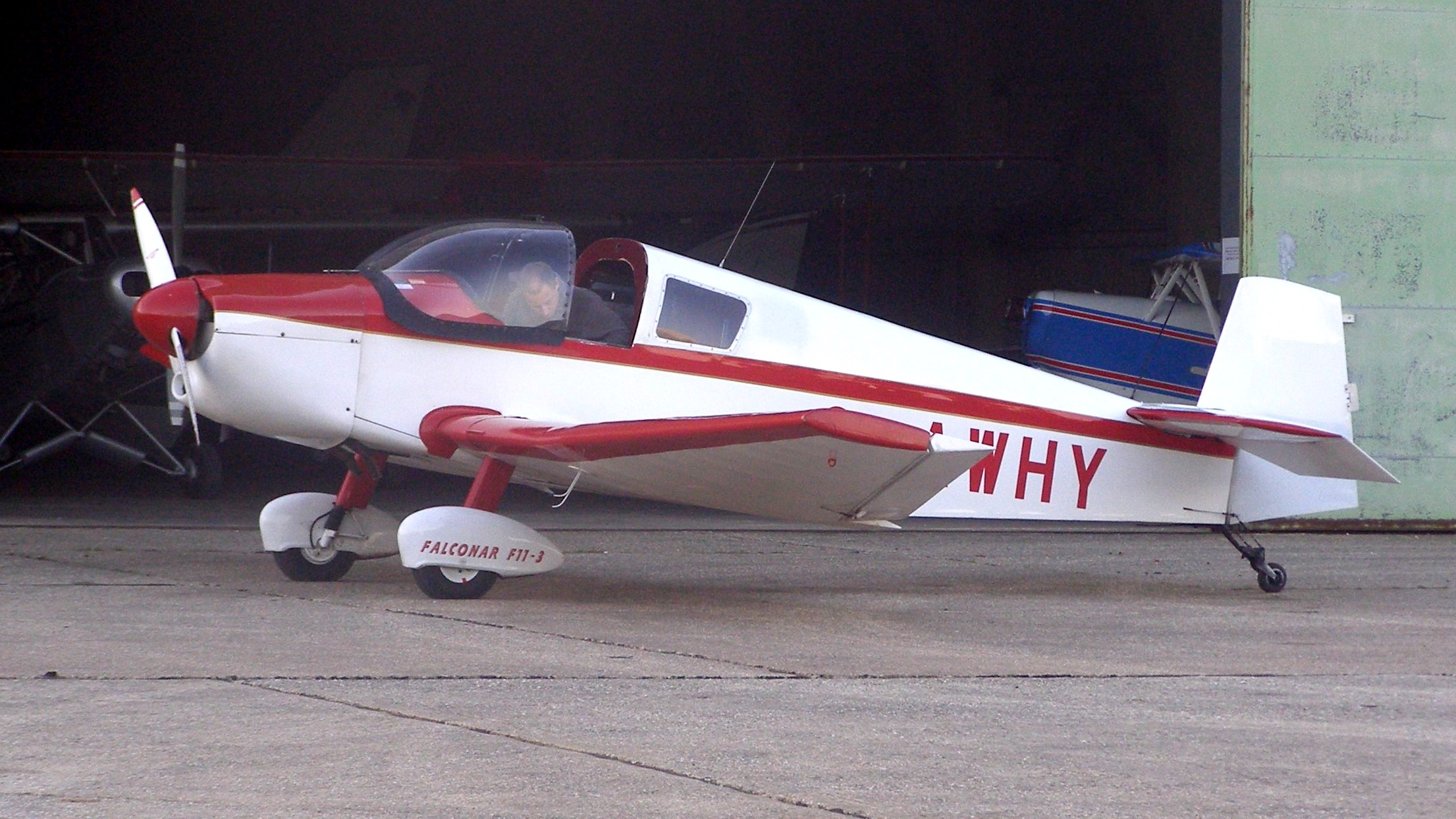
A homebuilt Falconar F11-3 using plans from Falconar of Canada which were based on the Jodel D.11

D.11
original version with a 55 hp Salmson 9Adb engine.
D.111
D.11 with a 75 hp (56 kW) Minié 4.DC.32 engine, built by Jodel.
D.112
D.11 with a 65 hp (48 kW) Continental A65 engine, built by Jodel, Wassmer (Société Wassmer), SAN (Société Aéronautique Normande), Valledeau, Denize and amateur constructors. Amateur-built versions can be powered by engines from 65 to 120 hp (48 to 89 kW). The 90 hp (67 kW) Continental C90 has been used.

D.112A
D.112D
D.112V

D.113
D.11 with a 100 hp (75 kW) Continental O-200-A engine, amateur-built.
D.114
D.11 with a 70 hp (52 kW) Minié 4.DA.28 engine, amateur-built.
D.115
D.11 with a 75 hp (56 kW) Mathis 4G-F-60 engine, amateur-built.
D.116
D.11 with a 60 hp (45 kW) Salmson 9ADr engine, amateur-built.
D.117
SAN built D.11, named Grande Tourisme, 223 built, powerplant 90 hp (67 kW) Continental C90 engine and revised electrics

D.117A - Alpavia built D.117

D118
D11 with a 60 hp (45 kW) Walter Mikron II engine, amateur-built.
D119
amateur-built D.117

D.119D

D.119DA

D.119V

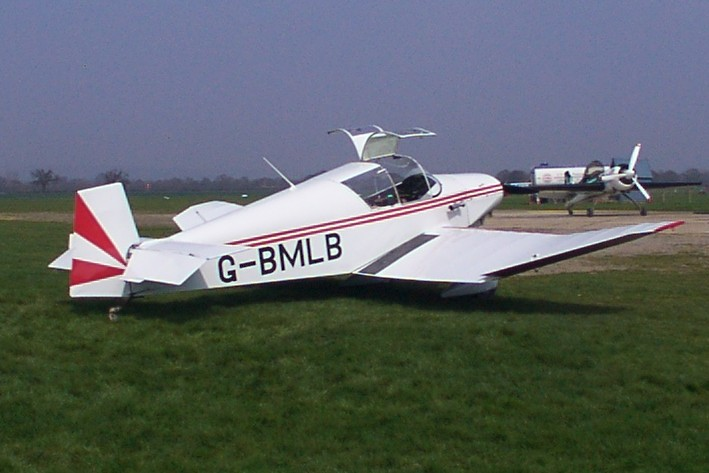
Wassmer Jodel D.120A Paris-Nice

D.120
Wassmer built D.117 named the Paris-Nice, 337 built, powerplant Continental C90.

D.120A - (with airbrakes)
D.120R - ((Remorqueur) Glider Tug)
D.120AR - (Glider Tug with airbrakes)

D.121
D.11 with a 75 hp (56 kW) Continental A75 engine, amateur-built.
D.122
D.11 with a 75 hp (56 kW) Praga engine, amateur-built.
D.123
D.11 with an 85 hp (63 kW) Salmson 5Ap.01 engine, amateur-built.
D.124
D.11 with an 80 hp (60 kW) Salmson 5Aq.01 engine, amateur-built.
D.125
D.11 with a 90 hp (67 kW) Kaiser engine, amateur-built.
D.126
D.11 with an 85 hp (63 kW) Continental C85 engine, amateur-built.
EAC D.127
D.112 with a sliding canopy and DR.100 undercarriage; (EAC - Société d'Etudes Aéronautiques et Commerciales).
EAC D.128
D.119 with a sliding canopy and DR.100 undercarriage; (EAC - Société d'Etudes Aéronautiques et Commerciales).
D.11 Spécial
Falconar F11
Canadian homebuilt derivative design
Uetz U2-MFGZ
Uetz U2V
Straight winged D119 built in Switzerland by Walter Uetz Flugzeugbau
Aero Difusión D-11 Compostela
Aero Difusión D-112 Popuplane
license-built D.112 by Aero-Difusión of Spain.
Aero Difusión D-119 Popuplane
license-built D.119 by Aero-Difusión.
Aero Difusión D-1190S Compostela
68 built
Blenet RB.01 Jozé
Derivatives of the D.112 designed by Roger Blenet Powered by Continental A65-8F engines, two known

== Specifications (D.117 with Continental C90-14F engine) ==
Data from Jane's All the World's Aircraft 1958-59

General characteristics

- Crew: 1
- Capacity: 1 passenger or student pilot
- Length: 6.5 m (21 ft 4 in)
- Wingspan: 8.22 m (27 ft 0 in)
- Height: 2.07 m (6 ft 9 in)
- Wing area: 12.7 m^{2} (137 sq ft)
- Airfoil: NACA 23013.5
- Empty weight: 345 kg (761 lb)
- Gross weight: 600 kg (1,323 lb)
- Fuel capacity: 116 L (30.6 US gal; 25.5 imp gal) in two tanks
- Powerplant: 1 × Continental C90-14F 4-cyl. air-cooled horizontally opposed piston engine, 71 kW (95 hp)
- Propellers: 2-bladed Merville or Légère fixed-pitch propeller with spinner

Performance

- Maximum speed: 207 km/h (129 mph, 112 kn)
- Cruise speed: 195 km/h (121 mph, 105 kn)
- Stall speed: 50 km/h (31 mph, 27 kn)
- Range: 1,170 km (730 mi, 630 nmi) in still air at 1,500 m (4,900 ft) with 30 minutes reserve
- Service ceiling: 5,000 m (16,000 ft)
- Rate of climb: 4 m/s (790 ft/min)
- Take-off run: 120 m (390 ft)
- Landing run: 130 m (430 ft)

== See also ==
Aircraft of comparable role, configuration, and era

- Druine Condor
