= Aero-Difusión =

Spanish aircraft manufacturer

Aero-Difusión SL is a Spanish aircraft manufacturer. It was founded at Santander in 1955, licence-building Jodel and Druine light aircraft.

== Aircraft produced by Aero-Difusión, S.L. ==
Aero-Difusión D11 Compostela
(1950) Single-engine two-seat low-wing monoplane with fixed tailwheel undercarriage. Licence-built version of French Jodel D11
Aero-Difusión D-112 Popuplane
Licence-built version of Jodel D11
Aero-Difusión D-119 Popuplane
Licence-built version of Jodel D11
Aero-Difusión D-1190S Compostela
Licence-built version of Jodel D11
