= Jodel D18 =

French ultralight aeroplane

D18 & D19
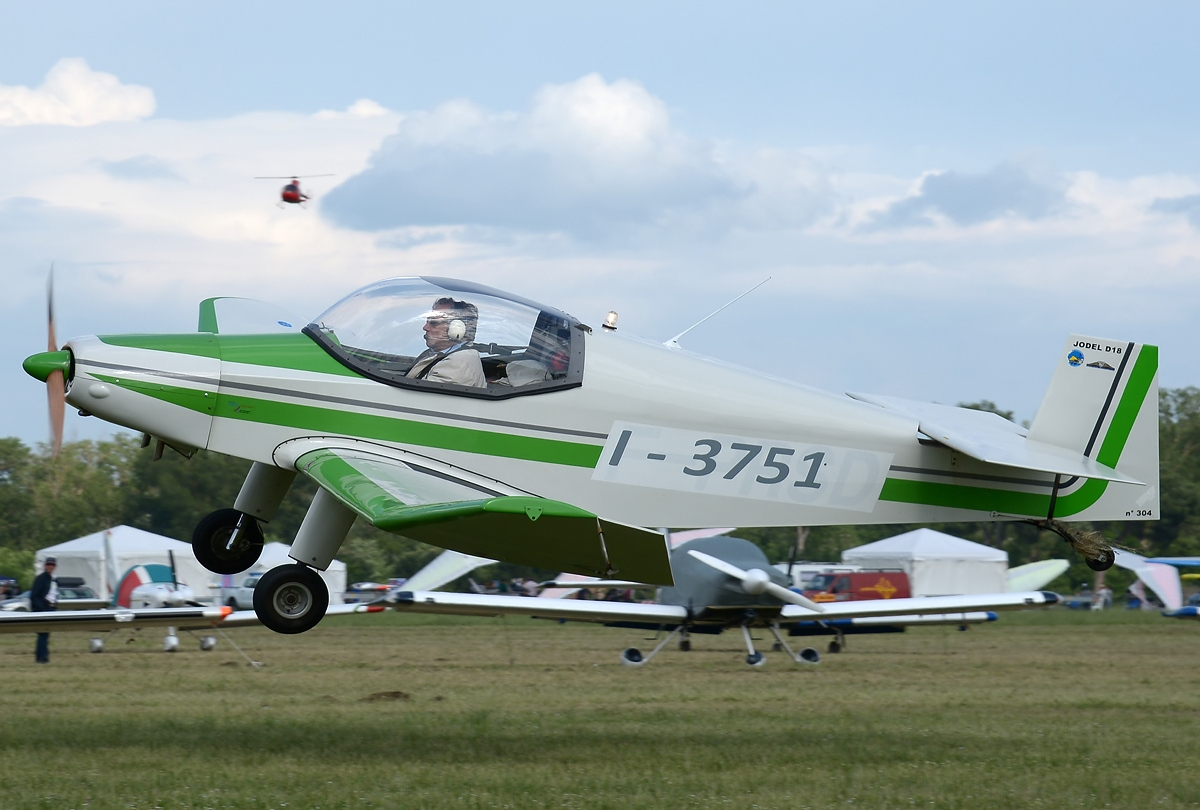
- Jodel D18

General information
- Type: Ultralight aircraft
- National origin: France
- Manufacturer: Jodel
- Status: In production

The Jodel D18 is a French ultralight aircraft, designed and produced by Jodel.

== Design and development ==
The original amateur-built category D18 was adapted to comply with the Fédération Aéronautique Internationale microlight rules with the addition of larger flaps and renamed the D185. Both the D18 and D185 feature a cantilever low wing, two seats in a side-by-side enclosed cockpit configuration, fixed conventional landing gear and a single engine in tractor configuration.

A tricycle landing gear-equipped version is designated D19 for the amateur-built category and D195 for the microlight category.

All the aircraft in the series are all made with a wooden structure, covered in doped aircraft fabric. The 7.50 m (24.6 ft) span wing employs polyhedral configuration with the outer wing panels exhibiting much greater dihedral. Engines used include the 85 hp (63 kW) Jabiru 2200 four-stroke powerplant as well as Rotax, Limbach Flugmotoren and 58 hp (43 kW) Volkswagen 1600 automotive engines.

== Variants ==
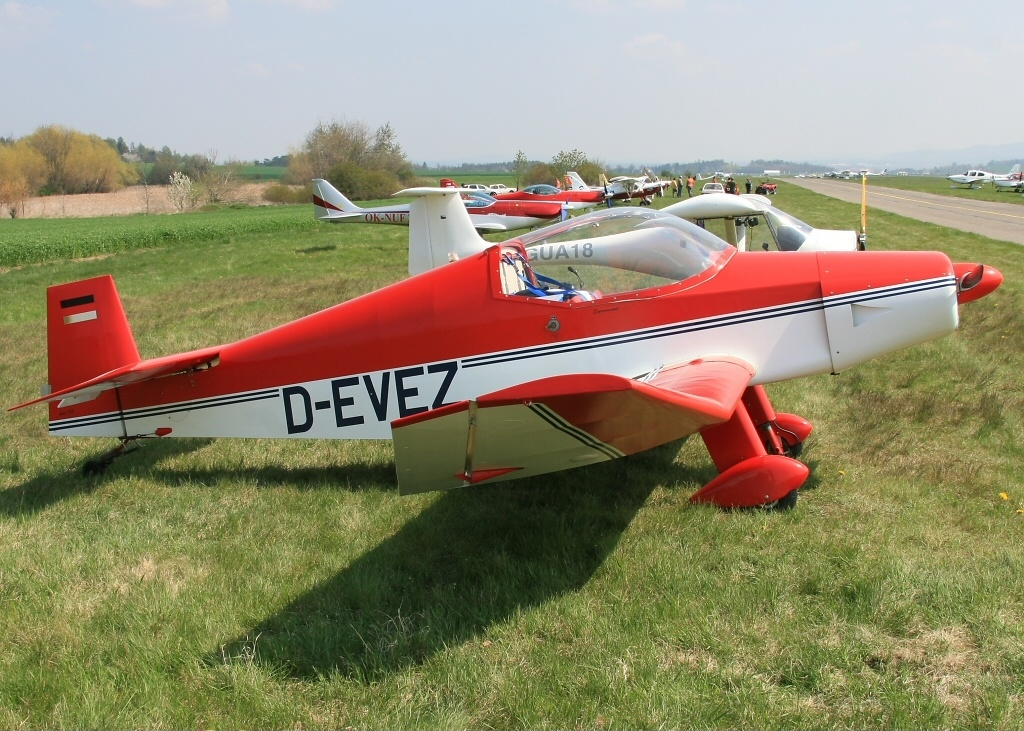
Jodel D18

D18
Original design for the amateur-built category.
D185
Model with tailwheel landing gear and larger flaps for the European microlight category.
D19
Model with tricycle landing gear for the amateur-built category.
D195
Model with tricycle landing gear and larger flaps for the European microlight category.

== Specifications (D185) ==
Data from Bayerl

General characteristics

- Crew: one
- Capacity: one passenger
- Wingspan: 7.50 m (24 ft 7 in)
- Wing area: 10.5 m^{2} (113 sq ft)
- Empty weight: 230 kg (507 lb)
- Gross weight: 450 kg (992 lb)
- Fuel capacity: 65 litres (14 imp gal; 17 US gal)
- Powerplant: 1 × Jabiru 2200 four cylinder, air-cooled, four stroke aircraft engine, 63 kW (85 hp)

Performance

- Maximum speed: 235 km/h (146 mph, 127 kn)
- Cruise speed: 220 km/h (140 mph, 120 kn)
- Stall speed: 60 km/h (37 mph, 32 kn)
- Rate of climb: 6 m/s (1,200 ft/min)
