= Merville D.63 =

D.63
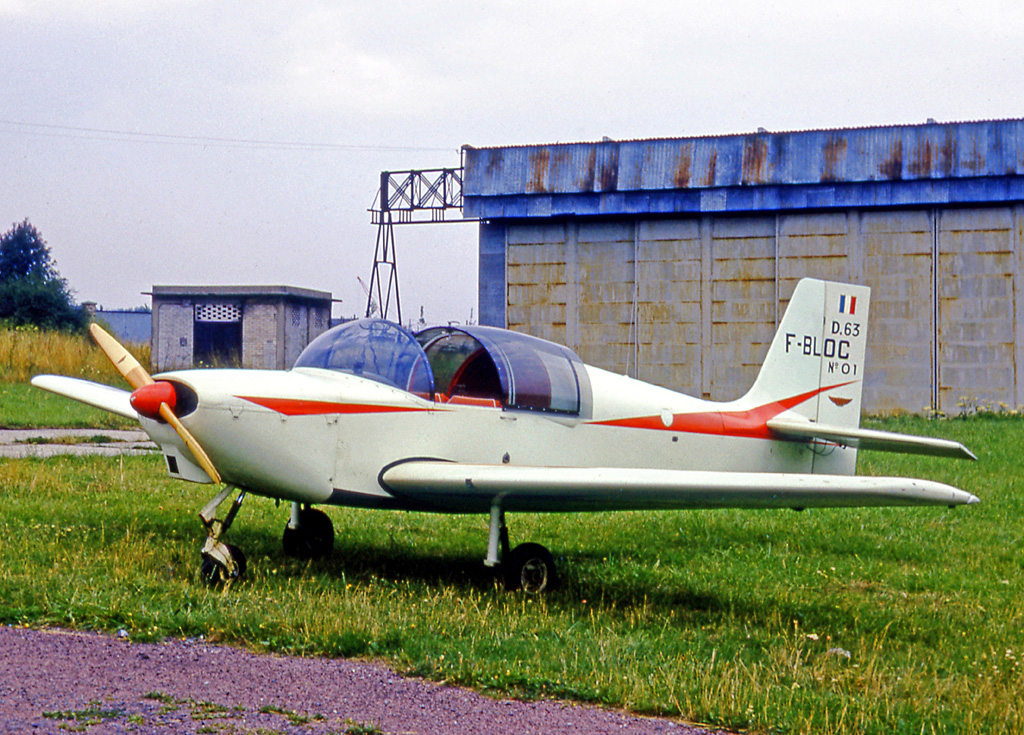
- The sole D.63 at St Cyr l'École airfield near Paris in 1965

General information
- Type: Side by side trainer
- National origin: France
- Manufacturer: Helice G. Merville
- Designer: André Merville
- Number built: 1

History
- First flight: 23 March 1962

The Merville D.63 was a modification of the Druine D.62 Condor with a nosewheel undercarriage, modified fin and French engine. It flew in 1962.

== Development ==
In the 1960s, André Merville was president of the Boulogne based company Helice G. Merville, which had been the chief supplier of wooden propellers for French aircraft since the end of World War I. He sought to broaden the firm's product range by producing both light aircraft and gliders, several of which were versions of other manufacturer's designs. The Merville D.63 was one example, a modified Druine D.62 Condor with a French, rather than American engine and a tricycle undercarriage.

The D.63 was wood framed and covered with a mixture of plywood and fabric. It was a low wing cantilever monoplane with 5.83° of dihedral. Its tapered wings were based on two spruce spars and ply covered around the leading edge with fabric elsewhere; the Frise ailerons were constructed in the same way. The D.63 had no flaps but light alloy air brakes were mounted under the wings at 37% chord. The fixed fin and ground adjustable tailplane were ply covered, mounting fabric covered control surfaces. There was a trim tab in the port elevator. The fuselage was entirely ply covered. Pilot and passenger sat side by side under a rear sliding canopy. The D.63 had a fixed, unfaired tricycle undercarriage with wheels mounted on cantilever legs with shock absorbers. Its 78 kW (105 hp) Potez 4E-20 air cooled flat four engine drove a two blade propeller made by Melville Helices.

The D.63 first flew on 23 March 1962 and appeared at the Cannes light aircraft show in July that year.

== Specifications ==
Data from Jane's All the World's Aircraft p.47

General characteristics

- Crew: Two
- Length: 6.75 m (22 ft 2 in)
- Wingspan: 8.38 m (27 ft 6 in)
- Height: 2.25 m (7 ft 5 in)
- Wing area: 11.50 m^{2} (123.8 sq ft)
- Empty weight: 460 kg (1,014 lb) with oil
- Max takeoff weight: 703 kg (1,550 lb)
- Fuel capacity: 105 L (23.1 Imp gal; 27.2 US gal)
- Maximimum wing loading: 61 kg/m^{2} (12.5 lb/sqft)
- Maximum power loading: 14.8 lb/hp (9.0 kg/kW)
- Powerplant: 1 × Potez 4E-20 air cooled flat four, 78 kW (105 hp)
- Propellers: 2-bladed Merville 963, wooden, fixed pitch

Performance

- Maximum speed: 215 km/h (134 mph, 116 kn) at sea level; like all the performance figures, this is at maximum take-off weight
- Cruise speed: 195 km/h (121 mph, 105 kn)
- Stall speed: 80 km/h (50 mph, 43 kn)
- Range: 850 km (530 mi, 460 nmi) with maximum fuel
