= Alitalia Flight 771 =

1962 aviation accident

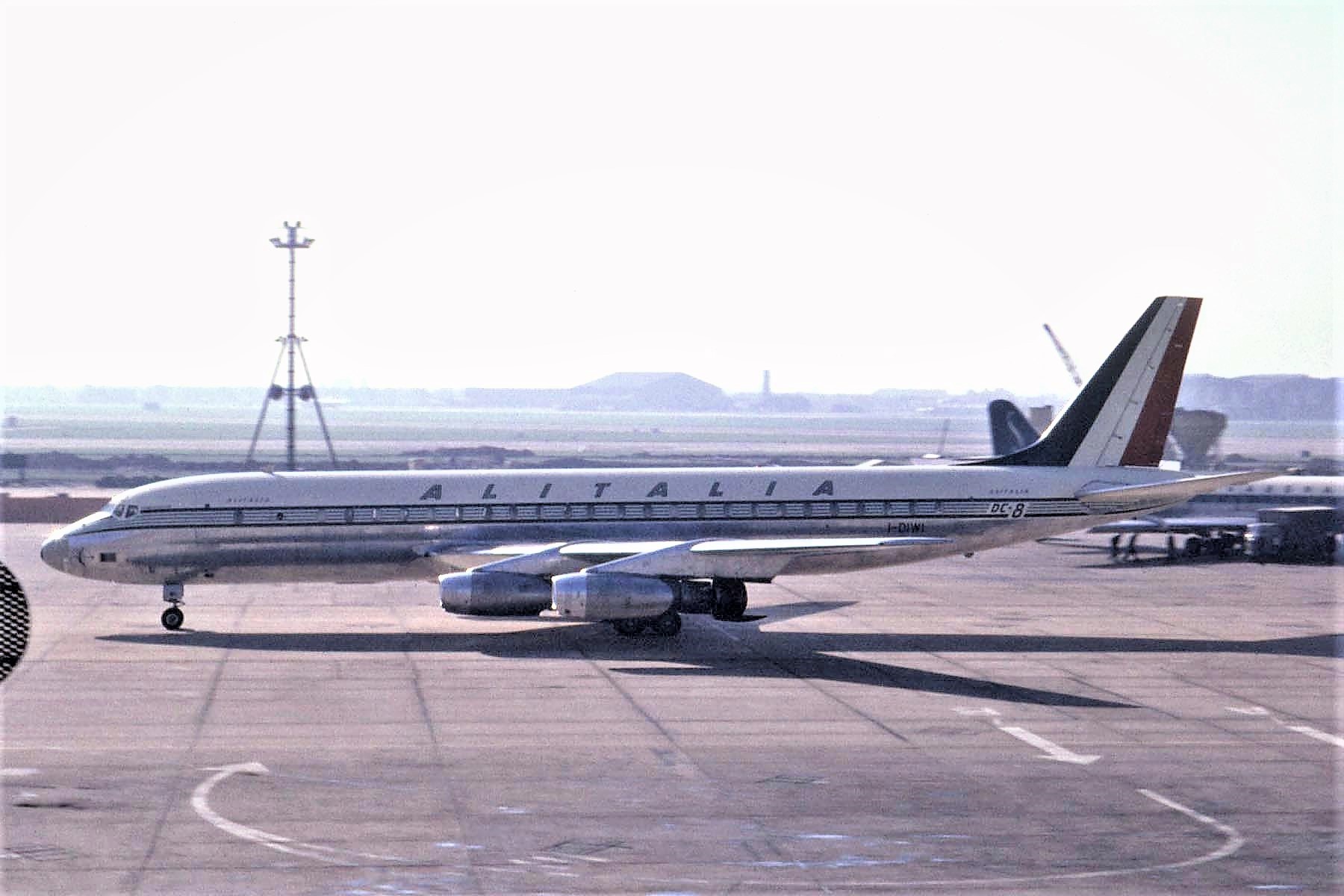
- An Alitalia Douglas DC-8 similar to the one involved

Accident
- Date: 7 July 1962, 18:40 UTC (8 July 1962, 00:10 local)
- Summary: Controlled flight into terrain due to pilot error
- Site: 11 km (6.8 mi; 5.9 nmi) NW of Junnar, Maharashtra, India; 19°12′0″N 73°52′48″E

Aircraft
- Aircraft type: Douglas DC-8-43
- Aircraft name: Lanzerotto Malocello
- Operator: Alitalia
- IATA flight No.: AZ771
- ICAO flight No.: AZA771
- Call sign: ALITALIA 771
- Registration: I-DIWD
- Flight origin: Kingsford-Smith Airport, Sydney, Australia
- 1st stopover: Darwin International Airport, Darwin, Australia
- 2nd stopover: Don Mueang International Airport, Bangkok, Thailand
- 3rd stopover: Bombay Airport, Bombay, India
- 4th stopover: Jinnah International Airport, Karachi, Pakistan
- Last stopover: Mehrabad Airport, Tehran, Iran
- Destination: Leonardo da Vinci-Fiumicino Airport, Rome, Italy
- Occupants: 94
- Passengers: 85
- Crew: 9
- Fatalities: 94
- Survivors: 0

Alitalia Flight 771 was a multi-leg Douglas DC-8-43 international scheduled flight from Sydney via Darwin, Bangkok, Bombay, Karachi, and Tehran to Rome with 94 on board. On 7 July 1962 18:40 UTC (8 July 1962, 00:10 local) it crashed into a hill about 84 kilometres (52 mi) north-east of Bombay while on approach.

== Background ==
=== Aircraft ===
The aircraft involved was a Douglas DC-8-43 constructed in 1962 and registered as I-DIWD to Alitalia. At the time of the accident, the aircraft had recorded 964 flight hours. The captain of the flight had signed the Certificate of Maintenance on 6 July 1962. The aircraft was equipped with a VHF navigation receiver, glide slope receiver, marker beacon receiver, ADF receiver, Loran receiver, doppler radar, and a transponder; but the aircraft did not have any flight recorders.

No mechanical issues were reported, and the centre of gravity and weight of the DC-8 were within permitted parameters.

=== Crew ===
Nine crew members were aboard the flight. The cockpit crew consisted of:

- Captain Luigi Quattrin, who was 50 years old and had been a pilot since 1939. He had accumulated 13,700 flight hours, of which 1,396 were on the Douglas DC-8. He had previously flown the Rome-Bombay route on DC-6 and DC-7 aircraft but did not go all the way to Bangkok. On the familiarization flight for the Bangkok-Bombay route, which was required by Alitalia in order for him to be permitted to fly the route as pilot-in-command, he flew the route to Bangkok via the Tehran-Karachi-Bombay route.
- The co-pilot, Ugo Arcangeli, was 33 years old and had been a pilot since 1956. He had accumulated a total of 3,480 flight hours, of which 1,672 had been from flying as co-pilot on the DC-8.
- The flight engineer, Luciano Fontana, was 31 years old and had 4,070 flight hours, of which 386 were from flying on the DC-8.

The remaining six members of the crew were flight attendants. Both the captain and co-pilot were trained navigators, but there was no individual navigator in the flight crew.

== Synopsis ==
After starting initially with 45 passengers in Sydney and taking on more passengers on the stops to Darwin and Singapore, Flight 771 departed from Bangkok at 15:16 UTC with 94 people aboard as stated by the load sheet, although the official flight plan stated there was to be 98 people aboard. The flight plan was not signed by the pilot-in-command, a violation of the Alitalia Operations Manual.

Flight 771 first made communications with Bombay Flight Information Center at 17:20, during which the flight requested a weather forecast for landing, as well as stating their estimated time of arrival to be 18:45 and their altitude to be 36,000 feet (11,000 m). Between the times of 17:30 and 17:47 they were informed of the local weather forecast; Various weather reports for Bombay at the time of the accident indicated that there was light rain but no thunderstorms or other dangerous conditions.

At 18:20 the flight switched to the Bombay approach frequency and requested to initiate descent when over the point of Aurangabad to an altitude of 20,000 feet (6,100 m). The descent was approved and the weather information provided was acknowledged.

The flight initiated descent at 18:24:36 UTC, descending from 35,000 to 20,000 feet (10,700 to 6,100 m) approximately twenty minutes before it was due to land at Bombay with an ETA at 18:45. At 18:25 the flight was cleared to take a transition level of 4,000 feet (1,200 m). Weather information was transmitted again at 18:28:04, with the QNH at 29.58 inches. At 18:29 the air traffic controller was informed of the flight's preference to land on runway 27. At 18:38:34 the flight was asked if it would be making a 360° over the beacon or landing in directly. At 18:38:49 the flight only replied "OK" leading to some confusion as to which approach would be taken. The flight clarified shortly thereafter that it would make a 360° over the outer beacon.

At 18:38:54 the DC-8 reached an altitude of 5,000 feet; the flight plan provided by Alitalia prescribed a 100-mile (160 km) descent to Bombay in 13 minutes. The flight continued descending further to 3,600 feet (1,100 m), well below the minimum safety altitude at 9,000 feet (2,700 m) as well as below the 4,000 feet (1,200 m) minimum initial approach altitude.

The last communication heard from the aircraft was at 18:39:58 again confirming the 360° over the beacon. The DC-8 crashed into Davandyachi hill on a bearing of 240°. The wreckage of the aircraft was found scattered among trees on the hill with the remains of the cockpit altimeter at an altitude of 3,600 feet (1,100 m), only 5 feet (1.5 m) short of the top. The DC-8 was completely destroyed and all persons aboard perished in the crash.

== Causes ==
Investigators explored several potential causes, including: navigational errors which led the pilot to believe that he was nearer to his destination than he actually was; failure to maintain the recommended safe altitude; and pilot's unfamiliarity with the flight route. Pilot intoxication was initially suggested but ruled out as a contributing cause. Chart number 21 from the radio facility did not show the terrain the flight crashed into and only indicated the presence of a location 13 miles (11 nmi; 21 km) to the north at a height of 5,400 feet (1,600 m).

Investigators concluded that errors in navigation led the pilot to think he was closer to the necessary point of descent than in reality, resulting in a premature descent for a straight-in instrument approach at night, resulting in controlled flight into terrain.

Secondary causes of the accident were cited as follows by the ICAO:

"1. Failure on the part of the pilot to make use of the navigational facilities available in order to ascertain the correct position, of the aircraft.
2. Infringement of the prescribed minimum safe altitude.
3. Unfamiliarity of the pilot with the terrain on the route."

== See also ==
- Air Inter Flight 148
- Crossair Flight 3597
- Indian Airlines Flight 605
