= Édouard Joly =

French aerospace engineer (1898–1982)

Édouard Joly (abt 1896–1982) was a French businessman and aeroplane designer. He is best known for founding the Jodel company with Jean Délémontez and their design of the Jodel and Robin ranges of light aircraft.

== Biography ==
Joly was born in Burgundy about 1896.

Joly worked for 14 years at a company that sold and repaired farm equipment. During First World War, he was mobilized as an aviation mechanic and stationed first in Avord and then in Dijon. At the end of the war, he returned to the farm equipment company, of which he would later become the owner.

In 1932, he became a founding member of the air club Beaunois. He then built and owned several light aircraft, including a Flying Flea. In 1946, Joly and his son-in-law Jean Délémontez obtained an old World War II biplane, fixed it up and retrofitted it with a Poinsard engine. In 1948, Joly test flew the plane, later dubbed the D9 Bebe. When news got out, the French government put in an order. Joly and Délémontez founded the Jodel company for studying, building and repairing airplanes. The Jodel name came from the pair's surnames, Joly and Delemontez. Together, they designed the Jodel line of planes. Pierre Robin modified a Jodel to create a Robin and, together, Robin and Délémontez would create the Robin DR series of planes.

== Death and legacy ==
Joly died in 1982. He was 86.

In 1986, Geoffrey Jones writing in Aircraft Annual 1987 wrote:

Some names will for ever be associated with France and that country's sport aviation movement. From Blériot at the start, through the infamy of Henri Mignet and his Pou du Ciels, to Joly and Delemontez' Jodels, the French have always been at the forefront in the homebuilt and sport aeroplane world.
