= Jean Délémontez =

French aerospace engineer

- Born: 9 June 1918; Lyon, France
- Died: 7 July 2015 (aged 97); France
- Occupation: aircraft designer

Jean Délémontez (9 June 1918 – 7 July 2015) was a French aircraft designer. He was born in Lyon in June 1918. He is best known for his work with his father-in-law, Édouard Joly, on the Jodel range of light aircraft and his collaboration with Pierre Robin on the Avions Robin aircraft range.

== Career ==
In 1935 Delemontez joined the French airforce, where, despite numerous tries, he never managed to become a pilot. He demonstrated mechanical competences early in the career. In 1936 he had already designed his first aircraft, the D1. After studying at the Rochefort school of mechanics, he was assigned maintenance duties for the fighter aircraft of that time. In 1941 he entered the design bureau of the airforce in Toulouse. At night he proceeded with his own designs and two years later he began working for Amiot. He worked at the design bureau before joining Edouard Joly at his company for repairing agricultural machines. It was with Joly that he founded the "Société des avions Jodel" in 1946. In December 2000 Délémontez was inducted into the Experimental Aircraft Association Homebuilders' Hall of Fame. He died at the age of 97 on July 7, 2015.
