= Poinsard 25hp 2-cyl =

Aircraft engine model

Mengin B
- Type: Air-cooled flat-twin piston engine
- National origin: France
- Manufacturer: Mengin
- Designer: René Poinsard
- Manufactured: 1933-40

The Poinsard 25 hp or Mengin Type B is a small, two-cylinder, air-cooled, horizontally opposed aircraft engine built in France. it was manufactured by Établissements Pierre Mengin from a design by René Poinsard. Power was around 19 kW (25 hp) at 2,280 rpm.

== Design and development ==
The first two engines built by Mengin were designed by René Poinsard and are often referred to by his name The Mengin B or Poinsard 25 hp was the first and smaller of the two. Aimed at very small, single seat sport aircraft it went into production from about 1933. Production ceased when France was invaded in 1940.

== Variants ==
Mengin B
As below.
Mengin B geared
Maximum continuous 22 kW (29 hp) at 1,450 propeller rpm, take-off 24 kW (32 hp) at 1,580 propeller rpm.

== Applications ==
Data from Horizontally Opposed Aero Engines unless other source indicated

- Bessard-Millevoye Moineau
- Botali-P.A.M.A.
- Brochet MB-30
- Eklund TE-1
- Gatard AG.01 Alouette (geared)
- Guilemin Sportplane (geared)
- JDM Roitelet
- Jodel D.93
- Mignet HM.8
- Mignet HM.14
- Nippi NH-1 Hibari
- Piel CP-10 Pinocchio
- SFCA Taupin
- Avia 50-MP

== Specifications ==
Data from Horizontally Opposed Aero Engines

=== General characteristics ===
- Type: Air-cooled flat-twin
- Bore: 94 mm (3.70 in)
- Stroke: 90 mm (3.54 in)
- Displacement: 1.249 L (76.22 cu in)
- Dry weight: 35 kg (77 lb)

=== Components ===
- Fuel system: Single or double magneto choice
- Cooling system: Air

=== Performance ===
- Power output: Maximum continuous 19 kW (25 hp) at 2,280 rpm, take-off 21 kW (28 hp) at 2,500 rpm
