= List of civil aircraft (N–Z) =

List of civil aircraft (N-Z) is a list of articles on civilian aircraft with descriptions, which excludes aircraft operated by military organizations in civil markings, warbirds, warbirds used for racing, replica warbirds and research aircraft.

== N ==
=== Nakajima ===
- Nakajima AT-2 twin-engine airliner

=== National Aerospace Laboratories (NAL) ===
- NAL Saras Regional turboprop airliner
- NAL NM5 cabin lightplane

=== National Air Service ===
- NAS Air King three-passenger utility biplane

=== Nationale Vliegtuig Industrie (NVI) ===
- NVI F.K.33 trimotor monoplane airliner

=== NAMC ===
- NAMC YS-11 twin turboprop regional airliner

=== New Standard ===
- New Standard D-24, D-25, D-26, D.27, D.28 and D.30 five-seat utility and crop dusting biplane
- New Standard D-29, D.31, D.32 and D.33 training biplane

=== Nicholas-Beazley ===
- Nicholas-Beazley NB-3 two-seat parasol training monoplane
- Nicholas-Beazley NB-8G two-seat low-wing sports monoplane

=== Nieuport & Nieuport-Delage ===
- Nieuport II single-seat racing/sport monoplane
- Nieuport IV two-seat racing/sport monoplane
- Nieuport VI two-seat racing/sport monoplane
- Nieuport-Delage Sesquiplan racing monoplane
- Nieuport-Delage NiD 30 single-engine biplane airliner
- Nieuport-Delage NiD 37 racing aircraft
- Nieuport-Delage NiD 38 single-engine mail/airliner biplane
- Nieuport-Delage NiD 39 single-engine mail/airliner biplane
- Nieuport-Delage NiD 540 single-engine monoplane airliner
- Nieuport-Delage NiD 640 single-engine monoplane airliner
- Nieuport-Delage NiD 940 single-engine touring airplane

=== Noorduyn ===
- Noorduyn Norseman utility transport

=== Norsk Flyindustri ===
- Norsk Flyindustri Finnmark 5A twin-engine amphibious flying-boat airliner

=== North American ===
- North American Rockwell 100 Darter/Lark Commander four-seat light aircraft
- North American Navion four/five-seat light aircraft
- North American Rockwell OV-10 Bronco modified for fighting forest fires

=== Northrop ===
- Northrop Alpha single-engine monoplane mailplane and airliner
- Northrop Beta single-engine monoplane sportsplane
- Northrop Delta single-engine monoplane airliner
- Northrop Gamma single-engine monoplane mailplane and racer

=== NuWaco ===
- NuWaco T-10 single-engine three-seat biplane

== O ==
=== Ogden ===
- Ogden Osprey trimotor monoplane airliner

=== Omega Aircraft ===
- Omega BS-12 utility helicopter

== P ==
=== Pakistan Aeronautical Complex ===
- PAC Super Mushshak two-seat light aircraft
- PAC MFI-17 Mushshak two-seat light aircraft

=== Pacific Aerospace ===
- Pacific Aerospace CT-4 Airtrainer two/three-seat basic trainer
- Pacific Aerospace Fletcher FU-24 top dresser
- Pacific Aerospace Cresco top dresser & utility aircraft
- Pacific Aerospace 750XL utility aircraft

=== Pander & Son ===
- Pander D single-seat sport and racing monoplane
- Pander E two-seat sport and training biplane
- Pander P-1 two-seat racing monoplane
- Pander S-4 Postjäger monoplane trimotor mailplane
- Pander Multipro two/three-seat light sports monoplane

=== Paramount ===
- Paramount Cabinaire cabin biplane airliner

=== Parks ===
- Parks P-1 training biplane
- Parks P-2 training biplane

=== Parnall ===
- Parnall Heck single-engined four-seat cabin monoplane
- Parnall Imp single-engined two-seat biplane
- Parnall Pixie two-seat ultralight that could be flown as a biplane or monoplane
- Parnall Elf two-seat touring biplane

=== Partenavia ===
- Partenavia P.53 Aeroscooter single-seat ultralight autogyro
- Partenavia P.55 Tornado two-seat mid-wing monoplane
- Partenavia P.68 Victor six/seven-place light twin

=== Pasped ===
- Pasped W-1 Skylark two-seat low wing monoplane

=== Percival & Hunting Percival ===
- Percival Gull single-engine three-seat cabin monoplane
- Percival Vega Gull single-engine four-seat cabin monoplane
- Percival Mew Gull single-seat racing monoplane
- Percival Petrel twin-engine airliner
- Percival Proctor single-engine three or four-seat cabin monoplane
- Percival Merganser twin-engine airliner
- Percival Prince twin-engine airliner

=== Pheasant Aircraft Company ===
- Pheasant H-10 two-seat open-cockpit biplane

=== Piel ===
- Piel CP.10 Pinocchio
- Piel CP.20 Pinocchio I
- Piel CP.40 Donald
- Piel CP.402
- Piel CP.41
- Piel CP.100
- Piel CP.140
- Piel CP.500
- Piel Beryl
- Piel Diamant
- Piel Emeraude
- Piel Emeraude Club
- Piel Smaragd
- Piel Super Diamant
- Piel Super Emeraude
- Piel Pinocchio II
- Piel Saphir
- Piel Onyx
- Piel Zephir

=== Piaggio ===
- Piaggio P.136 twin-engine amphibious utility flying-boat
- Piaggio P.149 single piston-engine trainer
- Piaggio P.166 Portofino commuter airliner and utility transport
- Piaggio P.180 Avanti twin turboprop executive transport
- Piaggio PD.808 twin-engine business jet

=== Pietenpol ===
- Pietenpol Air Camper two-seat homebuilt parasol-wing ultralight
- Pietenpol Sky Scout two-seat homebuilt parasol-wing ultralight

=== Pilatus ===
- Pilatus B-4/PC-11 single-seat competition sailplane
- Pilatus PC-6 Porter and Turbo Porter STOL utility transport
- Pilatus PC-12 single-engine regional airliner and corporate turboprop
- Pilatus PC-24 light corporate jet

=== Piper ===
- Piper Aerostar six-seat light twin
- Piper Cub Two-seat high-wing light aircraft
- Piper J-2 Cub two-seat high-wing light aircraft
- Piper J-3 Cub two-seat high-wing light aircraft
- Piper J-4 Cub Coupe two-seat high-wing light aircraft
- Piper J-5 Cub Cruiser three-seat high-wing light aircraft
- Piper PA-6 Sky Sedan four-seat low-wing light aircraft
- Piper PA-7 Skycoupe two-seat low-wing light aircraft
- Piper PA-8 Skycycle single-seat low-wing light aircraft
- Piper PA-11 Cub Special two-seat high-wing light aircraft
- Piper PA-12 Super Cruiser three-seat high-wing light aircraft
- Piper PA-14 Family Cruiser four-seat high-wing light aircraft
- Piper PA-15 Vagabond two-seat high-wing light aircraft
- Piper PA-16 Clipper four-seat high-wing light aircraft
- Piper PA-17 Vagabond two-seat high-wing light aircraft
- Piper PA-18 Super Cub two-seat utility light aircraft
- Piper PA-20 Pacer three or four-seat light aircraft
- Piper PA-22 Tri-Pacer, Caribbean & Colt two, three and four-seat light aircraft
- Piper PA-23 Apache & Aztec four-seat light twin
- Piper PA-24 Comanche four-seat light aircraft
- Piper PA-25 Pawnee Agricultural aircraft
- Piper PA-28 Cherokee Series light aircraft
- Piper PA-28R Cherokee Arrow four-seat light aircraft
- Piper PA-30/39 Twin Comanche light twin
- Piper PA-31 Chieftain/Mojave/T-1020/T-1040 corporate transport and commuter airliner
- Piper PA-31 Navajo/Pressurized Navajo corporate transport and commuter airliner
- Piper PA-31T Cheyenne twin turboprop corporate transports
- Piper PA-32 Cherokee Six, Lance & Saratoga six-seat light aircraft
- Piper PA-34 Seneca six-place light twin
- Piper PA-36 Pawnee Brave crop duster
- Piper PA-38 Tomahawk two-seat light aircraft
- Piper PA-40 Arapaho twin-engined transport
- Piper PA-42 Cheyenne III, IIIA & 400LS twin turboprop corporate transports
- Piper PA-44 Seminole four-seat light twin
- Piper PA-46 Malibu, Malibu Mirage and Malibu Meridian six-seat corporate turboprop

=== Pipistrel d.o.o Ajdovščina ===
- Pipistrel Alpha Trainer
- Pipistrel Apis
- Pipistrel Apis 13
- Pipistrel Apis 15 M
- Pipistrel Panthera
- Pipistrel Sinus
- Pipistrel Spider
- Pipistrel Taurus
- Pipistrel Taurus G4
- Pipistrel Taurus Electro
- Pipistrel Virus
- Pipistrel Virus SW
- Pipistrel WATTsUP
- Pipistrel 801 eVTOL

=== Pisarenko ===
- Pisarenko VOP-1 single-seat sporting monoplane
- Pisarenko T single-seat experimental monoplane

=== Pitts ===
- Pitts Special Miss Dayton
- Pitts Special Li'l Monster
- Pitts S1 Special
- Pitts S1 Li'l Stinker
- Pitts S1
- Pitts S2
- Pitts Model 12 Macho Stinker

=== Pitcairn/Pitcairn-Cierva ===
- Pitcairn PA-1 Fleetwing six-seat passenger and mail biplane
- Pitcairn PA-2 Sesquiwing biplane mailplne
- Pitcairn PA-3 Orowing biplane mailplane
- Pitcairn PA-4 Fleetwing II sport biplane
- Pitcairn Mailwing biplane mail plane
- Pitcairn PA-18 two-seat open-cockpit autogyro
- Pitcairn PA-19 four-seat cabin autogyro
- Pitcairn PAA-1/PA-20 two-seat open-cockpit autogyro
- Pitcairn PCA-2/PA-21 2-seat open-cockpit autogyro

=== Platzer ===
- Platzer Kiebitz
- Platzer Motte

=== Poberezny ===
- Poberezny P-5 Pober Sport
- Poberezny Pober Acro Sport
- Poberezny Pober Little Audrey
- Poberezny P-9 Pober Pixie
- Poberezny Pober Super Ace

=== Pocino ===
- Pocino PJ.1A

=== Polikarpov ===
- Polikarpov R-5 biplane airliner based on P-5
- Polikarpov PM-1 cabin biplane airliner
- Polikarpov P-Z biplane airliner based on R-Z
- Polikarpov U-2 open-cockpit utility and agricultural biplane

=== Ponnier ===
- Ponnier D.I
- Ponnier D.III
- Ponnier L.1

=== Porterfield Aircraft Corporation ===
- Porterfield 35 two-seat high-wing cabin monoplane
- Porterfield Collegiate two-seat high-wing cabin monoplane

=== Potez ===
- Potez 29 single-engine biplane airliner
- Potez 43 single-engine light utility/touring monoplane
- Potez 56 twin-engine low-wing monoplane airliner
- Potez 58 single-engine light utility/touring monoplane
- Potez 60 two-seat parasol utility/trainer monoplane
- Potez 62 twin-engine monoplane airliner
- Potez 840 four-engine turboprop executive transport

=== Pottier ===
- Pottier P.40
- Pottier P.50 Bouvereuil
- Pottier P.60 Minacro
- Pottier P.70
- Pottier P.80
- Pottier P.100
- Pottier P.105TS
- Pottier P.110TS
- Pottier P.130 Coccinelle
- Pottier P.170S
- Pottier P.180S
- Pottier P.210S Coati
- Pottier P.220S Koala
- Pottier P.230S Panda
- Pottier P.240S Saiga
- Pottier P.250S Xerus
- Pottier P.270S Amster

=== Poullin ===
- Poullin J.5A
- Poullin J.5B
- Poullin JP.20 Globe Trotter
- Poullin JP.30

=== Praga ===
- Praga E.114 two-seat sports monoplane
- Praga E-210 and 211 twin-engine light transport

=== PWS ===
- PWS-21 single-engine 4-passenger monoplane airliner
- PWS-24 single-engine 4-passenger monoplane airliner
- PWS-54 single-engine 3-passenger monoplane airliner

=== PZL ===
- PZL.4 trimotor monoplane airliner
- PZL.5 two-seat open-cockpit sporting and training biplane
- PZL.16 single-engine passenger monoplane
- PZL.19 three-seat sports monoplane
- PZL.26 three-seat sports monoplane
- PZL.27 trimotor monoplane airliner and mailplane
- PZL.44 Wicher twin-engine low wing monoplane airliner

=== PZL Mielec ===
- PZL M-18 Dromader crop spraying/firefighter aircraft
- PZL M-20 Mewa license-built Piper PA-34 Seneca
- PZL M-28 Skytruck utility aircraft

=== PZL Świdnik ===
- PZL Świdnik (Mil) Mi-2 twin turboshaft utility helicopter
- PZL Kania twin turboshaft utility helicopter
- PZL W-3 Sokół twin-engine utility helicopter
- PZL SW-4 Puszczyk utility helicopter

=== PZL Warszawa-Okęcie ===
- PZL-101 Gawron four-seat utility aircraft
- PZL-102 Kos two-seat touring and training monoplane
- PZL-104 Wilga four-seat utility aircraft
- PZL-105 Flaming single-engine 6-seat high-wing monoplane utility aircraft
- PZL-106 Kruk low-wing monoplane cropduster monoplane
- PZL-110 Koliber four-seat light aircraft based on MS.880
- PZL-112 Junior two-seat flying club trainer

== Q ==
=== Quest Aircraft ===
- Quest Kodiak turboprop utility monoplane

=== Questair ===
- Questair Venture two-seat sporting monoplane

=== Quicksilver Manufacturing ===
- Quicksilver GT400 single-seat high-wing pusher kitplane ultralight
- Quicksilver GT500 two-seat high-wing pusher kitplane ultralight

=== Quickie ===
- QAC Quickie single-seat tandem wing sports aircraft
- QAC Quickie Q2 & Q200 two-seat tandem wing sports aircraft
- Quickie Free Enterprise high wing monoplane for around the world flight attempt

== R ==
=== Raab-Katzenstein ===
- Raab-Katzenstein RK.9 Grasmücke two-seat touring biplane
- Raab-Katzenstein RK.25 two-seat touring monoplane
- Raab-Katzenstein RK-26 two-seat trainer and aerobatic biplane

=== Rafaelyants ===
- Rafaelyants PR-5 single-engine cabin biplane developed from Polikarpov R-5
- Rafaelyants PR-12 cabin monoplane developed from Polikarpov R-5
- Rafaelyants RAF-1 single-seat low-wing sporting monoplane
- Rafaelyants RAF-2 two-seat low-wing sporting monoplane
- Rafaelyants RAF-11 twin-engine low-wing monoplane airliner

=== Rans ===
- Rans S-4 and S-5 Coyote single-seat high-wing monoplanes
- Rans S-6 Coyote II two-seat high-wing monoplane
- Rans S-7 Courier tandem two-seat high-wing monoplane
- Rans S-9 Chaos single-seat mid-wing monoplane
- Rans S-10 Sakota two-seat mid-wing monoplane
- Rans S-11 Pursuit single-seat low-wing monoplane
- Rans S-12 and S-14 Airaile, S-17 Stinger and S-18 1 or 2-seat pusher high-wing monoplane ultralights
- Rans S-16 Shekari two-seat low-wing aerobatic monoplane
- Rans S-19 Venterra two-seat low-wing monoplane
- Rans S-20 Raven two-seat high-wing monoplane

=== Rawdon Brothers ===
- Rawdon T-1 two-seat low-wing utility monoplane

=== Raytheon ===
- Raytheon 390 Premier I light corporate jet
- Beechcraft 1900 regional airliner and corporate transport
- Raytheon Beechcraft Baron four or six-place twin-engine utility transport
- Raytheon Beechcraft Bonanza four- to six-seat light aircraft
- Raytheon Beechcraft King Air 200 twin turboprop utility transport
- Raytheon Beechcraft King Air 300 & 350 turboprop utility aircraft
- Raytheon Beechcraft King Air 90 & 100 twin turboprop utility transport
- Raytheon Hawker 400XP (formerly Beechjet 400) light corporate jet
- Raytheon Hawker 800 (formerly BAe 125) mid-size corporate jet
- Raytheon Hawker 1000 mid-size corporate jet
- Raytheon Hawker 4000 mid-size corporate jet

=== RBVZ (Russo Baltic Wagon Works) ===
- Sikorsky Russky Vityaz four-engine biplane airliner

=== Rearwin ===
- Rearwin Ken-Royce three-seat open-cockpit biplane
- Rearwin Junior small high-wing monoplane
- Rearwin Speedster high-wing enclosed cabin monoplane
- Rearwin Cloudster high-wing enclosed cabin monoplane
- Rearwin Sportster high-wing enclosed cabin monoplane
- Rearwin Skyranger high-wing enclosed cabin monoplane

=== Renard ===
- Renard R.17 single-engine cabin monoplane for flower delivery
- Renard R.30 four-passenger trimotor airliner
- Renard R.35 pressurized trimotor airliner

=== Reims ===
(licence built Cessna)

- Reims F150 Cessna 150
- Reims F152 Cessna 152
- Reims F172 Cessna 172
- Reims F177 Cessna 177
- Reims F182 Cessna 182
- Reims F337 Cessna 337
- Reims-Cessna F406 Cessna 406

=== Republic ===
- Republic RC-3 Seabee Four-seat amphibious light aircraft

=== RFB ===
- Rhein Flugzeugbau RW 3 Multoplan two-seat pusher monoplane

=== Robin ===
- Robin DR100 low-wing monoplane light aircraft
- Robin DR200 low-wing monoplane light aircraft
- Robin DR400 low-wing monoplane light aircraft
- Robin DR500 low-wing monoplane light aircraft
- Robin R2000two-seat training and aerobatic light aircraft
- Robin HR200 two-seat training and aerobatic light aircraft
- Robin R3000 two/four-seat light aircraft
- Robin Aiglon four-seat light aircraft

=== Robinson/Redwing ===
- Robinson Redwing two-seat single-engined biplane

=== Robinson Helicopter ===
- Robinson R22 two-seat piston-engined light helicopter
- Robinson R44 four-seat piston-engined light helicopter
- Robinson R66 four-seat turbine light helicopter

=== Rockwell ===
- Rockwell 500/520/560/680/685/720 Commander twin-engine utility transports
- Commander 112, 114 and Commander Premier 115 four-seat light aircraft
- Rockwell Sabreliner corporate jet

=== Rohrbach ===
- Rohrbach Rocco twin-engine monoplane flying boat airliner
- Rohrbach Roland trimotor monoplane airliner
- Rohrbach Romar trimotor monoplane flying boat airliner
- Rohrbach Rostra twin-engine monoplane mailplane flying boat

=== Rotorway ===
- RotorWay Exec two-seat kit helicopter
- RotorWay Scorpion homebuilt helicopter

=== Rumpler ===
- Rumpler 5A 2 converted reconnaissance biplane used for mail and passengers

=== Ruschmeyer ===
- Ruschmeyer R 90 four-seat light aircraft

=== Rutan ===
(see also Scaled Composites)

- Rutan VariViggen two-seat canard pusher
- Rutan VariEze two-seat canard pusher
- Rutan Defiant four-seat twin-engine cabin pusher
- Rutan Quickie single-seat tandem-wing aircraft
- Rutan Long-EZ two-seat canard pusher
- Rutan Voyager made non-stop unrefueled circumnavigation
- Rutan Solitaire canard sailplane

=== RWD ===
- RWD 1, 2, 3, 4 and 7 two-seat open-cockpit sports monoplanes
- RWD 5 two-seat cabin sports monoplane
- RWD 6 two-seat cabin sports monoplane
- RWD 8 two-seat open-cockpit parasol monoplane trainer
- RWD 9 two-seat cabin sports monoplane
- RWD 10 single-seat open-cockpit aerobatics monoplane
- RWD 11 twin-engine monoplane airliner
- RWD 13 three-seat cabin sports monoplane
- RWD 15 5-seat cabin sports monoplane
- RWD 16 two-seat low-wing sports monoplane
- RWD 17 two-seat open-cockpit aerobatics and training monoplane
- RWD-19 two-seat low-wing sports monoplane
- RWD 21 two-seat low-wing touring and sports monoplane

=== Ryan ===
- Ryan M-1 & M-2 single-engine monoplane mailplane
- Ryan Brougham single-engine monoplane airliner
- Ryan NYP "Spirit of St. Louis" long-distance flight record aircraft
- Ryan Foursome four-seat cabin monoplane
- Ryan ST "Sports-Trainer" single-engine two-seat monoplane
- Ryan S-C "Sports-Coupe" single-engine cabin monoplane
- Ryan Navion single-engine four-seat cabin monoplane

== S ==
=== Saab ===
- Saab 90 Scandia twin-engined airliner
- Saab 91 Safir single-engine trainer
- Saab 340 twin turboprop regional airliner
- Saab 2000 twin turboprop regional airliner

=== SABCA ===
- SABCA S.2 4-seat single-engine monoplane airliner
- SABCA S.11 trimotor monoplane airliner
- SABCA S.12 trimotor monoplane airliner
- SABCA S.30 parasol-wing ultralight

=== Sablatnig ===
- Sablatnig P.I biplane airliner converted from bomber
- Sablatnig P.III single-engine high-wing monoplane airliner

=== Sadler ===
- Sadler Vampire two-seat light-sport aircraft

=== Salmson ===
- Salmson 2 single-engine biplane mailplane converted from reconnaissance aircraft
- Salmson Phrygane, Phryganet & Phrygane Major 2 or 3-seat cabin monoplane
- Salmson Cri-Cri & Cri-Cri Major 2-seat open-cockpit parasol monoplane

=== Saunders (Canada) ===
- Saunders ST-27 twin-engine feederliner
- Saunders ST-28 twin-engine feederliner

=== Saunders-Roe/Saro (UK) ===
- Saro Cutty Sark twin-engine utility/training amphibious flying boat
- Saro Cloud twin-engine amphibious flying boat airliner
- Saro Windhover trimotor amphibious flying boat airliner
- Saunders-Roe Princess ten-engine flying boat airliner - largest all-metal flying boat ever built

=== Savoia-Marchetti ===
(see also SIAI-Marchetti)

- Savoia-Marchetti S.55 twin-engine monoplane flying boat utility transport
- Savoia-Marchetti S.56 single-engine sport biplane
- Savoia-Marchetti S.66 trimotor flying boat airliner
- Savoia-Marchetti S.71 trimotor monoplane airliner
- Savoia-Marchetti S.73 trimotor monoplane airliner
- Savoia-Marchetti S.74 4-engine monoplane airliner
- Savoia-Marchetti SM.75 Marsupiale trimotor airliner
- Savoia-Marchetti SM.80 2-seat utility/sports amphibian
- Savoia-Marchetti SM.83 trimotor monoplane airliner
- Savoia-Marchetti SM.84 twin-engine monoplane airliner, designation reused for unrelated bomber
- Savoia-Marchetti SM.87 floatplane trimotor monoplane airliner
- Savoia-Marchetti SM.95 four-engine monoplane airliner
- Savoia-Marchetti SM.102 twin-engine airliner

=== Scaled Composites ===
(see also Rutan)

- Scaled Composites White Knight experimental high-altitude jet to carry & launch SpaceShipOne
- Scaled Composites SpaceShipOne experimental spaceplane

=== Scheibe ===
- Scheibe Bergfalke two-seat mid-wing sailplane
- Scheibe Spatz competition sailplane
- Scheibe Zugvogel single-seat sailplane
- Scheibe SF-23 Sperling two-seat high-wing cabin monoplane
- Scheibe SF-24 Motor Spatz single-seat motor glider
- Scheibe SF-25 Falke two-seat motor glider
- Scheibe SF-26
- Scheibe SF-27 single-seat sailplane
- Scheibe SF-28 Tandem Falke two-seat motor glider
- Scheibe SF-34 two-seat sailplane
- Scheibe SF-36 two-seat motor glider
- Scheibe SF 40 two-seat ultralight

=== Schempp-Hirth ===
- Göppingen Gö 1 Wolf I single-seat sailplane
- Göppingen Gö 3 Minimoa single-seat sailplane
- Göppingen Gö 4 training sailplane
- Göppingen Gö 5 single-seat training glider
- Schempp-Hirth Standard Austria aerobatic sailplane
- Schempp-Hirth Cirrus competition sailplane
- Schempp-Hirth Standard Cirrus competition sailplane
- Schempp-Hirth Discus competition sailplane
- Schempp-Hirth Discus-2 competition sailplane
- Schempp-Hirth Ventus competition sailplane
- Schempp-Hirth Ventus-2 competition sailplane
- Schempp-Hirth Nimbus competition sailplane
- Schempp-Hirth Nimbus-2 competition sailplane
- Schempp-Hirth Nimbus-3 single-seat competition sailplane
- Schempp-Hirth Nimbus-4 competition self-launching sailplane
- Schempp-Hirth Mini-Nimbus competition sailplane
- Schempp-Hirth Janus two-seat competition sailplane
- Schempp-Hirth Duo Discus two-seat competition sailplane

=== Schleicher ===
- Schleicher Luftkurort Poppenhausen primary training glider
- Schleicher Ka 2 Rhönschwalbe training glider
- Schleicher Ka 3 single-seat training glider
- Schleicher Ka-4 Rhönlerche II training glider
- Schleicher Ka 6 single-seat glider
- Schleicher K7 Rhönadler two-seat glider
- Schleicher K 8 single-seat homebuilt glider
- Schleicher ASW 12 competition sailplane
- Schleicher ASK 13 training glider
- Schleicher ASK 14 single-seat motor glider
- Schleicher ASW 15 competition sailplane
- Schleicher ASK 16 two-seat motor glider
- Schleicher ASW 17 competition sailplane
- Schleicher ASK 18 single-seat training sailplane
- Schleicher ASW 19 competition sailplane
- Schleicher ASW 20 competition sailplane
- Schleicher ASK 21 training glider
- Schleicher ASW 22 competition sailplane
- Schleicher ASK 23 competition sailplane
- Schleicher ASW 24 competition sailplane
- Schleicher ASH 25 two-seat competition sailplane
- Schleicher ASH 26 competition sailplane
- Schleicher ASW 27 competition sailplane
- Schleicher ASW 28 competition sailplane
- Schleicher ASG 29 competition sailplane

=== Schneider (Australia) ===
- Schneider ES-52 Kookaburra training sailplane
- Schneider ES-59 Arrow competition sailplane
- Schneider ES-65 Platypus training glider

=== Schweizer ===
- Schweizer SGS 1-23 competition sailplane
- Schweizer SGS 1-26 competition sailplane
- Schweizer SGS 2-32 two-seat training and competition sailplane
- Schweizer SGS 2-33 two-seat training glider
- Schweizer Ag Cat biplane crop duster built under licence from Grumman
- Schweizer 300 light utility helicopter
- Schweizer 330 light turbine utility helicopter

=== Scottish Aviation ===
- Scottish Aviation Jetstream turboprop regional airliner
- Scottish Aviation Twin Pioneer utility transport

=== Seversky ===
- Seversky AP-7 racing monoplane

=== Shanghai/Shaanxi ===
- Shaanxi Y-5 Chinese development of Antonov An-2
- Shaanxi Y-7 Chinese development of Antonov An-24
- Shaanxi Y-8 Chinese development of Antonov An-12
- Shaanxi Y-10 cancelled four-engine airliner
- Shaanxi Y-12 twin-engine light transport

=== Shavrov ===
- Shavrov Sh-2 single-engine utility monoplane amphibious flying boat

=== Short Brothers ===
- Short L.17 Scylla 4-engine biplane airliner
- Short S.8 Calcutta trimotor biplane airliner flying boat
- Short S.16 Scion twin-engine monoplane airliner
- Short S.17 Kent 4-engine biplane airliner flying boat
- Short S.22 Scion Senior 4-engine monoplane airliner
- Short Belfast Heavy lift turboprop freighter
- Short Empire 4-engine monoplane airliner flying boat
- Short Hythe 4-engine monoplane airliner flying boat
- Short Mayo Composite piggy-back long-range seaplane/flying boat mailplane combination
- Short Sandringham 4-engine monoplane airliner flying boat
- Short Sealand twin-engine monoplane airliner amphibious flying boat
- Short Skyvan & Skyliner utility transport
- Short Solent 4-engine monoplane airliner flying boat
- Short 330 Regional airliner and utility freighter
- Short 360 regional airliner

=== SIAI-Marchetti ===
(for earlier designs see Savoia-Marchetti)

- SIAI-Marchetti S.205 four-seat light airplane
- SIAI-Marchetti S.208 four-seat light airplane
- SIAI-Marchetti S.210 twin-engine 6-seat cabin monoplane
- SIAI-Marchetti FN.333 Riviera four-seat amphibian

=== Siebel ===
- Siebel Fh 104 twin-engine transport
- Siebel Si 201
- Siebel Si 202 two-seat monoplane sportsplane
- Siebel Si 204 twin-engine transport

=== Sikorsky ===
(for earlier types see RBVZ)

- Sikorsky S-36 twin-engine passenger amphibian
- Sikorsky S-38 twin-engine passenger amphibian
- Sikorsky S-39 single-engine passenger amphibian
- Sikorsky S-40 4-engine airliner flying boat
- Sikorsky S-42 4-engine airliner flying boat
- Sikorsky S-43 twin-engine airliner amphibious flying boat
- Sikorsky VS-44 four-engine airliner flying boat
- Sikorsky S-51 light utility helicopter
- Sikorsky S-55 utility helicopter
- Sikorsky S-58 utility helicopter
- Sikorsky S-61L & S61N utility helicopter
- Sikorsky S-62 utility helicopter
- Sikorsky S-64 Skycrane heavy lift helicopter
- Sikorsky S-76 utility helicopter
- Sikorsky S-92 helibus airliner and utility helicopter

=== Sino Swearingen ===
- Sino Swearingen SJ30-2 Light corporate jet

=== SIPA (Société Industrielle Pour l'Aéronautique) ===
- SIPA S.50
- SIPA S.70 twin-engine airliner
- SIPA S.90 two-seat touring monoplane
- SIPA S.200 Minijet two-seat light jet
- SIPA Antilope 4 or 5-seat turboprop cabin touring monoplane
- SIPA Anjou four-seat twin-engine cabin utility monoplane
- SIPA Coccinelle two-seat civil utility monoplane

=== Skandinavisk Aero Industri (SAI) ===
- SAI KZ Isingle-seat low-wing sport monoplane
- SAI KZ II two-seat low-wing sport monoplane
- SAI KZ IIItwo-seat high-wing utility monoplane
- SAI KZ IV twin-engine light transport and flying ambulance
- SAI KZ VII Lærke four-seat high-wing utility cabin monoplane
- SAI KZ VIII single-seat low-wing aerobatic monoplane

=== Slick Aircraft Company ===
- Slick Aircraft Slick 360 single-seat aerobatics aircraft

=== Sling Aircraft ===
- Sling Aircraft Sling 2 two-seat light sport aircraft
- Sling Aircraft Sling 4 four-seat light sport aircraft

=== Slingsby ===
- Slingsby T-67 Firefly two-seat basic trainer

=== SNCAC/Aérocentre (Société Nationale de Constructions Aéronautiques du Centre) ===
- SNCAC NC.700 Martinet Siebel Si 204 twin-engine transport
- SNCAC NC.840 Chardonneret four-seat cabin monoplane
- SNCAC NC.850 Norvigie two or four-seat cabin monoplane
- SNCAC NC.860 twin-engine four-seat cabin monoplane

=== SNCAN/Nord (Société Nationale de Constructions Aéronautiques du Nord) ===
- Nord N 262 turboprop airliner
- Nord 1200 Norécrin 2-4-seat cabin monoplane
- Nord 1300 Grunau Baby training glider
- Nord-2000 DFS Olympia Meise sailplane
- Nord Noratlas twin-engine cargo transport

=== SNCASE/Sud-Est (Société Nationale de Constructions Aéronautiques du Sud Est) ===
- SNCASE SE-161 Languedoc four-engine airliner
- SNCASE SE-200 Amphitrite six-engine flying boat airliner
- SNCASE SE-210 Caravelle twin jet airliner
- SNCASE SE-2010 Armagnac four-engine airliner
- SNCASE SE-2100 tailless pusher touring monoplane
- SNCASE SE-2300 small touring cabin monoplane
- SNCASE SE-3130 Alouette II utility helicopter
- SNCASE SE-3160 Alouette III utility helicopter

=== SNCASO/Sud-Ouest (Société Nationale de Constructions Aéronautiques du Sud-Ouest) ===
- SNCASO SO.30 Bretagne twin-engine airliner
- SNCASO SO.80 Biarritz, SO.90 Cassiopée, SO.93 Corse, S.O.94 Corse II twin-engine airliner and mailplane
- SNCASO SO.3050 two-seat cabin monoplane
- SNCASO SO.7010 Pégase single-engine utility /executive transport
- SNCASO SO.7060 Deauville light cabin monoplane

=== Snow ===
- Snow S-1 and S-2 crop dusters

=== SOCATA ===
(for earlier types see Morane-Saulnier)

- SOCATA GY-80 Horizon four-seat low-wing monoplane light aircraft
- SOCATA ST 10 Diplomate four-seat low-wing monoplane light aircraft
- SOCATA Rallye two/four-seat light aircraft
- SOCATA TB Tampico, Tobago and Trinidad four/five-seat light aircraft
- SOCATA TBM single-engine corporate turboprop

=== Sonaca ===
- Sonaca 200 two-seat low-wing monoplane

=== Sopwith ===
- Sopwith Antelope three-seat airliner & transport
- Sopwith Atlantic transatlantic record aircraft
- Sopwith DM (Daily Mail) Tractor Biplane single-engine racing floatplane biplane
- Sopwith Dove two-seat sport biplane
- Sopwith Gnu single-engine three-seat touring biplane
- Sopwith Grasshopper two-seat open-cockpit touring biplane
- Sopwith Rainbow racing floatplane biplane
- Sopwith Schneider racing biplane
- Sopwith Swallow parasol monoplane racer and utility aircraft
- Sopwith Tabloid single-engine racing floatplane biplane
- Sopwith Wallaby single-engine biplane airliner

=== SPCA (Société Provençale de Construction Aéronautique) ===
- SPCA Météore 63 biplane airliner flying boat
- SPCA VII/40T/41T/218 trimotor high-wing monoplane mailplane
- SPCA 60T twin-engine passenger flying boat
- SPCA 90/91T high-wing trimotor monoplane passenger and cargo transport

=== Spectrum ===
- Spectrum Beaver one or two-seat pusher ultralight

=== Spartan Aircraft Company(US) ===
- Spartan C2 two-seat light sport low-wing monoplane
- Spartan C3 three-seat open-cockpit biplane
- Spartan C4 single-engine high-wing cabin monoplane
- Spartan C5 single-engine high-wing cabin monoplane
- Spartan Executive single-engine luxury business monoplane

=== Spartan Aircraft (UK) ===
- Simmonds Spartan two-seat single-engine open-cockpit biplane
- Spartan Arrow two-seat single-engine open-cockpit biplane
- Spartan Clipper single-engine two-seat cabin touring monoplane
- Spartan Cruiser trimotor monoplane airliner
- Spartan Three Seater single-engine open-cockpit biplane

=== St-Just ===
- St-Just Cyclone improved homebuilt variant of the Cessna 180
- St-Just Super-Cyclone improved homebuilt variant of the Cessna 180

=== St. Louis ===
- St. Louis C2 Cardinal, Senior Cardinal & Super Cardinal two-seat high-wing cabin monoplane

=== Stampe et Vertongen ===
- Stampe et Vertongen RSV.26/100, RSV.18/100, RSV.26/18, and SV.18 open-cockpit two-seat touring biplanes
- Stampe et Vertongen RSV.32 open-cockpit two-seat training biplane
- Stampe SV.4 open-cockpit two-seat aerobatics and training biplane

=== Standard ===
- Standard J-1 utility/barnstorming biplane
- Standard JR biplane mailplane

=== Star ===
- Star Cavalier two-seat cabin monoplane

=== Starck ===
- Starck AS-27 Starcky single-seat racing biplane
- Starck AS-37 homebuilt two-seat biplane
- Starck AS-57 two-seat low-wing monoplane sportsplane
- Starck AS-70 Jac two-seat low-wing monoplane homebuilt
- Starck AS-80 Holiday two-seat high wing monoplane kitplane
- Starck AS.90 New Look mid-wing sportplane

=== Stearman Aircraft ===
(absorbed by Boeing)

- Stearman LT-1 single-engine biplane passenger and mail transport
- Stearman M-2 Speedmail single-engine biplane single-engine mailplane
- Stearman C2 single-engine utility/mail biplane
- Stearman C3 single-engine utility/mail biplane
- Stearman 4 Junior Speedmail single-engine utility/mailplane biplane
- Stearman 4 Speedmail biplane single-engine utility/mailplane
- Stearman 4 Senior Speedmail single-engine utility/mailplane biplane
- Stearman 6 Cloudboy two-seat training and sport biplane
- Stearman CAB-1 Coach single-engine cabin biplane passenger transport

=== Stemme ===
- Stemme S6 and S8 two-seat touring motorglider
- Stemme S10 self-launching sailplane
- Stemme S12 two-seat touring motorglider

=== Stinson ===
- Stinson SB-1 Detroiter single-engine cabin airliner biplane
- Stinson SM Detroiter single-engine cabin airliner monoplane
- Stinson Junior single-engine cabin monoplane airliner
- Stinson SR Reliant single-engine high-wing cabin monoplane
- Stinson Model O single-engine open-cockpit two-seat monoplane
- Stinson SM-6000 Airliner high-wing monoplane trimotor airliner
- Stinson Model T high-wing monoplane trimotor airliner
- Stinson Model U high-wing monoplane trimotor airliner
- Stinson Model A low-wing monoplane trimotor airliner
- Stinson Voyager single-engine sportsplane
- Stinson 108 single-engine sportsplane

=== Stits ===
- Stits DS-1 Baby Bird monoplane designed to be world's smallest aircraft
- Stits SA-2A Sky Baby biplane designed to be world's smallest aircraft
- Stits SA-3A Playboy single-seat low-wing homebuilt monoplane
- Stits SA-4A Executive three-seat low wig homebuilt monoplane
- Stits SA-5 Flut-R-Bug mid-wing homebuilt monoplane
- Stits SA-7 Sky-Coupe two-seat high-wing homebuilt monoplane
- Stits SA-8 Skeeto single-seat parasol-wing ultralight
- Stits SA-11A Playmate two-seat low-wing monoplane

=== Sukhoi ===
- Sukhoi Su-26 aerobatic aircraft
- Sukhoi Su-29 two-seat aerobatic aircraft
- Sukhoi Su-31 single-seat aerobatic aircraft
- Sukhoi Su-80 twin-turboprop STOL aircraft
- Sukhoi Superjet 100 twin-jet medium-range airliner

=== Supermarine ===
- Supermarine Air Yacht trimotor flying boat
- Supermarine Channel open-cockpit flying boat passenger biplane
- Supermarine Sea Eagle amphibious biplane flying boat airliner
- Supermarine Southampton flying boat, several used as airliners
- Supermarine Sparrow two-seat ultralight
- Supermarine Stranraer twin-engine flying boat airliner and utility transport
- Supermarine Swan twin-engine biplane flying boat airliner
- Supermarine Walrus single-engine amphibious biplane used as whaling spotter and utility transport

=== Swallow ===
- Swallow TP open-cockpit biplane sport/trainer

=== Swearingen ===
- Swearingen Merlin twin-turboprop feederliner/executive transport
- Swearingen Metro twin-turboprop feederliner
- Swearingen SA-30/Swearingen-Jaffe SJ30 executive transport
- Swearingen SX-300 two-seat cabin homebuilt

== T ==
=== Tachikawa ===
- Tachikawa Ki-54 twin-engine airliner

=== Tairov ===
- Tairov OKO-1 single-engine monoplane airline

=== Tatra ===
- Tatra T.101 two-seat sports and record monoplane

=== Taylorcraft ===
- Taylor Cub two-seat parasol monoplane
- Taylor J-2 two-seat high-wing cabin monoplane
- Taylorcraft A two-seat high-wing cabin monoplane
- Taylorcraft B two-seat cabin monoplane
- Taylorcraft D two-seat cabin monoplane
- Taylorcraft 20 Ranch Wagon, Zephyr 400, Topper and Seabird four-seat cabin monoplane
- Taylorcraft F-21 two-seat cabin monoplane

=== Technoavia ===
- Technoavia SM92 Finist STOL utility transport
- Technoavia Rysachok Twin engine light utility aircraft

=== Tecnam ===
- Tecnam P92 two-seat single-engine lightplane
- Tecnam P2006T four-seat light twin
- Tecnam P2012 Traveller light utility twin

=== Temco ===
- Tempco Swift low-wing two-seat enclosed monoplane

=== The Airplane Factory ===
- The Airplane Factory Sling 2 two-seat light sport aircraft

=== Thruxton ===
- Thruxton Jackaroo four-seat passenger biplane modified from de Havilland Tiger Moth

=== Thurston ===
- Thurston Teal two-seat amphibian

=== Tipsy/Avions Fairey ===
- Avions Fairey Tipsy B two-seat open-cockpit monoplane
- Tipsy Nipper aerobatic single-seat monoplane
- Avions Fairey Tipsy S & S.2 single-seat monoplanes
- Avions Fairey Junior single-seat open-cockpit monoplane
- Avions Fairey Belfair two-seat cabin monoplane
- Avions Fairey Tipsy M/Fairey Primer monoplane basic trainer

=== Tokyo Koku ===
- Tokyo Koku Aiba-Tsubame three-seat airliner

=== Toyota ===
- Toyota TA-1 prototype single-engine, 4-place aircraft

=== Transavia ===
- Transavia Airtruk sesquiplane top dresser
- Transavia Skyfarmer sesquiplane top dresser

=== Travel Air ===
- Travel Air 1000 three-seat open-cockpit utility biplane
- Travel Air 2000, 3000 and 4000 three-seat open-cockpit utility biplanes
- Travel Air 5000 single-engine monoplane airliner
- Travel Air 6000 single-engine monoplane airliner
- Travel Air 4 three-seat open-cockpit utility biplanes
- Travel Air 6B single-engine monoplane airliner
- Travel Air 10 single-engine monoplane airliner
- Travel Air 11 three-seat open-cockpit utility biplane
- Travel Air 12 open-cockpit utility biplane
- Travel Air 14 open-cockpit utility biplane

=== Tupolev ===
- Tupolev ANT-3/PS-3 single-engine sesquiplane mailplane
- Tupolev ANT-4/G-1 twin-engine transport monoplane
- Tupolev ANT-7/PS-7 twin-engine transport monoplane
- Tupolev ANT-9 trimotor monoplane airliner
- Tupolev ANT-14 four-engine monoplane airliner
- Tupolev ANT-20 "Maxim Gorky" largest landplane of the 1930s
- Tupolev ANT-35/PS-35 twin-engine monoplane airliner
- Tupolev Tu-104 twin-jet medium-range airliner
- Tupolev Tu-110 four-jet airliner
- Tupolev Tu-114 four-turboprop long-range airliner
- Tupolev Tu-116 four-turboprop long-range airliner
- Tupolev Tu-124 twin jet short-range airliner
- Tupolev Tu-134 twin-jet short-range airliner
- Tupolev Tu-144 supersonic airliner
- Tupolev Tu-154 medium-range airliner
- Tupolev Tu-204 and 214 twin jet long-range airliner
- Tupolev Tu-334 abandoned airliner

== U ==
=== Udet ===
- Udet U 7 Kolibri single-seat parasol monoplane
- Udet U 8 Limousine three-seat single-engine monoplane airliner
- Udet U 11 Kondor four-engined monoplane airliner
- Udet U 12 Flamingo two-seat aerobatic and training biplane

== V ==
=== Van's ===
- Van's RV-3 single-seat low-wing monoplane homebuilt
- Van's RV-4 tandem two-seat low-wing monoplane homebuilt
- Van's RV-6 two-seat side by side low-wing monoplane homebuilt
- Van's RV-7 two-seat side by side low-wing monoplane homebuilt
- Van's RV-8 tandem two-seat low-wing monoplane homebuilt
- Van's RV-9 two-seat side by side low-wing nosewheel monoplane homebuilt
- Van's RV-10 four-seat low-wing homebuilt
- Van's RV-12 two-seat side by side low-wing nosewheel monoplane homebuilt
- Van's RV-14 two-seat side by side low-wing nosewheel monoplane homebuilt

=== VEB Flugzeugwerke Dresden ===
- Baade B-152 passenger jet airliner

=== Verville ===
- Verville Air Coach single-engine cabin monoplane airliner

=== VFW-Fokker ===
- VFW-Fokker 614 twin-engined jet feederliner

=== Vickers-Armstrongs ===
- Vickers Type 170 Vanguard twin-engine biplane airliner
- Vickers Vanguard turboprop airliner
- Vickers VC.1 Viking twin-engine airliner
- Vickers VC10 jet airliner
- Vickers Vellore single-engine cargo biplane
- Vickers Vellox twin engine biplane airliner
- Vickers Viastra trimotor monoplane airliner
- Vickers Viking single-engine flying boat
- Vickers Vimy Commercial twin-engine biplane airliner
- Vickers Vulcan single-engine biplane airliner
- Vickers Viscount turboprop airliner and freighter

=== Victa ===
- Victa Aircruiser four-seat light aircraft
- Victa Airtourer two-seat light aircraft

=== VisionAire ===
- VisionAire Vantage single-engine corporate jet

=== Voisin ===
- Voisin 1907 biplane biplane sportsplane
- Voisin Canard biplane pusher canard sportsplane

=== Volmer ===
- Volmer Sport
- Volmer VJ-21 Jaybird
- Volmer VJ-22 Sportsman homebuilt two-seat homebuilt amphibian
- Volmer VJ-24W SunFun pod and boom motor-glider ultralight

=== Vulcanair ===
- Vulcanair SF.600 Canguro twin-engine feederliner
- Vulcanair VF600W Mission single-engine turboprop utility transport

=== Vultee ===
- Vultee V-1 single-engine monoplane airliner

== W ==
=== Weaver Aircraft Co and Waco ===
- Waco 4 open cockpit biplane
- Waco 5 three-seat open biplane
- Waco 6 three-seat open biplane
- Waco 7 three-seat open biplane
- Waco 9 open-cockpit three-seat sports biplane
- Waco 10, GXE, ASO, ATO and similar open-cockpit three-seat sports biplane
- Waco JYM and JWM Mailplanes open-cockpit single-seat mail biplanes
- Waco KBA, IBA, PBA, RBA and UBA two-seat sports biplanes
- Waco PLA and ULA Sportsman two-seat sports biplanes
- Waco INF, KNF, and RNF open-cockpit three-seat sports biplane
- Waco PCF and QCF open-cockpit three-seat sports biplane
- Waco UBF open-cockpit three-seat sports biplane
- Waco UMF and YMF open-cockpit three-seat sports biplane
- Waco YPF-6, YPF-7, ZPF-6, ZPF-7 and UPF-7 open-cockpit three-seat sports biplane
- Waco ODC, PDC and QDC cabin touring biplanes
- Waco BEC, OEC and UEC cabin touring biplanes
- Waco UIC cabin touring biplanes
- Waco CJC and DJC cabin touring biplanes
- Waco UKC and YKC cabin touring biplanes
- Waco CJC-S and DJC-S cabin touring biplanes
- Waco UKC-S, YKC-S and ZKC-S cabin touring biplanes
- Waco UKS-6, VKS-7, YKS-6, ZKS-6, ZKS-7 and HKS-7 cabin touring biplanes
- Waco YOC & UOC cabin touring biplanes
- Waco CUC cabin touring biplanes
- Waco AQC-6, DQC-6, EQC-6, VQC-6, YQC-6 and ZQC-6 cabin touring biplanes
- Waco AGC-8, DGC-7, EGC-7, EGC-8, MGC-8, ZGC-7 and ZGC-8 cabin touring biplanes
- Waco AVN & ZVN nosewheel cabin touring biplanes
- Waco ARE, HRE & SRE cabin touring biplanes
- Waco W Aristocraft pusher cabin monoplane

=== Wassmer ===
- Wassmer Javelot I, II and Super Javelot competition sailplanes
- Wassmer Squale, Squale Marfa and Espadon competition sailplanes
- Wassmer Bijave two-seat training glider
- Wassmer WA-40 Super IV Sancy, WA-41 Baladou and WA-4/21 Prestige 5-seat single-engine cabin monoplanes
- Wassmer WA-50, 51 Pacific, 52 Europa, 53 and 54 Atlantic 5-seat single-engine cabin monoplanes
- Wassmer WA-80 Piranha monoplane cabin lightplane
- Wassmer D.120 Paris-Nice monoplane cabin lightplane

=== Weatherly ===
- Weatherly 201 low-wing monoplane crop duster
- Weatherly 620 low-wing monoplane crop duster

=== Wedell-Williams ===
- Wedell-Williams Model 22, McRobertson racer and We-Will Jr. racing monoplanes
- Wedell-Williams Model 44, We-Will, We-Winc & 44 Special racing monoplanes
- Wedell-Williams Model 45 racing monoplane

=== Werkspoor ===
- Werkspoor Jumbo single-engine biplane freighter

=== Westland ===
- Westland Dragonfly small utility helicopter
- Westland Gazelle utility helicopter
- Westland Limousine I, II & III single-engine airliners
- Westland Wessex utility helicopter
- Westland Wessex and IV trimotor airliners
- Westland Whirlwind helicopter
- Westland Widgeon two-seat single-engine ultralight monoplane
- Westland Widgeon utility helicopter
- Westland Woodpigeon two-seat single-engine ultralight biplane

=== Wibault ===
- Wibault 240 single-engine airliner floatplane
- Wibault 280 trimotor monoplane airliner
- Wibault 360 single-engine monoplane airliner

=== Widerøe ===
- Widerøe/Honningstad C.5 Polar single-engine utility cabin monoplane

== X ==
=== Xi'an ===
- Xian MA60 twin-turboprop regional aircraft
- Xian MA600 twin-turboprop regional aircraft
- Xian MA700 twin-turboprop regional aircraft under development
- Xian Y-7 twin-turboprop transport/passenger aircraft

== Y ==
=== Yakovlev ===
- Yakovlev AIR-1 and 2 two-seat sport and training biplane
- Yakovlev AIR-3, 4 and 8 two-seat parasol monoplane
- Yakovlev AIR-5 single-engine high-wing cabin monoplane
- Yakovlev AIR-6 single-engine high-wing cabin utility monoplane
- Yakovlev AIR-7 low-wing racing monoplane
- Yakovlev AIR-9 two-seat low-wing touring monoplane
- Yakovlev AIR-11 single-engine low-wing touring monoplane
- Yakovlev AIR-12 low-wing racing monoplane
- Yakovlev UT-1 single-seat aerobatic and training aircraft
- Yakovlev UT-2 two-seat aerobatic and training aircraft
- Yakovlev Yak-12 multirole four-seat high-wing cabin monoplane
- Yakovlev Yak-18T four-seat light aircraft
- Yakovlev Yak-40 trijet regional jet airliner
- Yakovlev Yak-42 short-range airliner
- Yakovlev Yak-50 single-seat aerobatic monoplane
- Yakovlev Yak-52 two-seat training aircraft
- Yakovlev Yak-54 single-seat aerobatic monoplane
- Yakovlev Yak-55 single-seat aerobatic monoplane
- Yakovlev Yak-58 pusher monoplane
- Yakovlev Yak-112 light utility monoplane

=== Yeoman ===
- Yeoman Cropmaster low-wing monoplane cropduster

== Z ==
=== Zeppelin ===
- Zeppelin-Staaken E-4/20 four-engine monoplane airliner

=== Zivko ===
- Zivko Edge 540 aerobatic aircraft

=== Zlin ===
- Zlín Z-26, 126, 226, and 326 Trener and Akrobat aerobatic and training monoplanes
- Zlín Z 526 Akrobat aerobatic monoplane
- Zlin Z-37 Čmelák low-wing monoplane cropduster
- Zlín Z 42, Z 142 and Z 242 monoplane light aircraft
- Zlín Z 43 and Z 143 monoplane light aircraft
- Zlín Z-50 aerobatic monoplane

=== Zenith ===
- Zenith Zodiac CH 601 light two-seat aircraft

=== Zenith ===
- Zenith Z-6 single-engine biplane airliner and mailplane
- Zenith Albatross Z-12 trimotor monoplane airliner

== See also ==
- List of aircraft
- List of most-produced aircraft
- List of ICAO aircraft type designators
- List of airliners by maximum takeoff weight
- List of Bushplanes
- List of light transport aircraft
- List of racing aircraft
- List of regional airliners
