= Piel Pinocchio =

Piel Pinocchio may refer to one of three different aircraft designs by Claude Piel:

- Piel CP-10 Pinocchio, a tandem-wing design
- Piel CP-20 Pinocchio, a sport monoplane
- Piel CP.90 Pinocchio II, a later sport monoplane
