= Hirondelle =

Hirondelle may refer to:

== Vehicles ==
- Dassault Hirondelle, a French 14-seat utility transport aircraft of the 1960s
- Hirondelle, a GWR 3031 Class steam locomotive numbered 3045 and built in January 1895
- Hirondelle (catamaran), a fibreglass cruising catamaran
- Western Hirondelle, a Canadian two-seat aircraft for cross country and recreational flying
- Cycles Hirondelle, a product line of Manufrance

== Other ==
- Hirondelle News Agency, based at the International Criminal Tribunal for Rwanda in Arusha, Tanzania
- Anne Hirondelle (born 1944), American ceramicist
- Journal d'Hirondelle, a novel by Belgian writer Amélie Nothomb
- Operation Hirondelle, a successful 1953 French raid in the First Indochina War

== See also ==
- Hirondel, a fictional car driven by Simon Templar, the protagonist of a book series by Leslie Charteris
