= Globe Trotter =

Globe Trotter or Globetrotter may refer to:

- Globetrotter, a 2000 video game
- Globetrotter, working title for the 2027 Indian film Varanasi
- Globe-Trotter, a luggage manufacturer
- Poullin JP.20 Globe Trotter, a French aircraft of the early 1950s
- Le globe-trotter, a 1956 work for piano and later orchestra by Darius Milhaud
- Globe Trotter, a 1989 album by Albert Alan Owen
- "Globe Trotter", a song by Johnny Hodges from the 1955 album Castle Rock
- "Globe Trotter", a track on the 1991 compilation album Images – The Best of Jean-Michel Jarre

== See also ==
- Harlem Globetrotters, an American exhibition basketball team
- German Globetrotter Club, a community of adventure travellers
