= Pe Ell =

Pe Ell may refer to:

- Pe Ell, Washington, a town in Washington State
- Pe Ell (Shannara), a character from the Shannara series of novels by Terry Brooks

== See also ==
- Piel (disambiguation)
