= Piel =

Piel may refer to:

== People ==
- Claude Piel, (1921–1982), French aircraft designer
- Eleanor Jackson Piel (1920-2022), American lawyer
- Gerard Piel (1915–2004), American science journalist and publisher of the new Scientific American
- Jonathan Piel, (born 1938), American science journalist and editor
- Monika Piel, (born 1951), German radio and television journalist

== Other uses ==
- Piel (TV series)
- Piel CP.500, a light aircraft designed by Claude Piel
- Piel Island, one of the Islands of Furness in northern England
  - Piel Castle, a castle on Piel Island
- "Piel", a song by Arca from Arca
- Piel, a barangay in Baliwag, Bulacan

== See also ==
- Pi'el a stem class in Biblical Hebrew and Modern Hebrew verb conjugation
