= Piel CP-20 Pinocchio =

1950s French light aircraft

CP-20 Pinocchio

General information
- Type: Single seat sports aircraft
- National origin: France
- Designer: Claude Piel
- Status: active
- Number built: 2

History
- First flight: 1 July 1951

The Piel CP-20 Pinocchio is a single engine French sport monoplane first flown in 1951. Only two were built but one was still flying over sixty years later.

== Design and development ==
Despite sharing the name Pinocchio, the CP-20 was a completely different design from Claude Piel's first aircraft, the CP-10 Pinocchio. The CP-20 is a conventional low wing cantilever monoplane whereas the CP-10 was a Pou-du-Ciel style tandem wing design; it did inherit the CP-10's rudder, wheels and firewall. The centre section of the Pinocchio's wing is rectangular in plan and the outer panels are semi-elliptical. It has broad-chord ailerons but no flaps.

The fuselage is almost flat sided and bottomed but with raised, rounded decking behind the single seat cockpit and canopy. The empennage is conventional, with tapered horizontal surfaces mounted near the top of the fuselage and a curved fin carrying a broad, balanced rudder. The rudder extends down to the keel, so the elevators are cut away to allow its movement. The Pinocchio has a wide track tail wheel/skid undercarriage with main wheels on vertical, cantilever legs from the wings.

Only two Pinocchios were built. The first had a 34 kW (45 hp) converted Volkswagen 1.1 litres (67 cu in) litre engine. The second, built by Pierre Bordini, was originally designated the CP-210 and was powered by a 34 kW (45 hp) Salmson 9 AD engine. In July 1961 it became the CP-211, with the same Salmson engine but with a one-piece sliding canopy and more raked screen, faired landing legs and a tailwheel rather than a skid, greater fuel capacity, and a cropped vertical tail. Its time as the CP-211 was brief, for at the end of 1961 it became the CP-212, fitted with a 48 kW (65 hp) Continental A-65 air-cooled flat-four engine.

== Operational history ==
In 1951 the CP-20 won the 4th RSA Cup, flown at Montargis. During the 1960s the CP-212 had several owners but its certificate expired in 1970. In the 1990s it was restored and eventually re-registered in October 2001 as the CP-215. It remained on the French civil register in 2014.

== Variants ==
Data from Massé (2004)

CP-20
First airframe, as below.
CP-210
Second airframe with 34 kW (45 hp) Salmson 9 ADb radial engine
CP-211
Second airframe, as CP-210 but with one piece, sliding canopy and cropped vertical tail.
CP-212
Second airframe, as CP-211 but with 48 kW (65 hp) Continental A65 engine.
CP-215
Second airframe restored.

== Specifications (CP-20) ==
Data from Massé (2004) pp. 21-28

General characteristics

- Crew: One
- Length: 5.60 m (18 ft 4 in)
- Wingspan: 7.30 m (23 ft 11 in)
- Height: 1.35 m (4 ft 5 in)
- Wing area: 9.5 m^{2} (102 sq ft)
- Aspect ratio: 5.9
- Empty weight: 177 kg (390 lb)
- Max takeoff weight: 270 kg (595 lb)
- Fuel capacity: 35 L (7.7 imp gal; 9.2 US gal)
- Powerplant: 1 × Volkswagen 1.1 L air-cooled flat-four, 19 kW (25 hp)
- Propellers: 2-bladed, 1.35 m (4 ft 5 in) diameter wooden, fixed pitch

Performance

- Maximum speed: 135 km/h (84 mph, 73 kn)
- Cruise speed: 120 km/h (75 mph, 65 kn)
- Stall speed: 55 km/h (34 mph, 30 kn)
- Never exceed speed: 160 km/h (99 mph, 86 kn)
- Range: 480 km (300 mi, 260 nmi)
- Endurance: 4 hr
- Service ceiling: 3,000 m (9,800 ft)
