= Rawdon Brothers Aircraft =

- Company type: Aircraft manufacturer
- Founded: 1938
- Defunct: 1978
- Headquarters: Wichita, Kansas
- Key people: Herbert Rawdon and Gene Rawdon

Rawdon Brothers Aircraft Inc was a United States aircraft manufacturer between 1938 and 1978.

== Formation and operations ==
Herb Rawdon had been the chief designer of Travel Air, and later Beech Aircraft in Wichita, Kansas. He left Beech and in 1938 established the firm, with his brother Gene Rawdon, with their factory located near the Beech aircraft plant. The firm continued in operation until 1978, when it became Spinks-Rawdon in Fort Worth, Texas.

== Aircraft ==
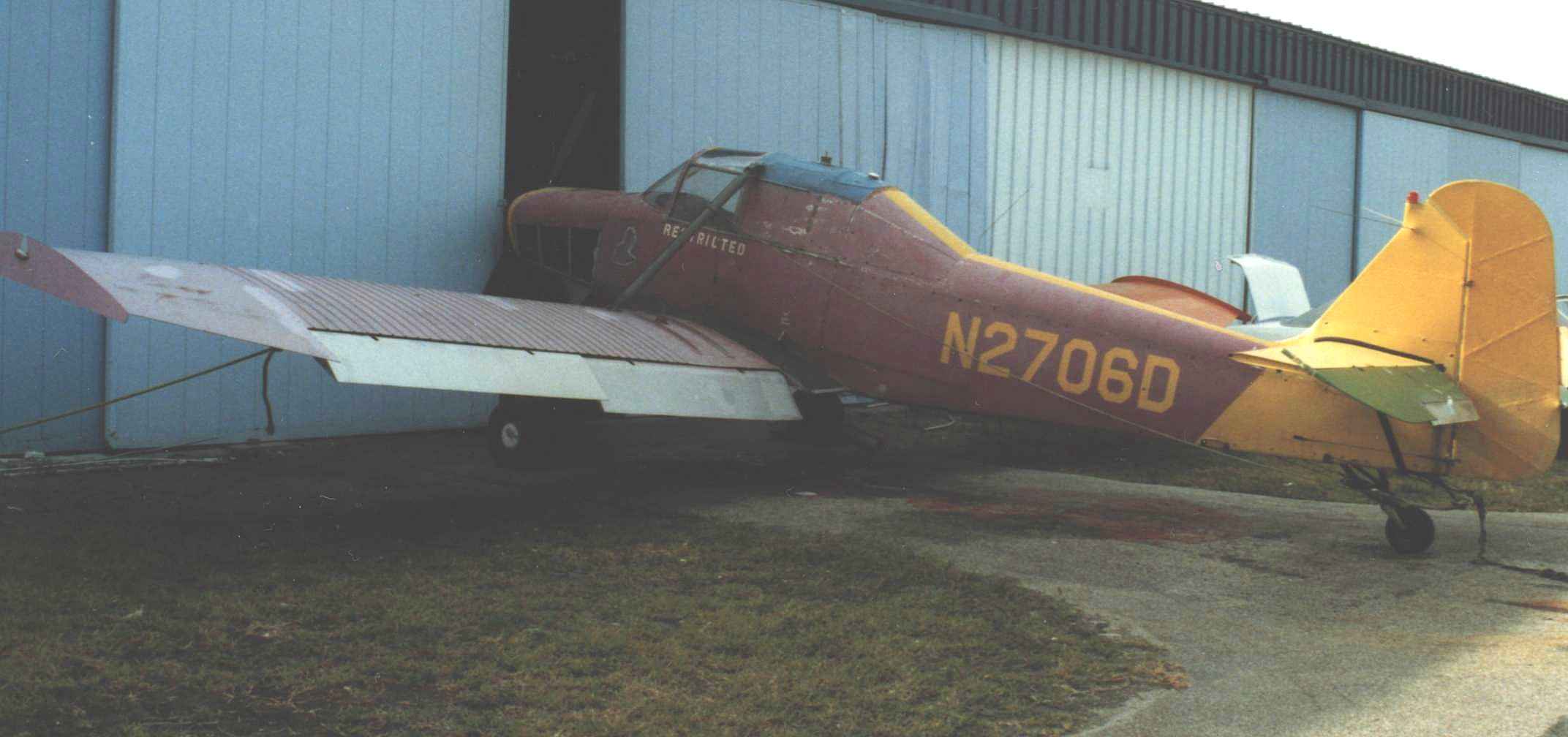
Rawdon T-1 single-seat crop-sprayer at North Perry airport, Florida, in March 1987

Rawdon R-1 was designed by Herb Rawdon in 1938 and a single example was built. It was a single-engine twin-seat side-by-side open cockpit low-wing training monoplane powered by a 75 h.p. Lycoming engine. It had a maximum speed of 110 mph and a cruising speed of 105 mph. The R-1 was not accepted as a trainer by the U.S. Army Air Corps and it was modified as a crop spraying aircraft.

Rawdon T-1 was developed in 1951 from the R-1 and 35 examples were completed before the production line was closed in the 1960s. It was a tandem-seat closed cockpit low-wing monoplane, powered by Lycoming engines of between 125 h.p and 150 h.p. The T-1 was built in five versions and was used for training, crop spraying, aerial advertising and other utility roles.
