= Piel Beryl =

1960s French light aircraft

Piel CP.70 Beryl
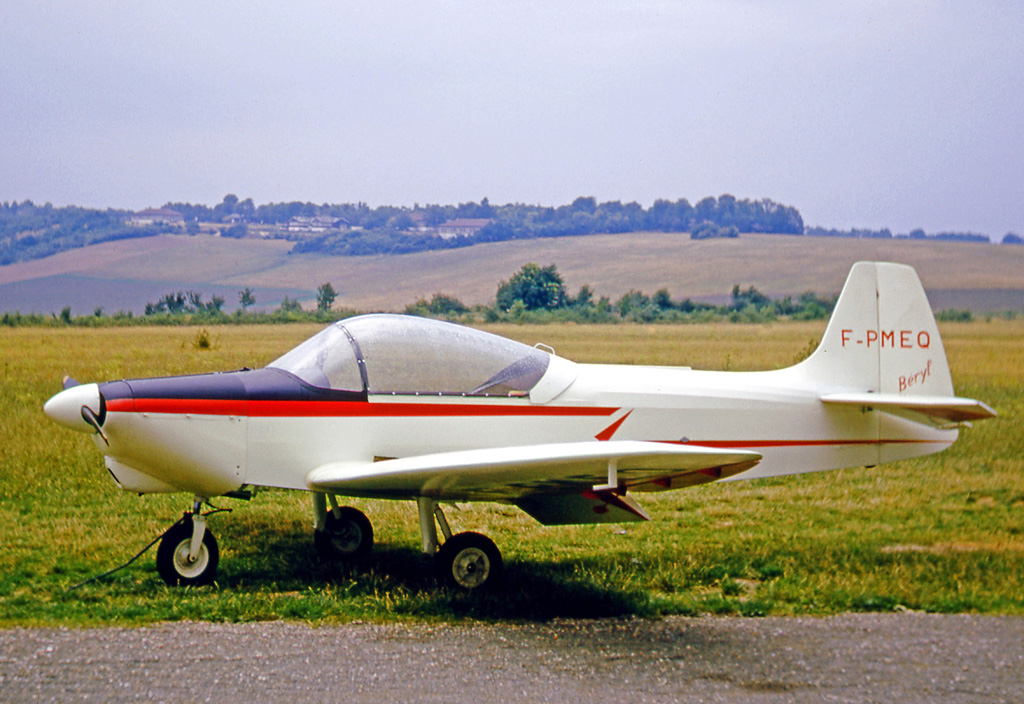
- The prototype CP.70 Beryl F-PMEQ at Beynes-Thiverval airfield near Beynes, Yvelines near Paris in August 1965

General information
- Type: Sport aircraft
- National origin: France
- Manufacturer: Homebuilt
- Designer: Claude Piel
- Status: in current operation
- Primary user: private pilot owners

History
- First flight: ca. 1965

The Piel CP.70 Beryl is a French twin-seat, single-engine sport aircraft designed by Claude Piel. It was first flown in France in the 1960s and marketed for amateur construction.

== Design and development ==
Designed by Claude Piel, the Beryl uses the same wing design as the Piel Emeraude but with a new fuselage, exchanging the Emeraude's side-by-side configuration seating for seating in tandem. As originally designed, the aircraft is fitted with fixed, tricycle undercarriage with a steerable nosewheel. Construction throughout is of doped fabric-covered wood.

An aerobatic version, designated the CP.750 was also developed. This differs from the basic CP.70 in having a reduced wingspan, fixed tailwheel undercarriage and a slightly longer fuselage. It retains the CP.70's wooden wings, but the fuselage is built of welded steel tube and still covered in fabric.

== Operational history ==
The Beryl has been homebuilt by amateur constructors and in 2009 there were still four examples active on the French civil aircraft register. The prototype F-PMEQ, completed in 1965 with tricycle undercarriage, was still active in 2014 modified as a CP.703 with tail-wheel undercarriage. Examples of the design have also been completed in Brazil and the United States.

== Variants ==
CP.70
Standard variant for homebuilding powered by a 65 hp (48 kW) Continental A65-8F or 118 hp (88 kW) Lycoming O-235 engine.

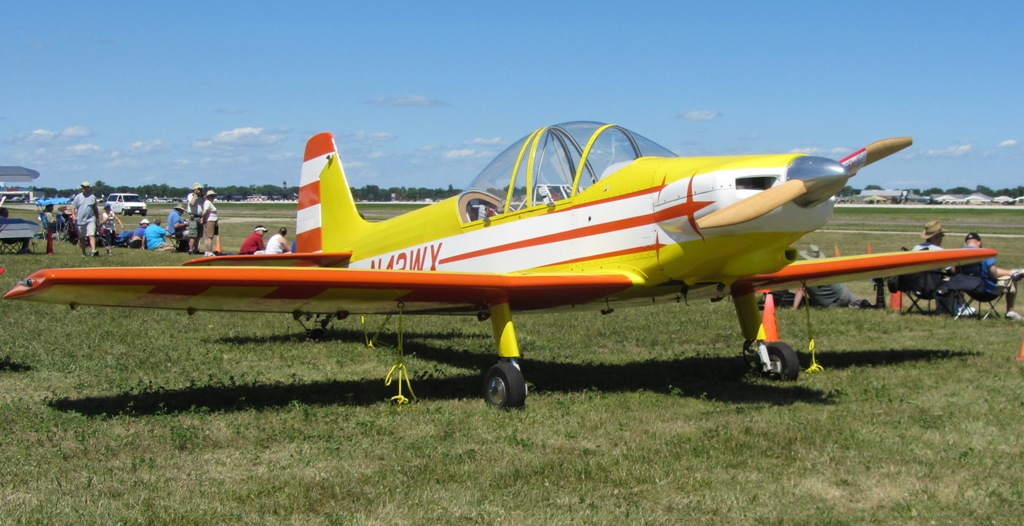
Piel Beryl CP.750

CP.750
a CP-70 with 150 hp Lycoming O-320 engine with a reduced wingspan, fixed tailwheel undercarriage, and a slightly longer fuselage.
CP.751
CP-750 with 200 hp Lycoming O-360-A2A engine.

== Specifications (CP.70) ==
Data from Jane's All the World's Aircraft 1977–78, p.496

General characteristics

- Crew: One pilot
- Capacity: 1 passenger
- Length: 6.45 m (21 ft 2 in)
- Wingspan: 8.25 m (27 ft 1 in)
- Height: 1.60 m (5 ft 3 in)
- Wing area: 10.9 m^{2} (117 sq ft)
- Empty weight: 320 kg (700 lb)
- Gross weight: 540 kg (1,190 lb)
- Powerplant: 1 × Continental A65-8F , 49 kW (65 hp)

Performance

- Maximum speed: 175 km/h (109 mph, 95 kn)
- Range: 600 km (372 mi, 323 nmi)
- Service ceiling: 3,000 m (9,850 ft)
