= Piel Pinocchio II =

Single-seat, single-engine aerobatic sport aircraft

CP.90 Pinocchio II

General information
- Type: Aerobatic sport aircraft
- National origin: France
- Manufacturer: Homebuilt
- Designer: Claude Piel

History
- First flight: 27 August 1986

The Piel CP.90 Pinocchio II was a single-seat, single-engine aerobatic sport aircraft developed in France and marketed for homebuilding. The design was based on that of Piel's Emeraude and was unrelated to Piel's first design named Pinocchio, the CP.10 and indirectly to the second, the CP.20. It was a cantilever, low-wing monoplane of conventional design with an enclosed cockpit and fixed, tailwheel undercarriage. Construction was of wood throughout.

Although Piel commenced work on the design in 1965, the first example did not fly until 1986.

== Specifications ==
Data from Jane's All the World's Aircraft 1977–78, p.496–97

General characteristics

- Crew: One pilot
- Length: 6.00 m (19 ft 8 in)
- Wingspan: 7.20 m (23 ft 8 in)
- Height: 1.80 m (5 ft 11 in)
- Wing area: 9.7 m^{2} (104 sq ft)
- Empty weight: 335 kg (738 lb)
- Gross weight: 460 kg (1,010 lb)
- Powerplant: 1 × Continental O-200 , 75 kW (100 hp)

Performance

- Maximum speed: 260 km/h (160 mph, 140 kn)
- Range: 550 km (340 mi, 300 nmi)
- Service ceiling: 6,000 m (19,700 ft)
- Rate of climb: 8.0 m/s (1,600 ft/min)
