= Rawdon T-1 =

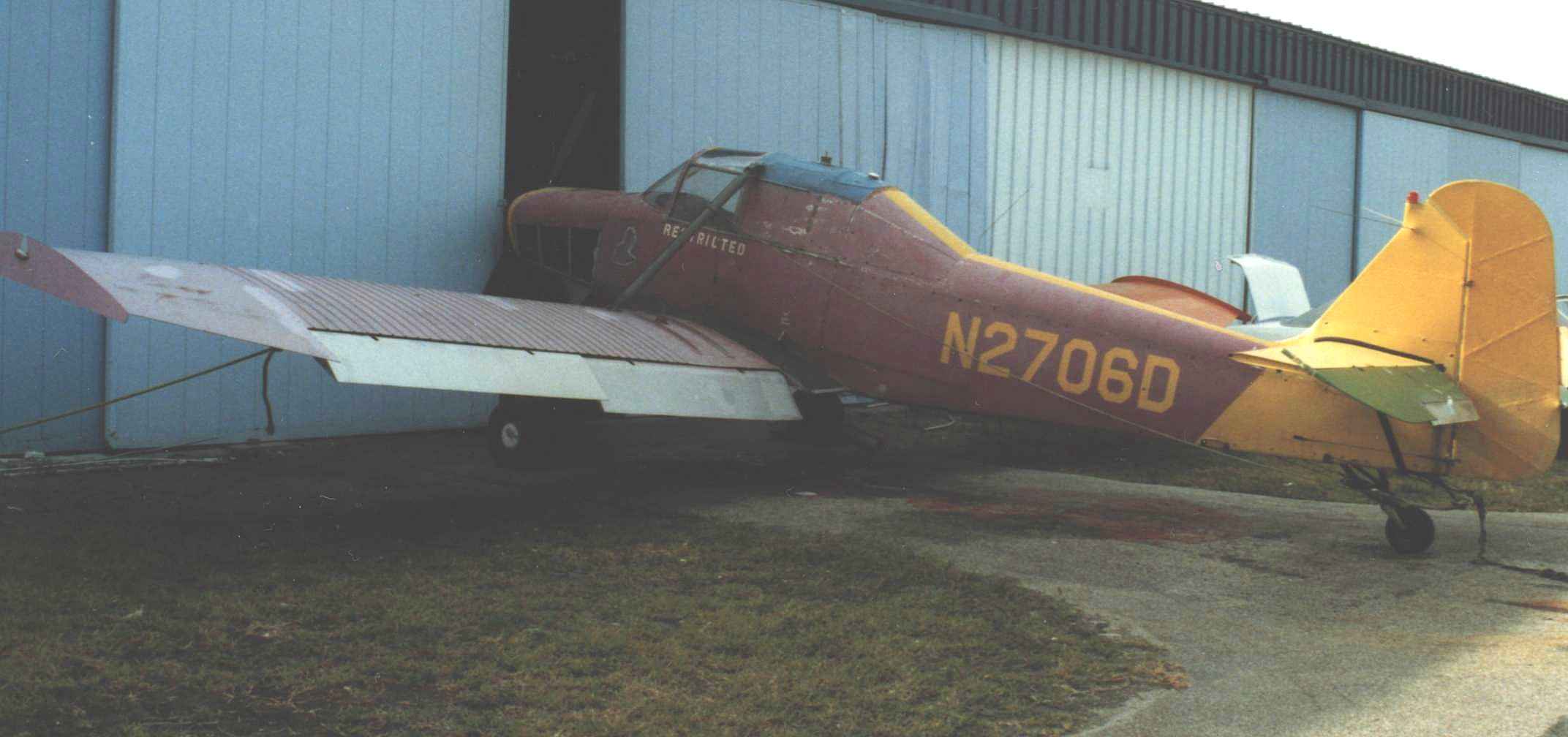
- Rawdon T-1 at North Perry airport, Florida, in March 1987

General information
- Type: utility and crop-spraying
- National origin: United States
- Manufacturer: Rawdon Brothers Aircraft Inc
- Designer: Herb Rawdon
- Primary user: crop spraying contractors
- Number built: 36

History
- Introduction date: 1951
- First flight: 1947
- Developed from: Rawdon R-1

The Rawdon T-1 was a United States light single-engined civil utility aircraft of the 1950s.

== Development ==
Herb Rawdon had been chief engineer of Travel Air, and later Beech Aircraft in Wichita, Kansas. He left Beech and with his brother Gene, established the Rawdon Brothers Aircraft firm.

In 1938 they designed a low-wing two-seat trainer, the Rawdon R-1. A single example was constructed, but was not ordered, as hoped, by the Civil Pilot Training Programme. Postwar, the firm developed and built a similar, but higher-powered model, the T-1.

== Operational history ==
Rawdon built 35 Model T-1s in five variants. The major commercial use of the aircraft was as a trainer and in crop spraying, but it also found other utility uses such as aerial banner towing for advertising purposes. Four examples of the T-1M military version were delivered to the Colombian Air Force. Many aircraft were re-fitted with more powerful engines including the Lycoming O-320 series of 150 h.p.

== On display ==
A 1949 Rawdon T-1 is owned by the Kansas Aviation Museum collection.

== Variants ==
T-1
Initial trainer version powered by a Lycoming O-290-C2 engine of 125 h.p. (13 built);
T-1CS
Crop-spraying version of the T-1 with belly tank and spray equipment buried in the wing structure (2 built);
T-1M
Military version delivered to the Colombian Air Force (4 built);
T-1S
Crop spraying model similar to the T-1CS (9 built);
T-1SD
single-seat crop sprayer with chemical hopper in place of the rear seat, squared-off wingtips with endplates and modified vertical tail. (7 built).

== Specifications (T-1SD) ==
Data from Green, 1965, p. 290

General characteristics

- Crew: 1
- Capacity: 1 passenger/trainee
- Length: 24 ft 2 in (7.37 m)
- Wingspan: 33 ft 4 in (10.16 m)
- Height: 7 ft 3 in (2.21 m)
- Wing area: 166 sq ft (15.4 m^{2})
- Empty weight: 1,300 lb (590 kg)
- Gross weight: 1,900 lb (862 kg)
- Powerplant: 1 × Lycoming O-320 four-cylinder air-cooled , 150 hp (110 kW)

Performance

- Maximum speed: 138 mph (222 km/h, 120 kn)
- Cruise speed: 120 mph (190 km/h, 100 kn)
- Range: 500 mi (800 km, 430 nmi)
- Service ceiling: 18,000 ft (5,500 m)
- Rate of climb: 900 ft/min (4.6 m/s)
