= Piel Zephir =

1970s French light aircraft

CP.80
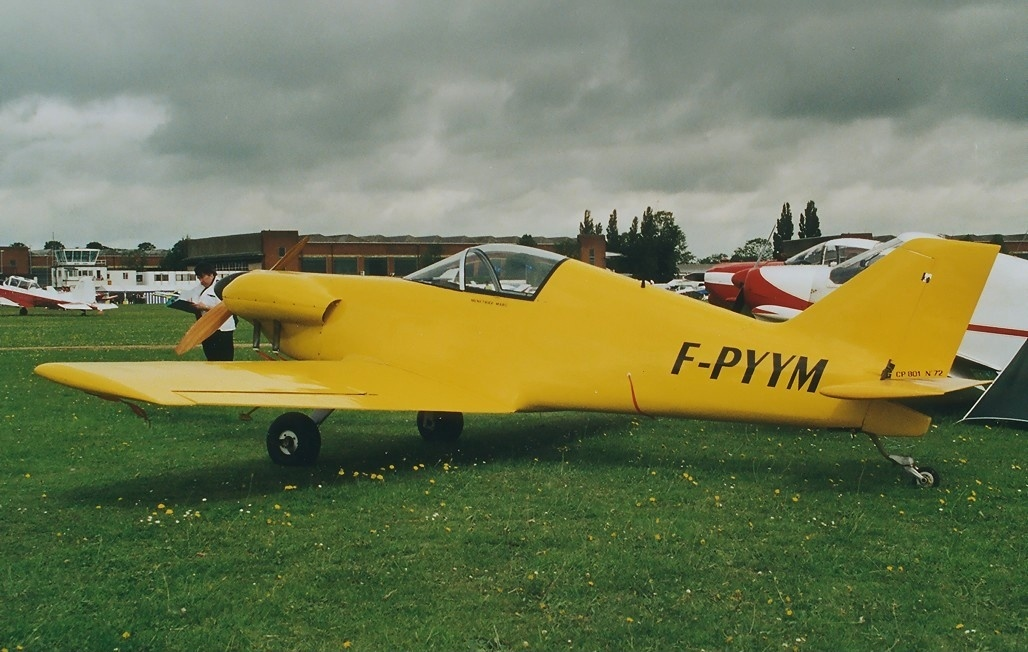
- A CP.801

General information
- Type: Racing aircraft
- National origin: France
- Manufacturer: homebuilt
- Designer: Claude Piel

History
- First flight: ca. 1974

The Piel CP.80 Zephir (or Zef), Piel CP.801 and Piel CP.802 are racing aircraft developed in France in the 1970s and marketed for homebuilding. They are compact, single-seat, single-engine monoplanes with low, cantilever wings.

== Design and development ==
The pilot sits in a fully enclosed cockpit and the tailwheel undercarriage is fixed. Although designed to be built of wood, the first CP.80 to fly (registered F-PTXL and named Zef) was built from composite materials by Pierre Calvel and beat even the designer's own CP.80 into the air. Calvel's CP-80 was entered in the French Formula One air races in 1976, but failed to qualify.

== Variants ==
Piel CP.80
Single seat racer, typically powered by a 100 hp (75 kW) Continental O-200 for Formula One Air Racing.
Piel CP.801
Piel CP.802

== Specifications (CP.80) ==
Data from

General characteristics

- Crew: 1
- Length: 5.3 m (17 ft 5 in)
- Wingspan: 6 m (19 ft 8 in)
- Height: 1.7 m (5 ft 7 in)
- Wing area: 6.2 m^{2} (67 sq ft)
- Aspect ratio: 5.8
- Airfoil: NACA 23012
- Empty weight: 260 kg (573 lb)
- Max takeoff weight: 380 kg (838 lb)
- Fuel capacity: 40 L (11 US gal; 8.8 imp gal)
- Powerplant: 1 × Continental C90-8F 4-cyl air-cooled horizontally-opposed piston engine, 67 kW (90 hp)
- Propellers: 2-bladed wooden fixed pitch propeller, 1.52 m (5 ft 0 in) diameter

Performance

- Maximum speed: 310 km/h (190 mph, 170 kn)
- Cruise speed: 240 km/h (150 mph, 130 kn) at 60% power at 1,200 m (3,900 ft)
- Stall speed: 95 km/h (59 mph, 51 kn)
- Never exceed speed: 380 km/h (240 mph, 210 kn)
- Range: 450 km (280 mi, 240 nmi) at 60% power
- Service ceiling: 6,000 m (20,000 ft)
- Rate of climb: 12 m/s (2,400 ft/min)
- Wing loading: 61.2 kg/m^{2} (12.5 lb/sq ft)
- Power/mass: 0.177 kW/kg (0.107 hp/lb
