= Hirondelle (catamaran) =

Class of fibreglass cruising catamaran

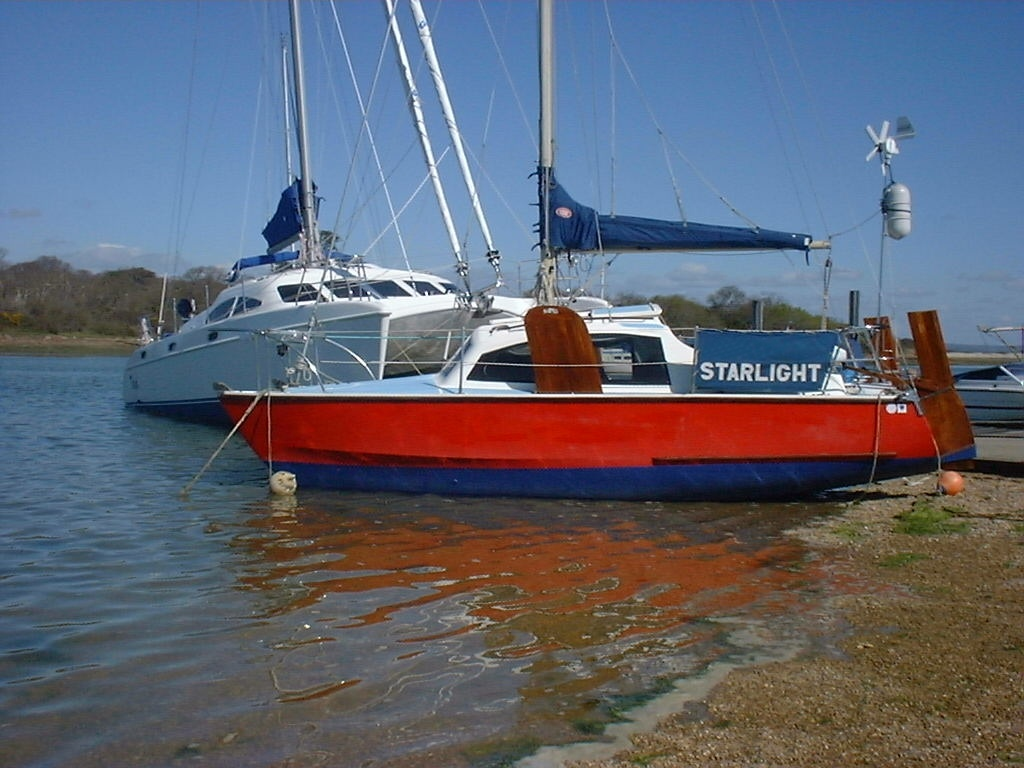
MK I Hirondelle No. 39 "Starlight"

The Hirondelle is a fibreglass cruising catamaran, 23 feet (7.0 m) in length, with a beam of 10 feet (3.0 m), and in its standard configuration has 4 or 5 berths. Based on Chris Hammond's 20 ft (6.1 m) 'Meon' cold-moulded/sheet-plywood catamaran of 1967–8, the original design was bought by Brian Carvill in 1969, modified, renamed Hirondelle, and manufactured in fibreglass by Robert Ives Boatbuilders in Christchurch, England.

The boat was marketed as a family weekender with full length sleeping berths for five adults, cooking facilities and a small but useful separate heads (toilet). Hirondelles have an outboard motor as auxiliary power, mounted in a well in the centre of the cockpit. The sailing performance of the Hirondelle was excellent in its day, and is still good for a boat of its size, particularly in Mk I form. Over 300 Hirondelles were sold.

There are four types:

Hirondelle Mk I - In general the Mk I's had a tall rig, with a mast in excess of 30 feet (9.1 m), and a high percentage of the boats were home completed. The interior layout usually comprises two generous single quarter berths, a large convertible double (cum table) on the bridgedeck and a single berth forward on the starboard side. To port in the bow is the heads - most boats were fitted with sea toilets and a small stowaway wash basin. The Mk I boat has twin daggerboards and lifting rudders, and the sail area was 250 sq ft (23 m^{2}) or 330sq ft with the widely used 150% genoa.

Hirondelle Mk II - The important difference between the Hirondelle Mk I and the Mk II was in the rig, with the Mk2 mast being a little under a metre shorter. Some minor interior changes appeared, and the cabin windows became slightly larger with a different shape. In the main the design remained as a safe comfortable family cruiser, with longer distance capability.

Hirondelle Mk III - The major change in the Hirondelle Mk III was the introduction of fixed keels and rudders in place of daggerboards and lifting rudders. Although a greater draught made for less ability to ditch crawl the boat gained in strength and many believe it to be much stiffer under sail. More space was also a good point, and a hinged full size chart table was possible, as was a better galley layout. Water tanks could also be sited in the keels.

Hirondelle Family - The Hirondelle Family was born as a result of a Hirondelle Mk III owner, David Trotter, and the original designer Chris Hammond, modifying the Mk III moulds. The most important differences were a wider beam (about 600mm extra), more freeboard (allowing more comfort in the cabin), the starboard forward berth was removed and replaced by a larger functional galley, the heads became much bigger and even able to sport a shower, the rudders were underslung (enabling "sugar scoop" transoms to be used), and windows were installed over the quarter berths. A major improvement in space was also achieved by the new bridge deck nacelle, which allowed more foot room at the central table.

An Aero Rig was also fitted to some Hirondelle 'Family' boats in place of the conventional Bermuda sloop configuration.
