= Piel CP-10 Pinocchio =

1940s French light aircraft

CP-10 Pinocchio

General information
- Type: Single seat, tandem wing sport aircraft
- National origin: France
- Designer: Claude Piel
- Number built: 1

History
- First flight: 25 September 1948

The Piel CP-10 was a post-war French sports aircraft in the Pou du Ciel tradition and was the first design from Claude Piel to fly.

== Design and development ==
The CP-10 Pinocchio was the first of Claude Piel's long line of light aircraft designs. Despite the common name, it was completely different to his second design, the CP-20 Pinocchio. Built by Piel and Roger Holleville, the CP-10 was a Pou du Ciel style, single seat tandem-wing aircraft, powered by a 19 kW (25 hp) Mengin B flat-twin engine mounted in the nose with its cylinder heads exposed for cooling and driving a two bladed propeller.

The larger, forward wing was mounted above the flat sided fuselage on each side by two pairs of short, inverted-V struts from the fuselage to the wing rotation axis. The angle of incidence was controlled from the open cockpit by long rods from the lower fuselage to the wing underside near the trailing edge. The shorter span rear wing was mounted on top of the fuselage immediately behind the cockpit. The CP-10 had a straight edged fin and rounded, balanced rudder. Each main wheel of its fixed, tail wheel undercarriage was mounted on a hinged V-strut to the lower fuselage and with a shock absorber on a strut to the upper fuselage.

The CP-10 Pinocchio first flew on 25 September 1948 at Moisselles but was damaged in an accident there on 17 January 1949.

== Specifications ==
General characteristics

- Crew: One
- Length: 4.10 m (13 ft 5 in)
- Wingspan: 5.70 m (18 ft 8 in)
- Height: 1.85 m (6 ft 1 in)
- Wing area: 12 m^{2} (130 sq ft)
- Empty weight: 140 kg (309 lb)
- Max takeoff weight: 250 kg (551 lb)
- Powerplant: 1 × Mengin B air-cooled flat twin, 19 kW (25 hp)
- Propellers: 2-bladed
