= Nieuport-Delage NiD 37 =

NiD 37
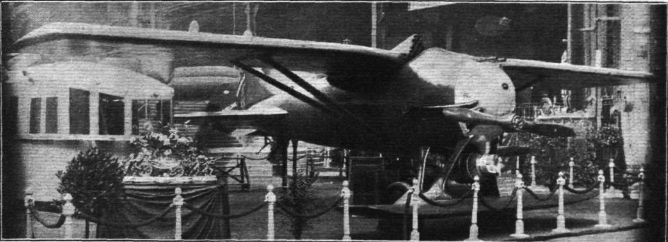
- Nieuport-Deage NiD.37 fighter at the 1922 Paris Show

General information
- Type: Single-seat fighter
- National origin: France
- Manufacturer: Nieuport-Delage
- Designer: E. Dieudonné
- Number built: 1

History
- First flight: April 1923

The Nieuport-Delage NiD 37 was a single-engine, single-seat monoplane fighter aircraft and racer designed and built in France in the early 1920s. It had a small foreplane to bring the centre of pressure forward. Heavy, slower than expected and with turbo-supercharger problems, development ended without any entering service.

== Design and development ==
Though the NiD 37 has sometimes been termed a sesquiplane, it could be described as a shoulder-wing monoplane with a small foreplane. Its immediate predecessor was the NiD 31, which had a similar flying surface. The two designs had little else in common however.

The fuselage of the NiD 37 was constructed in Nieuport-Delage's standard manner with a monocoque shell of spirally wound and glued tulipwood with a final outer fabric covering. This gave a smooth finish to the circular cross section structure which tapered gently to the tail from a dome-shaped nose housing the 224 kW (300 hp) Hispano-Suiza 8Fb water-cooled V-8 engine and its Rateau turbo-supercharger. The engine was mounted with its output shaft low in the nose and drove a two-blade propeller. Though this was of the wooden, fixed-pitch type, it was intended that it would be replaced by a variable-pitch Lavasseur airscrew later. A single, cylindrical Lamblin radiator was suspended below the engine between the undercarriage legs.

Dieudonné, the designer of the NiD 37, paid particular attention to the pilot's field of view, and the open cockpit, with screen and faired headrest, was placed well forward, above the engine. To improve the pilot's view downward, the leading edges of the main wing, which were otherwise straight and unswept, were curved in towards the root, meeting the fuselage behind the pilot who could see vertically down between the wing and the trailing edge of the foreplane, aligned with the leading edge of the outer sections of the mainplane and mounted well below on the undercarriage struts. Apart from long, curved tips, this foreplane had straight edges and constant chord; it had a span of about 40% that of the mainplane and less than 20% of its area. Its function was largely to bring the centre of pressure forward. The main wing was slightly tapered away from its roots and with square tips. It was built around four spars and covered in stressed 3-ply, with long-span ailerons. On each side a V-form pair of tubular struts within aerofoil fairings braced the lower fuselage to the wing.

The trailing edge of the mainplane had a long fillet reaching almost to the curved leading edge of the broad tailplane; mounted at mid-fuselage, this had strong inboard sweep, decreasing outwards. It carried horn-balanced elevators. The fin was smaller, with a rounded, balanced rudder. The NiD 37 had a fixed, conventional undercarriage with its mainwheels, streamlined with partial (45°) aluminium fairings, mounted on faired V-struts. These had short forward projections to carry the foreplane at axle height.

The NiD 37 first appeared in public at the Paris Air Show in December 1922, though it had not then flown. It carried twin 7.7 mm (0.303 in) Vickers machine guns mounted in the nose in front of the cockpit and over the engine.

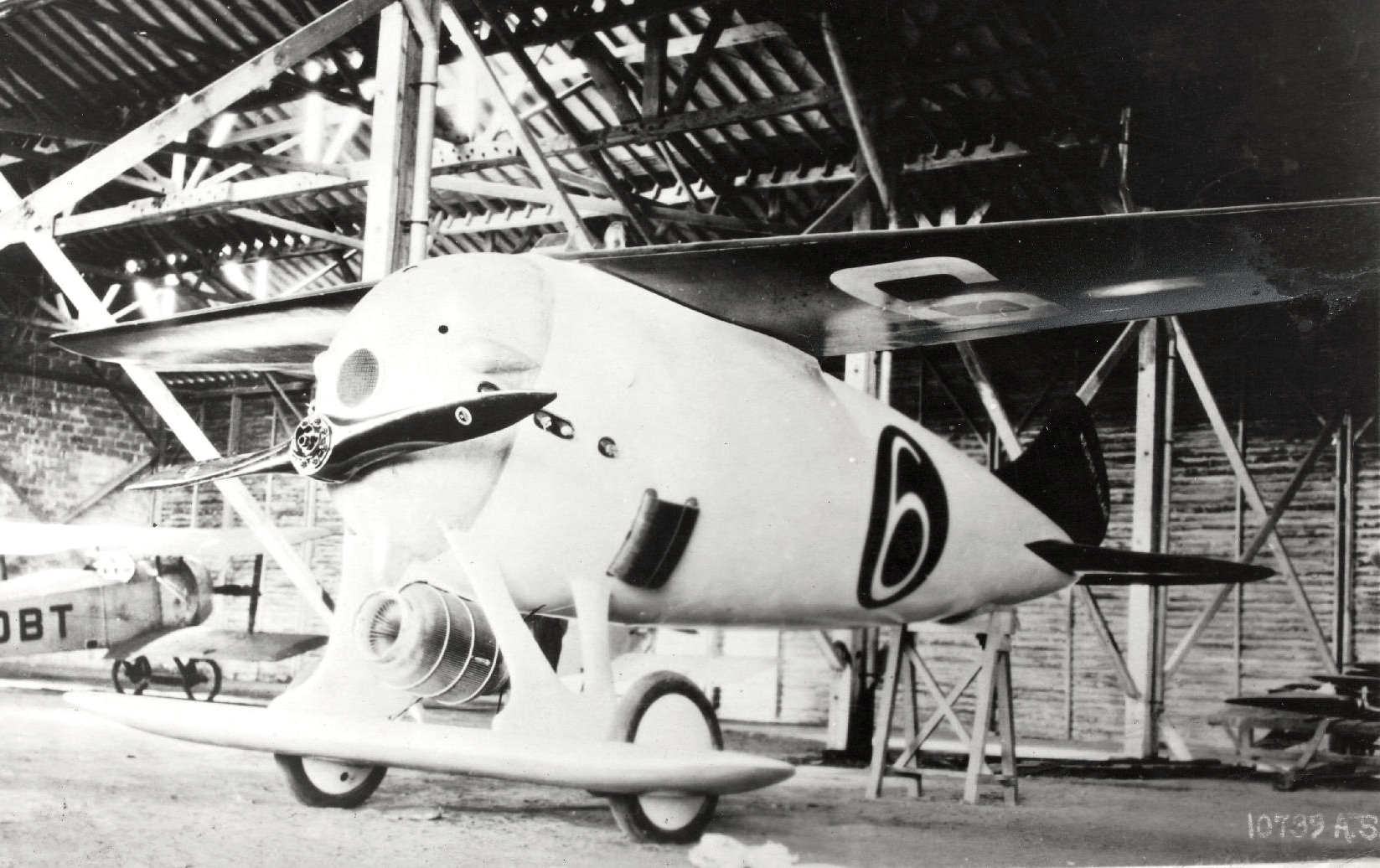
Nieuport-Delage NiD.37 racer built for the 1922 Coupe Deutsch

Its first flight took place the following April. Tests proved disappointing as the NiD 37 was heavy compared with its competitors and slower than expected and never achieved the predicted 250 km/h (155 mph) top speed. There were also problems with the turbo-supercharger because of the limitations of the high-temperature alloys of the time. As a result of these problems, development was abandoned.

=== Related developments ===
A second aircraft was built as a racer with a substantially reduced wing area and a cantilevered upper wing. Some sources list this as a NiD 37, others as the 41. After a carburetor fire during the 1922 Coupe Deutsch, it withdrew and was retired permanently.

Nieuport-Delage also had plans for a larger three seat development of the same concept under the designation NiD.39, also with the pilot over the engine, however with the lack of success of the fighter/racer, it was not proceeded with and the number was reused for an unrelated biplane airliner.

== Specifications for Nieuport-Delage 37 C.1 fighter ==
Data from Green and Swanborough

General characteristics

- Crew: One
- Length: 7.16 m (23 ft 6 in)
- Wingspan: 11.80 m (38 ft 9 in)
- Height: 2.97 m (9 ft 9 in)
- Wing area: 26.80 m^{2} (288.5 sq ft) total; upper wing 21.78 m^{2} (234.4 sq ft)
- Empty weight: 980 kg (2,161 lb)
- Gross weight: 1,420 kg (3,131 lb)
- Fuel capacity: 240 L (53 imp gal; 63 US gal)
- Powerplant: 1 × Hispano-Suiza 8Fb upright water cooled V-8, 220 kW (300 hp)
- Propellers: 2-bladed fixed pitch

Performance

- Maximum speed: 250 km/h (160 mph, 130 kn) at 7,000 m (23,000 ft) estimated, but not achieved
- Wing loading: 53 kg/m^{2} (10.8 lb/sq ft) including both flying surfaces
- Power/mass: 0.16 kW/kg (0.095 hp/lb)

Armament

- 2 × 7.7 mm (0.303 in) Vickers machine guns fixed in nose
