= Ponnier D.III =

D.III
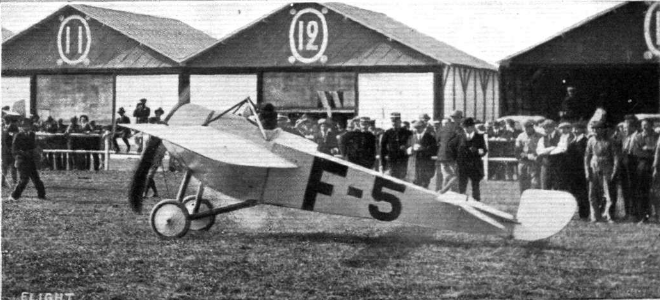
- Emile Védrines in the D.III at Rheims for the Gordon-Bennett race

General information
- Type: Racing aircraft
- National origin: France
- Manufacturer: Avions Ponnier
- Designer: Alfred Pagny
- Number built: 1

History
- First flight: 1913

The Ponnier D.III was a French monoplane racing aircraft, designed to compete in the 1913 Gordon Bennett Trophy race. It finished a close second.

== Development ==
During 1911 René Hanriot hired Alfred Pagny, previously at Nieuport, as a designer. After Hanriot military prototypes failed to win orders at the Concours Militaire in late 1911 he sold his aircraft interests to another of his designers, Louis Alfred Ponnier. Pagny designed two similar single seat monoplanes for Hanriot and Ponnier, the Hanriot D.I and the Ponnier D.III; the latter was sometimes referred to as the Hanriot D.III. His designs reflected Nieuport practice, particularly with the replacement of Hanriot's graceful boat-like shell fuselages with flat sided, deep chested ones.

The Ponnier D.III was a single seat, mid wing monoplane designed to compete in the 1913 Gordon Bennett Trophy race. Pairs of landing wires on each side met over the fuselage at a pyramidal four strut pylon and parallel flying wires went to the lower fuselage. An oil deflecting cowling, open at the bottom, surrounded the powerful double row, fourteen cylinder Gnome Lambda-Lambda rotary engine, which delivered 160 hp (119 kW) to a 2 m diameter propeller. The oval, open cockpit was placed at mid-wing, just aft of the pylon centre. It had a finless rudder at the extreme rear of the fuselage and a straight edged tailplane mounted on the upper fuselage ahead of it. The elevators were aerodynamically separate but interconnected, controlled by central wires. The D.III had a fixed, conventional undercarriage with mainwheels on a single axle mounted to the fuselage by pairs of wire cross-braced V-struts, plus a simple elliptical leaf spring tailskid.

Jane's All the World's Aircraft 1913 describes a longer (6.65 m (21 ft 10 in)) Hanriot D.III with a 100 hp (75 kW) Gnome engine; this motor does not appear in other cited contemporary accounts.

== Operational history ==
The D.III participated in the Gordon-Bennett Trophy race held at Rheims and piloted by Emile Védrines. The elimination race over 100 km (62 mi) left four aircraft in the final, flown over 200 km (124 mi) on Monday 29 September. After an hour's flight the Ponnier finished second, just 66 seconds behind Maurice Prévost in a Deperdussin Monocoque; both aircraft used the same double row engine.

== Specifications (160 hp Gnome) ==
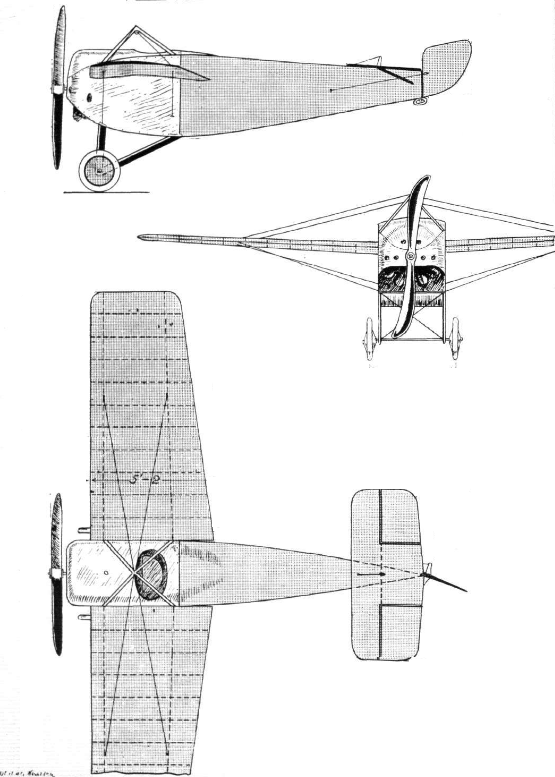

Data from Flight 22 November 1913

General characteristics

- Crew: One
- Length: 5.41 m (17 ft 9 in)
- Wingspan: 7.16 m (23 ft 6 in)
- Wing area: 8.7 m^{2} (94 sq ft)
- Gross weight: 500 kg (1,102 lb)
- Powerplant: 1 × Gnome Lambda-Lambda 14-cylinder, two row rotary engine, 120 kW (160 hp)
- Propellers: 2-bladed, 2.08 m (6 ft 10 in) diameter

Performance

- Maximum speed: 200 km/h (120 mph, 110 kn)
