= Piel Onyx =

1980s French light aircraft

CP.150 Onyx

General information
- Type: Ultralight
- National origin: France
- Designer: Claude Piel

The Piel CP-150 Onyx is a single-seat, low-cost and low-power ultralight aircraft. The aircraft was designed by French aeronautical engineer Claude Piel. The aircraft is an all-wood single seat microlight based on Mignet principles with fixed tricycle undercarriage and one 12 hp Solo engine.

== Specifications ==
Data from Jane's All the World's Aircraft 1987–88, p.587

General characteristics

- Crew: One pilot
- Length: 3.53 m (11 ft 7 in)
- Wingspan: 7.30 m (24 ft 0 in)
- Wing area: 12.8 m^{2} (138 sq ft)
- Gross weight: 180 kg (400 lb)
- Powerplant: 1 × Solo , 9.0 kW (12 hp)
