= Piel Diamant =

1960s French light aircraft

CP.60 Diamant
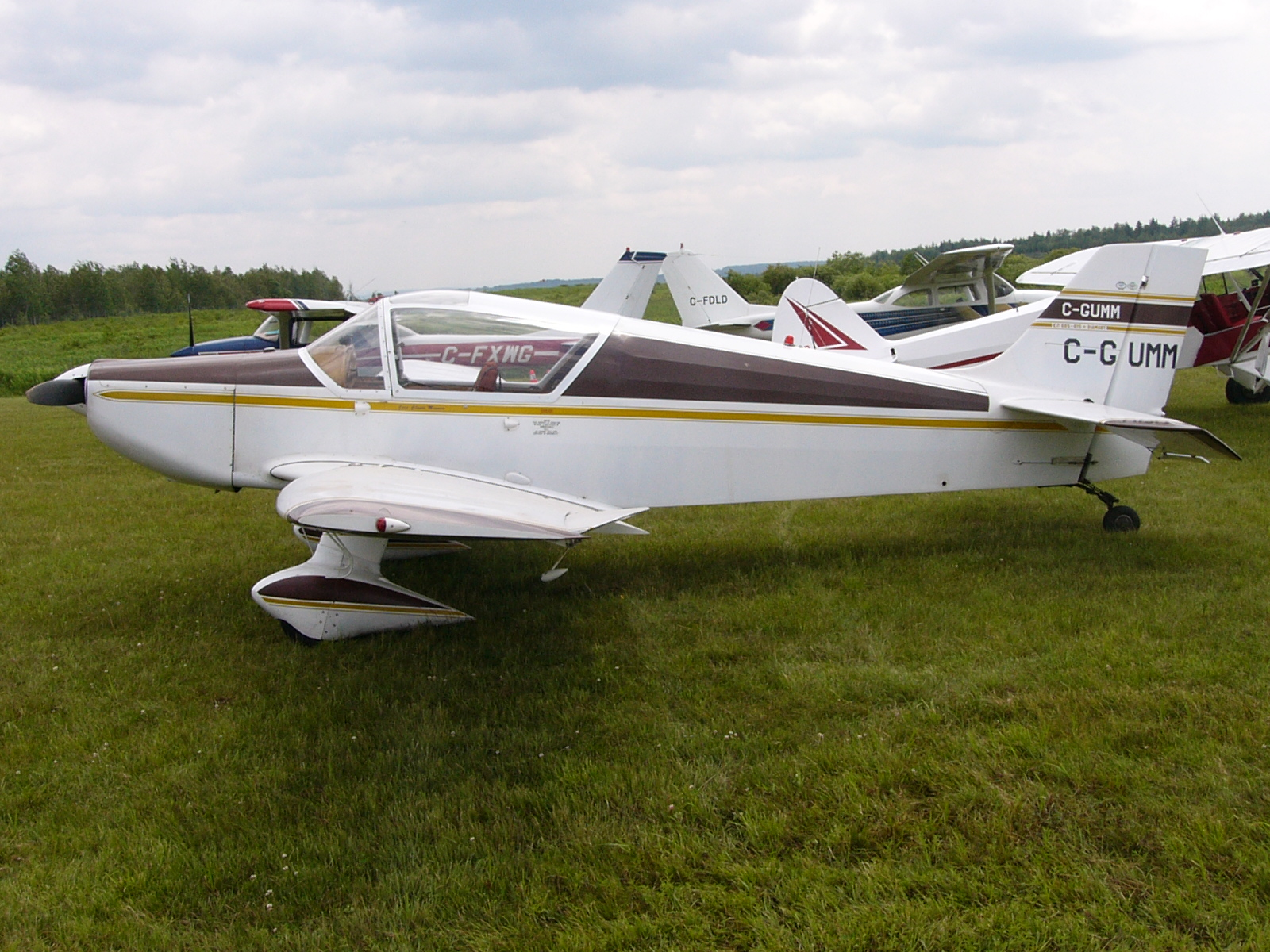
- Piel C.P. 605 Diamant

General information
- Type: civil utility aircraft
- National origin: France
- Manufacturer: Homebuilt
- Designer: Claude Piel

The Piel CP.60 Diamant is a single-engine light aircraft designed in France in the 1960s and marketed for home building.

== Design and development ==
The Diamant is a conventional, low-wing cantilever monoplane and essentially an enlarged version of Piel's successful Emeraude designed to accommodate more passengers. This extra capacity is provided by a redesigned fuselage which is higher in the rear section and longer overall. While the Emeraude has only two seats, side-by-side, the Diamant has an extra bench seat at the rear of the cabin to seat one or two more people. The wingspan is also greater than that of the Emeraude, allowing for a greater maximum take-off weight. The 110 page set of plans included modifications for retractable gear, tricycle gear, and wing mounted fuel tanks.

As with the Emeraude, Piel obtained type certification for the Diamant, allowing it to be manufactured on a commercial basis. However, unlike the Emeraude, this did not actually transpire, and the Diamant was only ever built as a homebuilt.

By the late 1970s, the original versions of the Diamant were no longer offered and had been supplanted by the Super Diamant, designed for more powerful engines and featuring revised tail surfaces.

== Variants ==
- CP.60 Diamant - prototype with 90 hp (67 kW) Continental engine.
- CP.601 Diamant - version with 100 hp (75 kW) Continental engine.
- CP.602 Diamant - version with 115 hp (86 kW) Potez engine.
- CP.603 Diamant - version with 115 hp Lycoming engine
- CP.604 Super Diamant - version with 145 horsepower (108 kW) Continental engine.
- CP.605 Super Diamant - 4 seat version with 150 kW (201 hp) Lycoming O-320-E2A engine.
- CP.605B Super Diamant - CP.605 with retractable tricycle landing gear.
- CP.606 Super Diamant - version with 140 hp Lycoming engine
- CP.607 Super Diamant - version with 130 hp Continental engine
- CP.608 Super Diamant - version with 180 hp Lycoming engine
- CP.615 Super Diamant - version with 160 hp engine

== Specifications (CP.605B) ==
Data from

General characteristics

- Crew: One pilot
- Capacity: 2-3 passengers
- Length: 7.00 m (23 ft 0 in)
- Wingspan: 9.20 m (30 ft 2 in)
- Height: 2.00 m (6 ft 7 in)
- Wing area: 13.30 m^{2} (143.2 sq ft)
- Aspect ratio: 6.4:1
- Airfoil: NACA 23015
- Empty weight: 520 kg (1,146 lb)
- Max takeoff weight: 850 kg (1,874 lb)
- Powerplant: 1 × Lycoming O-320_E2A , 110 kW (150 hp)

Performance

- Maximum speed: 260 km/h (160 mph, 140 kn)
- Cruise speed: 230 km/h (140 mph, 120 kn) (econ cruise, 65% power)
- Stall speed: 82 km/h (51 mph, 44 kn) (flaps down)
- Never exceed speed: 280 km/h (170 mph, 150 kn)
- Range: 1,150 km (710 mi, 620 nmi)
- Service ceiling: 5,000 m (16,000 ft)
- Rate of climb: 5.50 m/s (1,082 ft/min)
