= Western Hirondelle =

Hirondelle

General information
- Type: Homebuilt monoplane
- National origin: Canada
- Manufacturer: Western Aircraft Supplies

History
- First flight: 1976

Western Hirondelle (specifically the Western PGK-1 Hirondelle) is a Canadian two-seat aircraft for cross country and recreational flying, designed by Western Aircraft Supplies to be homebuilt from plans. The name is French for the Swallow, and the model designation includes the initials of the designers Jean Peters, Glenn Gibb, and John Kopala.

== Description ==
The prototype first flew in 1976. The Hirondelle is built primarily of wood and cloth. It is a low-wing cantilever monoplane with a fixed tail-wheel landing gear and seats two side-by-side. It was designed for the Lycoming O-235 but accommodates engines from 100 to 160 hp (75 to 119 kW).

The primary wing structure is a wood box spar connected to an aileron spar by ribs cut on a band saw. To the front of the main spar are strapped D-shaped fiberglass fuel tanks which can carry up to 12 imperial gallons per wing. Over the tanks is the framing and plywood skin of the wing's nose. Behind the main spar, the wings are covered in cloth. The wing section is the NACA 23012 with a 55 in (140 cm) chord; the wing is rectangular, being straight and untapered. No flaps were fitted to the prototype, but they were being considered.

The fuselage is built up from spruce and covered in 3 mm (0.12 in) plywood. Cabin width on the prototype was 38 in (97 cm). The main gear uses Wittman tapered rods and was designed to take standard Cessna wheel pants. As with the Wittman Tailwind, the mains connect to the engine mount. The wing tanks feed a 5.75 imperial gallons (26.1 L; 6.91 US gal) header tank through automotive electric fuel pumps. The header tank feeds the engine by gravity.

The prototype weight includes an upholstered interior, a full electrical system and venturi driven gyros. With its 108 hp (81 kW) engine it can cruise at 135 mph (217 km/h) at 2500 rpm.

== Specifications ==
General characteristics

- Crew: 2
- Length: 20 ft 6 in (6.25 m)
- Wingspan: 26 ft 0 in (7.93 m)
- Height: 7 ft 6 in (2.29 m)
- Wing area: 120 sq ft (11 m^{2})
- Empty weight: 933 lb (423 kg)
- Gross weight: 1,475 lb (669 kg)
- Powerplant: 1 × Lycoming O-235 , 108 hp (81 kW)

Performance

- Cruise speed: 145 mph (232 km/h, 126 kn)
- Rate of climb: 800 ft/min (4.1 m/s)
- Wing loading: 12.3 lb/sq ft (60 kg/m^{2})

== See also ==
Aircraft of comparable role, configuration, and era

- Jodel DR1050 Excellence
- SAN Jodel D.150 Mascaret
- Piel Emeraude
- Turner T-40A
- McLeod Cavalier SA102 series
