= Garland Aircraft Company =

British aircraft manufacturer

The Garland Aircraft Company was a British aircraft manufacturer that operated in the late 1950s and 1960s.

== History ==
Patrick Garland and Doug Bianchi built a version of the French Piel Emeraude light aircraft that would meet British airworthiness requirements. Named the Garland-Bianchi Linnet it was built at White Waltham Airfield and first flown on 1 September 1958 from Fairoaks Airfield. The Garland Aircraft Company was formed to put the Linnet into production. The company built two Linnets, although the second was not completed and it was sold to Fairtravel Limited to continue production as the Fairtravel Linnet II.

== Aircraft ==
- 1958 – Garland-Bianchi Linnet
