= Nieuport-Delage NiD 940 =

NiD-940
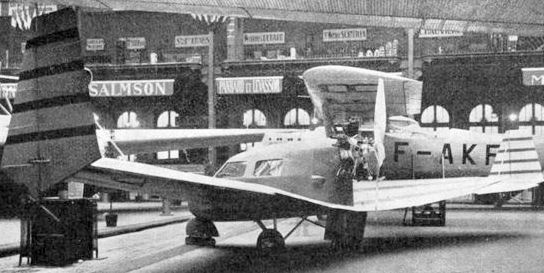

General information
- Type: Two/three seat touring aircraft
- National origin: France
- Manufacturer: Nieuport
- Designer: Charles Pillon
- Number built: 1

History
- First flight: February 1934

The Nieuport-Delage NiD 940 was a French, tailless, pusher configuration touring aircraft first flown in 1934. It suffered from longitudinal instabilities and despite modifications and a more powerful engine, it did not receive its Certificate of Airworthiness.

== Design and development ==
The NiD 940 was a low cantilever wing aircraft. Its wing had a thick section and a chrome-steel tube structure and in plan was swept with straight-taper. Elevons, hinged at right angles to the line of flight, controlled both pitch and roll. Triangular wing tip fins, externally braced from tip to wing, provided yaw stability and carried generous, five-sided, angular rudders which could operate together for directional control but also be opened at right angles as air brakes. The wings could be folded for transport.

The fuselage of the NiD 940 was also a steel tube structure, flat-sided and short, not reaching the wing trailing edge. It was covered with tulipwood plywood overlain with fabric. A well glazed cabin provided two side-by-side seats, with room for a third seat and baggage space behind them. The steel structure also mounted an 89 kW (120 hp) Lorraine 5Pc five-cylinder radial engine in uncowled pusher configuration.

The NiD 940 had tricycle landing gear, with its mainwheels on V-struts hinged from the lower fuselage and with vertical shock absorber legs to the wings. Wingtips were protected by skids mounted on the bottom of the fins. The nosewheel was large and well forward.

In its initial form the prototype was known as the NiD 941. Though this was on display in November 1932 at the 13th Paris Salon de l'Aviation, it did not fly until February 1934, piloted by Nieuport's test pilot Joseph Sadi-Lecointe. The early trials showed a lack of longitudinal stability. Despite modifications and a new 101 kW (135 hp) Salmson 9Nc nine-cylinder radial engine, after which it became the NiD 942, an airworthiness certificate was not granted.

== Variants ==
NiD 941
original aircraft with Lorraine 5Ps engine.
NiD 942
modified aircraft with Salmson 9Nc engine.

== Specifications ==
Data from Nieuport 1909-1950, p.216

General characteristics

- Crew: One
- Capacity: one or two passengers
- Length: 5.05 m (16 ft 7 in)
- Wingspan: 13.30 m (43 ft 8 in)
- Height: 2.35 m (7 ft 9 in)
- Wing area: 27 m^{2} (290 sq ft)
- Empty weight: 615 kg (1,356 lb)
- Gross weight: 1,039 kg (2,291 lb)
- Fuel capacity: fuel and oil, 90 kg (200 lb)
- Powerplant: 1 × Lorraine 5Pc 5-cylinder radial, 89 kW (120 hp)
- Propellers: 2-bladed

Performance

- Maximum speed: 220 km/h (140 mph, 120 kn) at ground level
- Range: 600 km (370 mi, 320 nmi)
- Service ceiling: 6,800 m (22,300 ft) service
- Time to altitude: 9 min 50 sec to 2,000 m (6,600 ft)
- Landing speed: 70 km/h (43 mph)
