= Hanriot D.I =

French monoplane racing aircraft

D.I
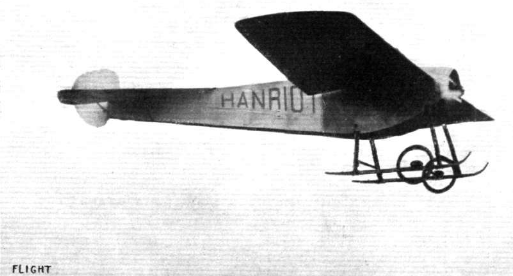

General information
- Type: Racing aircraft
- National origin: France
- Manufacturer: Avions Ponnier
- Designer: Alfred Pagny

History
- First flight: early 1912
- Developed into: Ponnier D.III

The Hanriot D.I was a French monoplane racing aircraft, designed in France in 1912 and strongly influenced by Nieuport practice. Examples were built and raced both in France and the UK during 1912.

== Development ==
During 1911 René Hanriot hired Alfred Pagny, previously at Nieuport, as a designer. Pagny's designs reflected Nieuport practice, particularly with the replacement of Hanriot's graceful boat-like shell fuselages with flat sided, deep chested ones. His first such monoplane design for Hanriot was the D.I, often known as the Hanriot-Pagny monoplane though since Hanriot sold his aircraft interests to another of his designers, Louis Alfred Ponnier, later in 1911 this aircraft is alternatively known as the Ponnier D.I.

The Hanriot D.I was a single seat, Nieuport style mid wing monoplane, with slightly tapered, straight edged wings. Landing wires on each side met over the fuselage at a short pyramidal four strut pylon like that on the Nieuport IV. The single, open cockpit was under the pylon. Like the Nieuport, it had a braced, broad chord tailplane, with a strongly swept leading edge, mounted on top of the rectangular section fuselage and a deep, broad chord rudder with no fin moving between the elevators. The undercarriage used the standard Hanriot box with two longitudinal skids forming the lower edge of a cross-braced box, with four legs, a cross bar and an axle forming the other sides. The skids were upturned at the front to avoid nose-overs and the rear of the skid ran on the ground on landing, slowing the aircraft and preventing the tail from hitting the ground.

The D.I was powered either by a 50 hp (37 kW) Gnome rotary engine, partially enclosed in an oil deflecting cowling, open at the bottom or a 6-cylinder Anzani static radial engine of the same power.

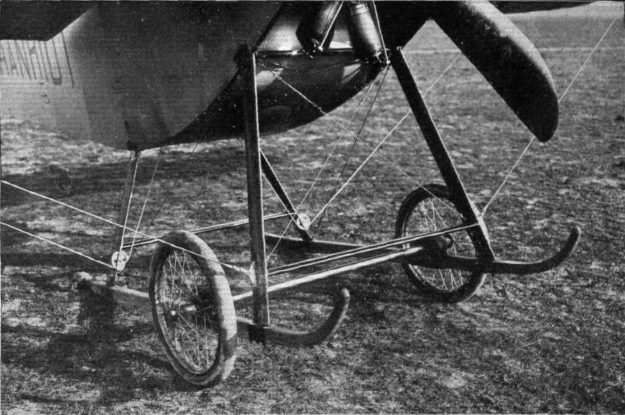
4-legged undercarriage with long skids on a Hanriot D.I with a Gnome engine

== Operational history ==
A D.I performed at Rheims in both 1912 and 1913. In August and September 1912 one appeared in the UK, first at Brooklands and then racing at Hendon. In February 1913 a Hanriot, very similar to the D.I but fitted with an 80 hp (60 kW) Gnome engine made a flight across the Alps.

At least one D.I was built early in 1912 in the UK by the recently founded Hanriot (England) Ltd company.

The Hanriot D.I formed the basis of the much more powerful but otherwise similar Ponnier D.III 1913 Gordon Bennett Trophy racer.

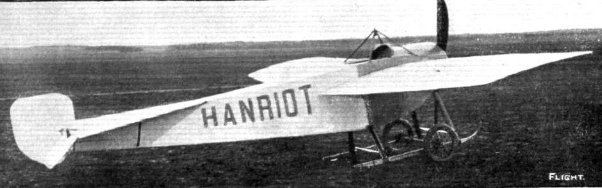
English built Hanriot D.I

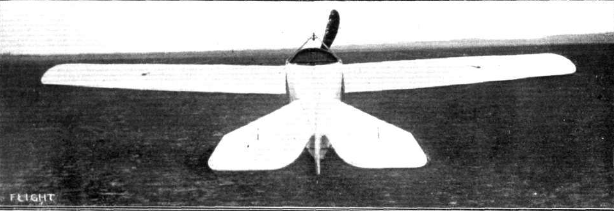
English built Hanriot D.I

== Specifications (Gnome engine) ==
Data from Opdycke, p.208

General characteristics

- Crew: One
- Length: 7.08 m (23 ft 3 in)
- Wingspan: 8.9 m (29 ft 2 in)
- Wing area: 18 m^{2} (190 sq ft)
- Empty weight: 300 kg (661 lb) with the Anzani engine which was 16 kg (35 lb) heavier than the Gnome.
- Gross weight: 465 kg (1,025 lb)
- Powerplant: 1 × Gnome 7-cylinder rotary engine, 37 kW (50 hp)
- Propellers: 2-bladed

Performance

- Maximum speed: 110 km/h (68 mph, 59 kn)
