= Claude Piel =

French aircraft designer (1921–1982)

- Born: January 15, 1921; Paris, France
- Died: August 19, 1982
- Known for: Aircraft designer

Claude Piel (15 January 1921 – 19 August 1982) was a notable French aircraft designer.

== Biography ==
Piel was born in Paris, the son of an aeronautical carpenter. One of the best known French designers of light aircraft, over the years, Piel designed several single and two seat aeroplanes, the Emeraude and Diamant being the best known. His first amateur design was adapted from the Mignet Pou du Ciel ("Flying Flea"). Designated CP10, this aircraft, begun in 1943, was only ever a prototype. It crashed in 1949 after only 5h30m flight time. Piel himself was piloting and was lucky to escape from the accident.

Piel worked for a variety of French aeronautical companies as a designer. In 1948, he went to work with the Boisavia company where his professional career in aircraft design began. In 1952, he left Boisavia and joined Robert Denize where he designed the CP20, which looked like a miniature Spitfire - its wing shape especially. The CP20 was to be the basis of his subsequent designs, the highly successful CP30 Emeraude. Copavia began to manufacture the Emeraude commercially.

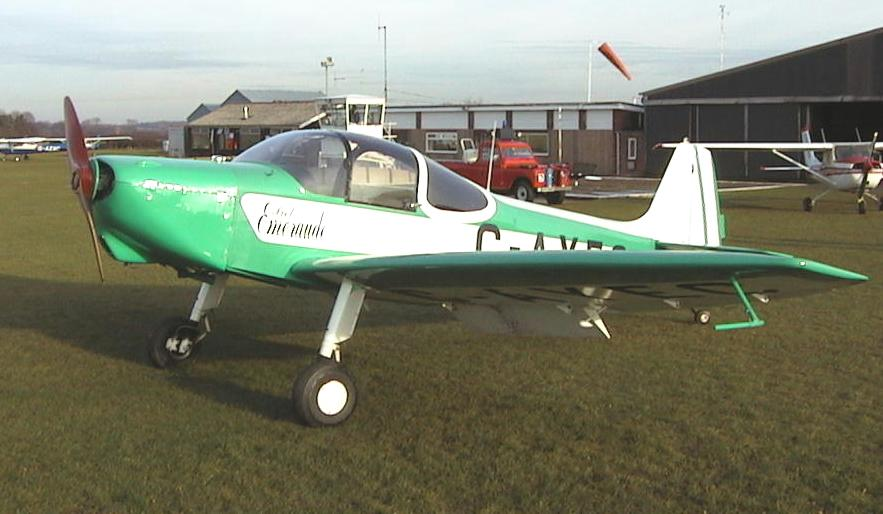
Piel's most famous design, the Emeraude. This is a CP301A variant.

Piel then went to work for SCANOR (Société des Constructions Aéronautiques du Nord), who also produced Emeraudes. He also sold copies of his plans to amateurs who built their own aeroplanes.

The Scintex company was established in 1956 by Jean-Michel Vernhes and set up a production line to make Emeraudes, by now in great demand from French flying clubs and private owners. Initially, Scintex made the standard CP.301A model. In 1959, Piel moved to Scintex and the following year they developed the CP301C variant, which had a sliding canopy instead of the upward-opening doors of the earlier model. Scintex also built the Super Emeraude, with an airframe strengthened for aerobatics and a cleaner external design. Most Scintex Emeraudes and Super Emeraudes were built in the Menavia factory at Clermont-Ferrand.

Piel later moved to CAARP (Cooperatives des Ateliers Aéronautiques de la Region Parisienne). In 1965, CAARP was set up by Auguste Mudry, principally as a design bureau using the skills of Piel, Nenad Hrissatovic and Louis de Goncourt. The company originally built CP1310-C3 Super Emeraudes, and went on to make the CP100 and CAP10 derivatives.

Other designs from Piel included the CP.60 Diamant, CP.80 racer and CP.150 Onyx microlight.

== Complete list of designs ==
Designs
Model	Builder	Notes	Prototype	First flight
CP.10 Pinocchio	Piel	Single seat Mignet-formula tandem wing aircraft powered by one 19 kW (25 hp) Poinsard engine	F-WFDA (c/n 01)	
CP.20 Pinocchio	Piel	Low wing single seater with fixed tailwheel undercarriage powered by one 19 kW (25 hp) Volkswagen engine	F-WGGL	1951
CP.30 Emeraude	Piel	Side by side two seater developed from CP.20 powered by on 48 kW (65 hp) Continental A65 and fitted with fixed cockpit canopy and forward-hinged doors	F-WFVY (c/n 01)	19 June 1954
CP.301 Emeraude	Scintex, SOCA, SCANOR, Rouchaud	Initial commercial production model of Emeraude. Later aircraft had sliding cockpit canopy. Powered by one 67 kW (90 hp) Continental C90-14F engine.		
CP.301A Emeraude		Standard Emeraude powered by a 67 kW (90 hp) Continental C90		
CP.301B Emeraude	Rousseau	CP.301A with smaller control surfaces, sliding canopy and spats.		
CP.301C Emeraude	Scintex	CP.301A with bubble canopy, revised cowling etc. Minor equipment changes on CP.301C-1, C-2 and C-3.		
CP.301D Emeraude	Bastet	CP.301A with retractable undercarriage and variable pitch prop. One aircraft.	F-PLUN (c/n 361)	
CP.301S Smaragd	Binder Aviatik	CP.301A with sliding canopy and enlarged dorsal fin		
CP.302 Emeraude	Amateur	CP.301 powered by one 67 kW (90 hp) Salmson air-cooled radial engine.		
CP.303 Emeraude	Amateur	CP.301 powered by one 63 kW (85 hp) Salmson air-cooled radial engine.		
CP.304 Emeraude	Amateur			
CP.305 Emeraude	Amateur	CP.301 powered by one 86 kW (115 hp) Lycoming O-235-C engine.	F-PJCE (c/n 354)	
CP.308 Emeraude	Amateur	CP.301 powered by one 56 kW (75 hp) Continental C75-12	F-PINR (c/n 27)	
CP.310 Emeraude	Amateur	CP.301 powered by one 75 kW (100 hp) Continental O-200A.		
CP.315 Emeraude	Amateur			
CP.316 Emeraude	Amateur	CP.301 powered by one 78 kW (105 hp) Potez 4E-20	F-PKMX (c/n 352)	
CP.319 Emeraude	Amateur	CP.301 powered by one 67 kW (90 hp) Continental C90-14F	F-PNUT (c/n 367)	
CP.320 Super Emeraude	Amateur	CP.1310 airframe fitted with 100 hp Continental O-200A.		
CP.321 Super Emeraude	Amateur	CP.320 airframe fitted with 78 kW (105 hp) Potez 4E-20 engine.		
CP.323 Super Emeraude	Amateur	CP.320 with swept fin and 78 kW (105 hp) Lycoming engine.		
CP.324 Emeraude Club	Amateur			
CP.325 Super Emeraude	Amateur	CP.320 with modified wing and 67 kW (90 hp) Continental C90-14F engine.	F-PHVZ (c/n 359)	
CP.40 Donald	Piel	High wing single seater with fixed tailwheel undercarriage and 19 kW (25 hp) Volkswagen engine.	F-WGYE (c/n 1)	16 June 1953
CP.41	Piel	F-WGYE converted with Persy II engine		
CP.402	Amateur	CP.40 with 48 kW (65 hp) Continental A65-8S engine.	F-POIU (c/n 2)	
Piel CP.500	Not built	4 seat push-pull twin of Mignet design with two Lycoming O-320 engines.		
CP.60 Diamant	Amateur	CP.301 with wider fuselage and longer cabin seating three. Powered by one 67 kW (90 hp) Continental C90-14F engine.	F-PJXP	2 Dec 1961
CP.601 Diamant	Amateur	CP.60 with wing inboard leading edge fillet. Powered by a 75 kW (100 hp) Continental O-200A.	F-PKVG	
CP.602 Diamant	Amateur	CP.601 with 78 kW (105 hp) Potez 4E-20 engine.		
CP.603 Super Diamant	Amateur	CP.60 with retractable tricycle undercarriage, swept tail and 86 kW (115 hp) Lycoming O-235-C1.	F-PNUN	
CP.604 Diamant	Amateur	CP.60 powered by 108 kW (145 hp) Continental O-300-B engine.		
CP.605 SuperDiamant	Amateur	CP.60 with swept tail and 110 kW (150 hp) Lycoming O-320 engine.		
CP.605B SuperDiamant	Amateur	CP.603 (F-PNUN) fitted with 110 kW (150 hp) Lycoming O-320 engine.		
CP.606 SuperDiamant	Amateur			
CP.607 SuperDiamant	Amateur	CP.601 fitted with 97 kW (130 hp) Continental O-240.	F-PYIX (c/n 11)	
CP.608 SuperDiamant	Amateur			
CP.615 SuperDiamant	Amateur			
CP.70 Beryl	Piel	CP.301 with tandem dual seats, fixed tricycle undercarriage and 48 kW (65 hp) Continental A65-85 engine.	F-PMEQ (c/n 01)	1965
CP.750 Beryl	Amateur	CP.70 with 110 kW (150 hp) Lycoming O-320, CP.601 wings and tailwheel undercarriage.		
CP.751 Beryl	Amateur	CP.750 with 150 kW (200 hp) Lycoming O-360-A2A engine.		
CP.80 Zephir	Amateur	Single-seat formula 1 racer with fixed tailwheel undercarriage and 75 kW (100 hp) Continental O-200-A engine	F-PVQF (c/n 1)	
CP.801 Zephir	Amateur	CP.80 with 86 kW (115 hp) Lycoming O-235-C2A engine.		
CP.802 Zephir	Amateur	CP.80 with 48 kW (65 hp) Continental A65-8F engine.		
CP.90 Pinocchio II	Piel, prototype only	Single-seat version of CP.301 with 120 kW (160 hp) Lycoming engine.	F-PLCL	27 August 1986
CP.100	CAARP	Aerobatic 2-seater based on the CP.301 with modified tail and wing and 120 kW (160 hp) Lycoming engine.	F-BNTD	August 1966
CP.1310 Super Emeraude		Strengthened Emeraude with revised canopy, tail and engine cowling. Powered by one 75 kW (100 hp) Continental O-200A.	F-BJVJ (c/n 900)	20 April 1962
CP.1315 Super Emeraude		CP.1310 fitted with 78 kW (105 hp) Potez 4E-20 engine.		
CP.1320 Super Emeraude	Amateur	CP.1310 airframe fitted with 75 kW (100 hp) Continental O-200A.		
CP.1320 Saphir	Amateur	3-seater with new tapered wing and strengthened Emeraude fuselage. F-WYIE had fixed tricycle undercarriage. F-PYJS had retractable tailwheel undercarriage. Powered by 110 kW (150 hp) Lycoming O-320-C2A.		
CP.1330 Super Emeraude		CP.1310 fitted with a Lycoming O-235-C2A engine.		
CP.150 Onyx	Amateur	All-wood single seat microlight based on Mignet principles with fixed tricycle undercarriage and one 8.9 kW (12 hp) Solo engine.		
Garland-Bianchi Linnet	Garland-Bianchi	CP.301A built by Garland-Bianchi (UK).		
Fairtravel Linnet	Fairtravel	Linnet with sliding canopy and 75 kW (100 hp) Continental O-200A.		
