= Poullin JP.20 Globe Trotter =

1950s French aircraft

JP.20 Globe Trotter

General information
- Type: Single-seat touring aircraft
- National origin: France
- Designer: Jean Poullin
- Number built: 1

History
- First flight: June 1952

The Poulin JP.20 Globe Trotter was a two-seat, high-wing monoplane touring aircraft built in France in the early 1950s.

== Specifications (JP.20 Globe Trotter) ==
Data from "Poulin JP.20 'Globe Trotter'", Aviafrance

General characteristics

- Crew: 2
- Length: 6.16 m (20 ft 3 in)
- Wingspan: 9 m (29 ft 6 in)
- Gross weight: 551 kg (1,215 lb)
- Powerplant: 1 × Continental A65 4-cylinder horizontally-opposed air-cooled piston engine, 48 kW (65 hp)
- Propellers: 2-bladed fixed-pitch propeller

Performance

- Maximum speed: 157 km/h (98 mph, 85 kn)
