= Piel CP.500 =

1970s French light aircraft design study

CP.500

General information
- Type: utility aircraft
- National origin: France
- Designer: Claude Piel
- Status: Abandoned project

The Piel CP.500 was a light aircraft of unusual configuration designed in France in the 1970s with the intention of marketing it for homebuilding. This did not transpire, however, and no prototype was actually built. It was a tandem wing design, somewhat reminiscent of the Mignet Pou-du-Ciel but considerably larger. Also, unlike the Pou-du-Ciel's unusual control system, the CP.500's pitch and roll control was to come from more conventional elevons mounted on the rear wing. The rear wing was also to carry endplate-style fins and rudders. Twin engines were to be mounted in push-pull fashion at the nose and tail ends of the fuselage, with the aircraft capable of single-engine operation in case of emergency. Two seats were to be provided at the front of the fully enclosed cabin, with a bench seat for three passengers behind them, plus an optional seat for a sixth occupant behind this. The undercarriage was to be of fixed, tricycle configuration. Construction was originally planned to be of wood, with engine cowlings and wingtips of composite construction. However, as development progressed, Piel considered metal as the main construction material.

== Specifications (as designed) ==
Data from Jane's All the World's Aircraft 1977–78, p.497

General characteristics

- Crew: One pilot
- Capacity: 4-5 passengers
- Length: 6.10 m (20 ft 0 in)
- Wingspan: 8.80 m (28 ft 11 in)
- Height: 2.25 m (7 ft 5 in)
- Wing area: 20.3 m^{2} (218 sq ft)
- Empty weight: 866 kg (1,910 lb)
- Gross weight: 1,500 kg (3,310 lb)
- Powerplant: 2 × Lycoming O-320 , 120 kW (160 hp) each

Performance

- Maximum speed: 300 km/h (186 mph, 162 kn)
- Range: 1,200 km (745 mi, 647 nmi)
- Service ceiling: 6,800 m (22,300 ft)
- Rate of climb: 9.0 m/s (1,770 ft/min)
