= Piel Emeraude =

1950s French light aircraft

Emeraude, Super Emeraude, Aeriel
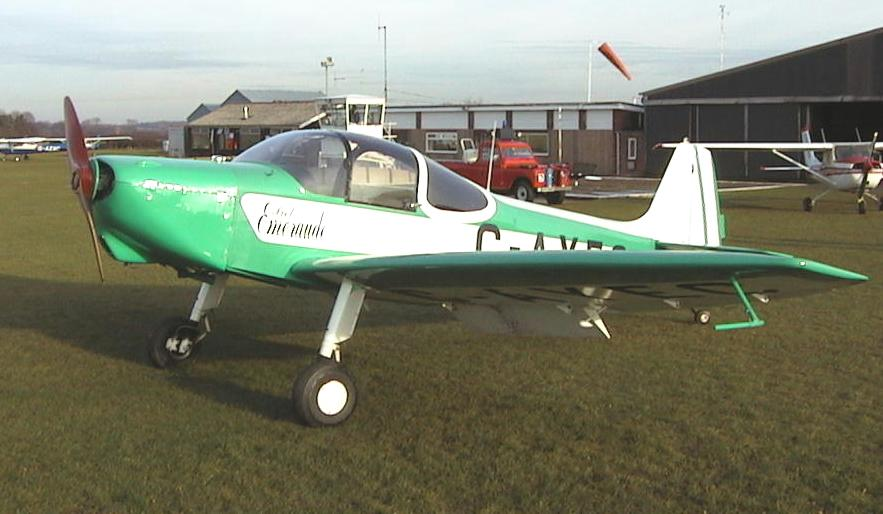
- CP301A Emeraude

General information
- Type: Civil utility aircraft
- Manufacturer: Coopavia, SCANOR, SOCA, Rouchaud, Renard, CAARP, Scintex, Aeronasa, Fairtravel, Durban, Garland, homebuilders
- Designer: Claude Piel

History
- First flight: 19 June 1954

The Piel CP-30 Emeraude (French: émeraude = "emerald") is an aircraft designed in France in the mid-1950s and widely built both by factories and homebuilders.

== Design and development ==
The Emeraude is a low-wing cantilever monoplane with fixed tailwheel undercarriage and side-by-side seating for two. The aircraft uses wood construction with a laminated box spar with an elliptical trailing edge. The prototype was designed and built by Claude Piel, who then licensed manufacture of the aircraft to a number of firms, most significantly Coopavia. These early production machines were similar to the prototype, but were fitted with more powerful engines.

The first major revision of the design was the Super Emeraude, designed by Piel while working at Scintex in the early 1960s. It featured a strengthened airframe and cleaned-up aerodynamics, allowing it to be certified for aerobatics. Much of Scintex's Super Emeraude production was contracted out to CAARP, where the design eventually served as the basis for the CAP-10.

Emeraudes were also produced in the United Kingdom (by Fairtravel as the Linnet) and in South Africa by General Aircraft ("Genair") of Virginia Airport as the Aeriel 2 with imported engines, the first aircraft to be manufactured entirely in that country. The Linnet was modified by the Garland Aircraft Company, formed by P.A.T Garland and D.E. Bianchi, to meet British airworthiness requirements. The first aircraft (G-APNS) was built at White Waltham and first flown on 1 September 1958 by Squadron Leader Neville Duke. Two more aircraft were planned but only one more was built by Garland-Bianchi in 1962. Between 1963 and 1965 three more aircraft were built with 100-hp Rolls-Royce Continental O-200-A engines. The last two aircraft had one-piece sliding cockpit canopies.

== Operational history ==
Reviewers Roy Beisswenger and Marino Boric described the design in a 2015 review as "It is not quick to build, as the timber construction is rather complicated because of the complex forms, but in aesthetic terms it is undoubtedly a success."

== Variants ==
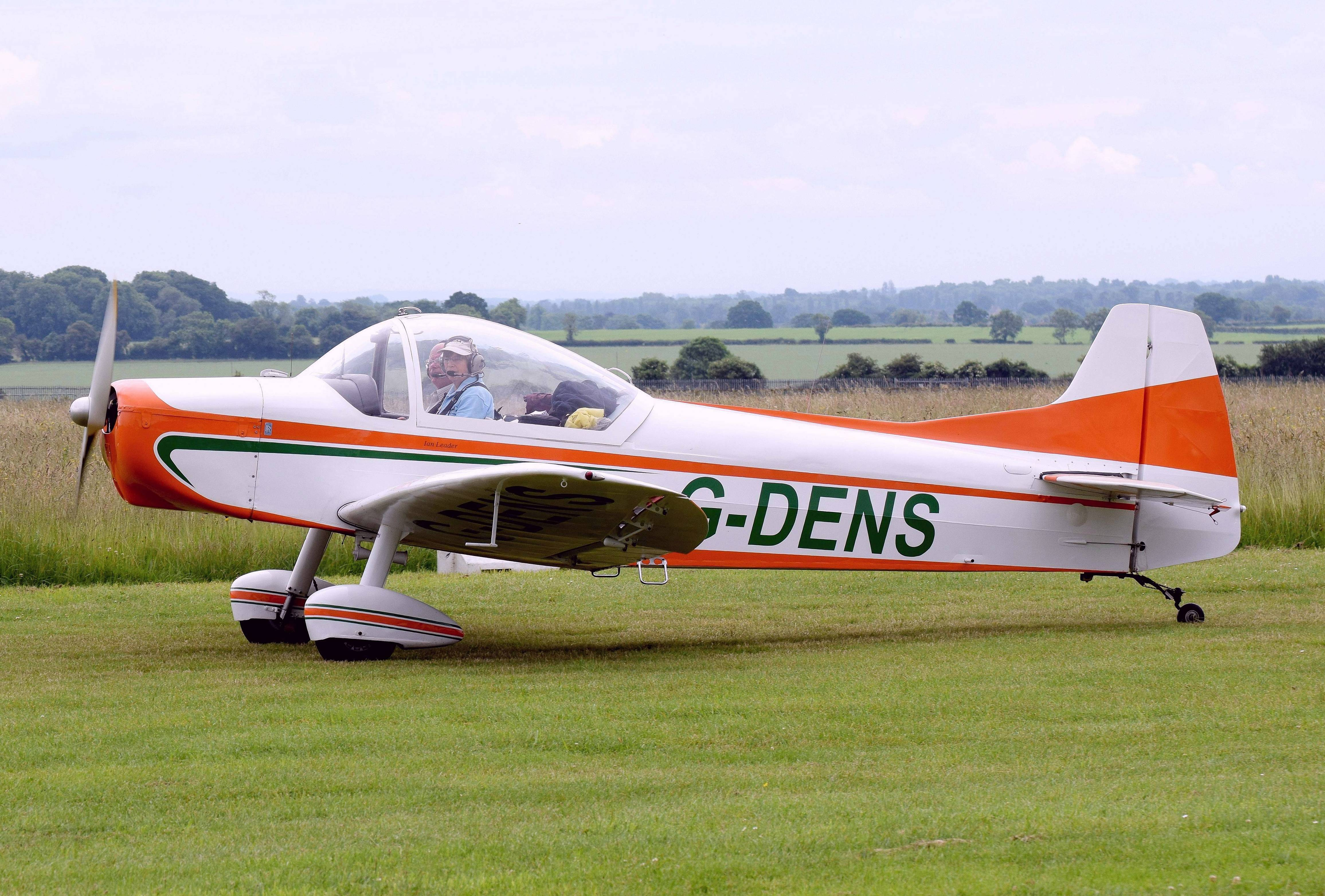
Binder Aviatik CP-301S Smaragd at Cotswold Airport, Gloucestershire, England in 2016. Built under licence, this is a deluxe version of the Piel Emeraude.

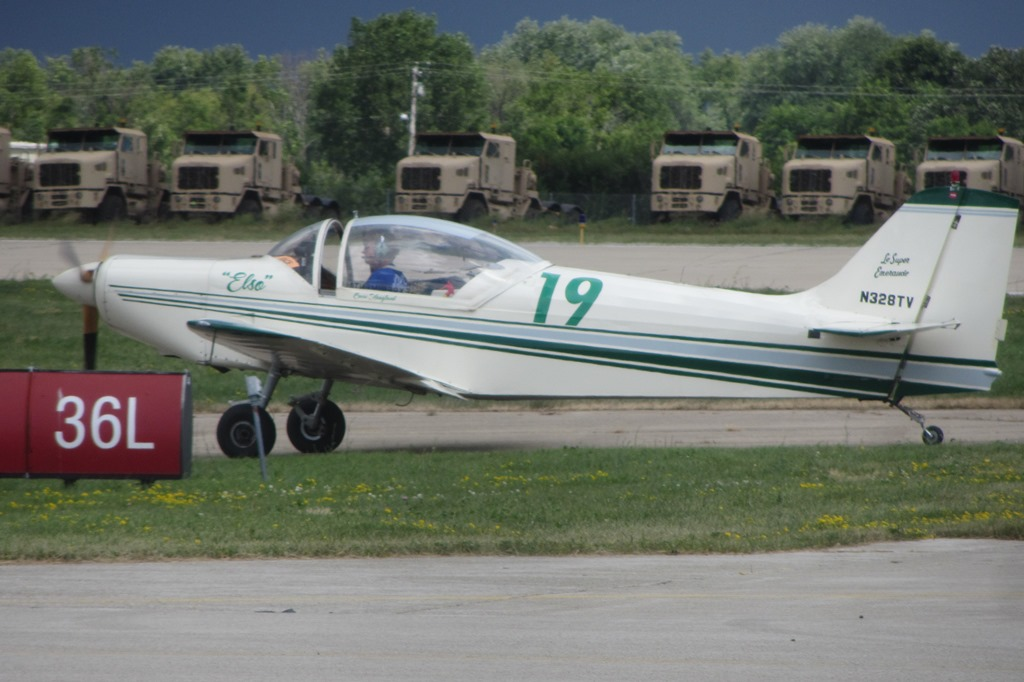
CP-1310 Super Emeraude

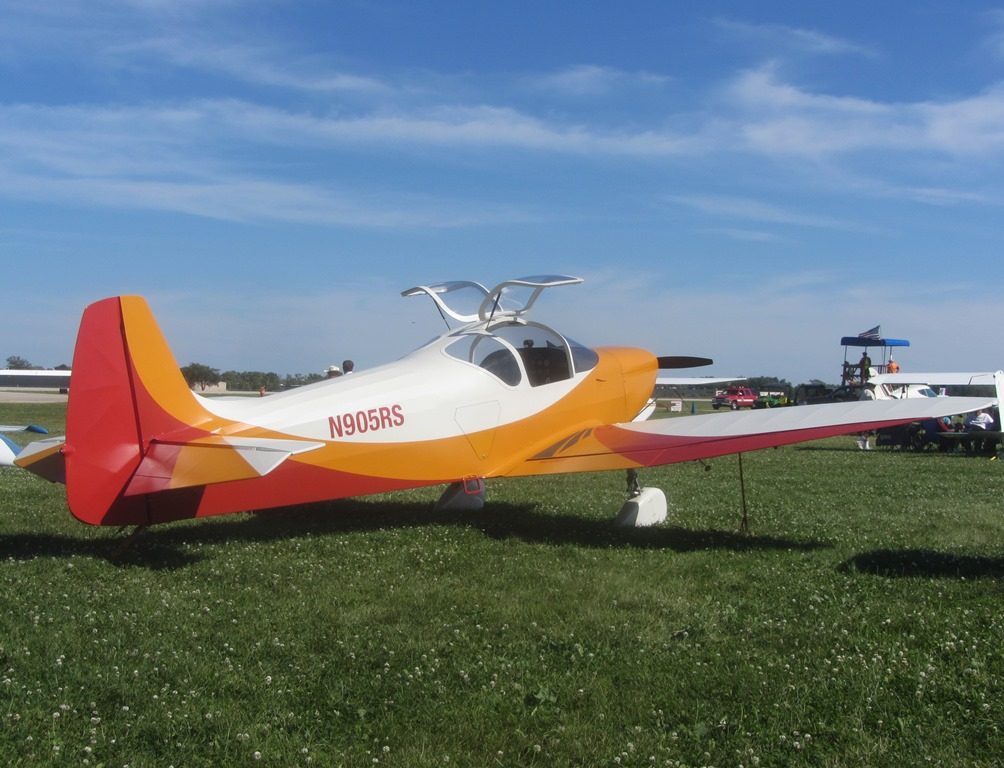
Piel Emeraude CP328A

- CP-30 – prototype with Continental A65 engine (one built)
- CP-301
  - CP-301A – initial production version with Continental C90 engine (118 built)
  - CP-301B – version by Rousseau with sliding canopy, spatted undercarriage and other refinements (23 built)
  - CP-301C – version by Scintex with bubble canopy and revised cowling, wings and tail (84 built)
  - CP-301S – Smaragd certified factory built version by Binder Aviatik KG / Schempp Hirth. Continental C90 engine, sliding canopy, upper part of rear fuselage in fibreglass including a dorsal fin and other refinements (25 built)
- CP-304 – homebuilt version with Continental C85 engine
- CP-305 homebuilt version with Lycoming O-235 engine
- CP-308
- CP-315 – this version was powered by a 78-kW (105-hp) Potez piston engine; only one CP-315 was built by Scintex Aviation.
- CP-320 – Emeraude fuselage with Super Emeraude wings
  - CP-320A – CP-320 with swept fin
- CP-321 – CP-320 with Potez engine
- CP-323 – CP-320 with 140–160 hp O-320 Lycoming engine
  - CP-323A – CP-323 with bubble canopy
- CP-324 – Emeraude Club with JPX 2100 engine
- CP-328A
- CP-1310 – Super Emeraude by Scintex with Continental O-200 (23 built)
- CP-1315 – Super Emeraude with Potez 4E engine (17 built)
- CP-1320 – Saphir the Super Emeraude with cabin and wings from Piel Diamant design
- CP-1330 – Super Emeraude with Lycoming O-235 engine

=== British production ===
Garland-Bianchi Linnet – design based on the Piel Emeraude with a 90 hp Continental C-90-14F engine, two built.
Fairtravel Linnet – further production powered by a 100 hp Rolls-Royce Continental O-200-A engines, three built.

== Specifications (Scintex C.P. 301 C1) ==
Data from Jane's All The World's Aircraft 1961–62

General characteristics

- Crew: 1
- Capacity: 1 passenger
- Length: 6.12 m (20 ft 1 in)
- Wingspan: 8.25 m (27 ft 1 in)
- Height: 2.45 m (8 ft 0 in)
- Wing area: 11.0 m^{2} (118 sq ft)
- Aspect ratio: 6.2:1
- Empty weight: 395 kg (871 lb)
- Gross weight: 650 kg (1,433 lb)
- Powerplant: 1 × Continental C90-14F air-cooled flat-four engine, 71 kW (95 hp)

Performance

- Maximum speed: 210–215 km/h (130–134 mph, 113–116 kn)
- Cruise speed: 195–200 km/h (121–124 mph, 105–108 kn) at 1,500 m (4,900 ft) (75% power)
- Range: 1,000 km (620 mi, 540 nmi) no reserves
- Service ceiling: 4,000 m (13,000 ft)
- Rate of climb: 3.0 m/s (590 ft/min)

== See also ==
Aircraft of comparable role, configuration, and era

- Jodel D-11 series
- PGK-1 Hirondelle
- Nicollier HN-700 Menestrel II
