= R7 =

R7 or R-7 may refer to:

== Military ==
- R-7 (missile), the world's first intercontinental ballistic missile, created by the Soviet Union
- R-7 (rocket family), a family of expendable space launch vehicles, created by the Soviet Union
- HMS Ark Royal (R07), a 1985 Invincible class British Royal Navy light aircraft carrier
- USS R-7 (SS-84), a 1919 R-class coastal and harbor defense submarine of the United States Navy

== Transport ==
- R7 (Belgium), the Liège ring road
- R7 Chestnut Hill East Line, a SEPTA rail route in Philadelphia, USA
- R7 expressway (Czech Republic), an expressway in Czech Republic
- R 7 (Kosovo), a motorway in Kosovo
- R7 expressway (Slovakia), a planned expressway in southern Slovakia
- R7/A (New York City Subway car), a model of rail rolling stock manufactured in 1937
- R7 (Rodalies de Catalunya), a rail line in Barcelona, Spain
- R7 Trenton, a SEPTA rail route in Philadelphia, USA
- R7 (RER Vaud), an S-Bahn line in the canton of Vaud
- R7 road (Zimbabwe), A road connecting Gweru with Mvuma
- Aserca Airlines, IATA designator R7, an airline based in Valencia, Venezuela
- Radial Road 7 or R-7, an arterial road of Manila, Philippines
- Renault 7, a sedan car
- Rising Auto R7, an electric crossover SUV
- Vashon Ranger R7, an American light-sport aircraft design
- Yamaha YZF-R7, a 1999 racing homologation motorcycle by Yamaha
- Yamaha YZF-R7 (2022 bike), a supersport motorcycle by Yamaha

== Other uses ==
- R7.com, a Brazilian news portal
- R7 (drug), a TrkB agonist under investigation for the treatment of Alzheimer's disease
- R7: May cause fire, a risk phrase in chemistry
- R7 Quad, a model of driver (golf club)
- ATC code R07, Other respiratory system products, a subgroup of the Anatomical Therapeutic Chemical Classification System
- Canon EOS R7, a 2022 mirrorless camera
- Leica R7, a 1992 film-SLR camera
- Radeon R7, a series of graphics processing units made by AMD
- School District of Webb City R-7, a school district in Jasper County, Missouri, USA
- Drosophila's R7 photoreceptor, the development of which is governed by Sevenless

== See also ==
- 7R (disambiguation)
- RRRrrrr!!!, a 2004 French comedy film
