= Carlo Francis Lombardi =

Italian World War I flying ace

Carlo Francesco Lombardi
- Born: 21 January 1897; Genoa, Kingdom of Italy
- Died: 5 March 1983 (aged 86); Vercelli, Italy
- Military career
- Allegiance: Italy
- Branch: Corpo Aeronautico Militare
- Service years: c. 1916–c. 1919
- Rank: Tenente
- Nickname: "Francis"
- Unit: 77a Squadriglia
- Awards: Three Silver awards of Medal for Military Valor, two Silver Medals for Aeronautical Valor, one Gold Medal for Aeronautical Valor
- Other work: Founded AVIA (Azionaria Vercellese Industrie Aeronautiche), designed AVIA FL.3 sport aircraft

Tenente Carlo Francesco Lombardi, known as Francis (21 January 1897 – 5 March 1983), was a World War I flying ace credited with eight aerial victories. Postwar, he was active in his family's rice refinery, as well as in record breaking flights. He formed the AVIA (Azionaria Vercellese Industrie Aeronautiche) aviation company in 1938.

== Biography ==
Carlo Francesco Lombardi was born on 21 January 1897 in Genoa, the Kingdom of Italy. He was nicknamed "Francis", and seemed to prefer that name.

As Italy entered World War I, Lombardi was posted to the Italian Army's 22nd Infantry Regiment as a reserve officer. He transferred to aviation, reporting for schooling at Venaria Reale on 18 May 1916. He trained on Blériots, then qualified on Aviatiks on 31 August 1916. On 6 October 1916, he was rated as a military pilot.

On 1 January 1917, Lombardi reported to Cascina Costa for training on Savoia-Pomilio SP.2s. He did well enough that on 14 February, he was selected as an instructor for the school. On 27 July 1917, he began fighter conversion training on the Nieuport at Malpensa's fighter school. He graduated to gunnery training at San Giusto. On 23 August 1917, he was posted to a fighter squadron, 77a Squadriglia. He flew a Nieuport 17 to a series of five victories during October and November 1917, beginning with a K-Boat flying boat on 26 October. Lombardi was awarded a Silver Medal for Military Valor for these feats. His next exploit was flying extended reconnaissance sorties 100 kilometers into Austro-Hungarian territory; it brought him a second Silver Medal for Military Valor. He used a Spad VII for two more victories in June 1918 that brought him a third award of the Medal.

Lombardi was then pulled from combat in August 1918, being reassigned to Turin's home defense squadron. When Italy launched its final, successful offensive, he returned to action, but without further results.

While Lombardi participated in Gabrielle D'Annunzio's postwar insurgency, he eventually returned to running his family's rice mill and dabbling in sport aviation. In 1928, he founded the Vercelli Gruppo Turismo Aereo (Vercelli Air Tourism Group). In 1930, he used an 85 horsepower Fiat AS.1 for three long distance flights. He flew from Rome to Mogadishu on one flight. On another, he flew from Vercelli to Tokyo, Japan. The third flight was a flight around Africa's perimeter. The first two of these flights each earned him the a Silver Medal for Aeronautical Valor.

In 1938, Carlo Lombardi founded AVIA (Azionaria Vercellese Industrie Aeronautiche). It supplied 500 AVIA FL.3 two-seater trainers for the Regia Aeronautica and various flying schools. Avia would eventually sell the FL.3 to Meteor Meteor S.p.A. and concentrate on building automobiles. In 1947 Lombardi founded the coachbuilder Francis Lombardi, which mostly made Fiat-based automobiles until they closed in 1976. Their most famous car was the Lombardi Grand Prix. Also in 1976, the Regia Aeronautica recognized Carlo Lombardi's lifetime achievements in aviation with the award of the Gold Medal for Aeronautical Valor.

When there was a reunion of World War I aces in Paris in November 1981, Lombardi attended. Carlo Francesco Lombardi died on 5 March 1983, in Vercelli.

== Sources ==
- Franks, Norman; Guest, Russell; Alegi, Gregory. Above the War Fronts: The British Two-seater Bomber Pilot and Observer Aces, the British Two-seater Fighter Observer Aces, and the Belgian, Italian, Austro-Hungarian and Russian Fighter Aces, 1914–1918: Volume 4 of Fighting Airmen of WWI Series: Volume 4 of Air Aces of WWI. Grub Street, 1997. ISBN 1-898697-56-6, ISBN 978-1-898697-56-5.
- Franks, Norman. Nieuport Aces of World War 1. Osprey Publishing, 2000. ISBN 1-85532-961-1, ISBN 978-1-85532-961-4.
- Biography from francislombardi.org
- "An Illustrated History of World War One: Italian Aces of WW1 - Carlo Lombardi". Archived from the original on 30 November 2010.
