= Damoure-Fabre DFL-6 =

1960s French aircraft

DFL-6

General information
- Type: Ultralight monoplane
- National origin: France
- Manufacturer: Damoure-Fabre

History
- First flight: 21 March 1960

The Damoure-Fabre DFL-6 was a French ultralight monoplane built in the 1960s for amateur construction.

== Variants ==
Data from:Les Avions Francais de 1944 a 1964

DFL-5
A derivative of the earlier DFL-6; One built (DFL-5 No.01 F-PKMV).
DFL-6
Light aircraft powered by a Continental C90. Two built, (No01 F-WJCQ and No02 F-PPPG)

== Specifications ==
Data from Aviafrance : Damoure-Fabre DFL-6, Avions Francais de 1944a 1964

General characteristics

- Crew: 2
- Length: 6.19 m (20 ft 4 in)
- Wingspan: 8.26 m (27 ft 1 in)
- Wing area: 12 m^{2} (130 sq ft)
- Empty weight: 340 kg (750 lb)
- Gross weight: 578 kg (1,274 lb)
- Powerplant: 1 × Continental C90 4-cylinder air-cooled horizontally-opposed piston engine, 67 kW (90 hp)
- Propellers: 2-bladed fixed-pitch propeller

Performance

- Maximum speed: 215 km/h (134 mph, 116 kn)
- Cruise speed: 190 km/h (120 mph, 100 kn)
- Range: 1,100 km (680 mi, 590 nmi)
- Service ceiling: 1,000 m (3,300 ft)
