= Giannini Automobili =

Italian tuning company

Società Meccanica Industriale Giannini Automobili S.p.A.
- Founded: Rome, (March 21, 1885)
- Founder: Attilio & Domenico Giannini
- Headquarters: Rome, Italy
- Products: Automotive
- Operating income: € 1,795,000 (2007)
- Website: www.gianniniautomobili.com

Giannini Automobili S.p.A. is an Italian tuning company and a former producer of cars. Their focus has mainly been on Fiat cars. It was founded in 1920 by brothers Attilio and Domenico Giannini. The company headquarters are in Rome, Italy.

== History ==
=== Origins ===
Founded in 1885 as a garage, in 1922 Giannini became part of Itala's service network. Through this collaboration and the skills acquired thereby, Giannini was able to enter and win its class with an Itala Tipo 61 in the first edition of the Mille Miglia (1927), commissioned by Marquis Pellegrini.

=== 1930s ===
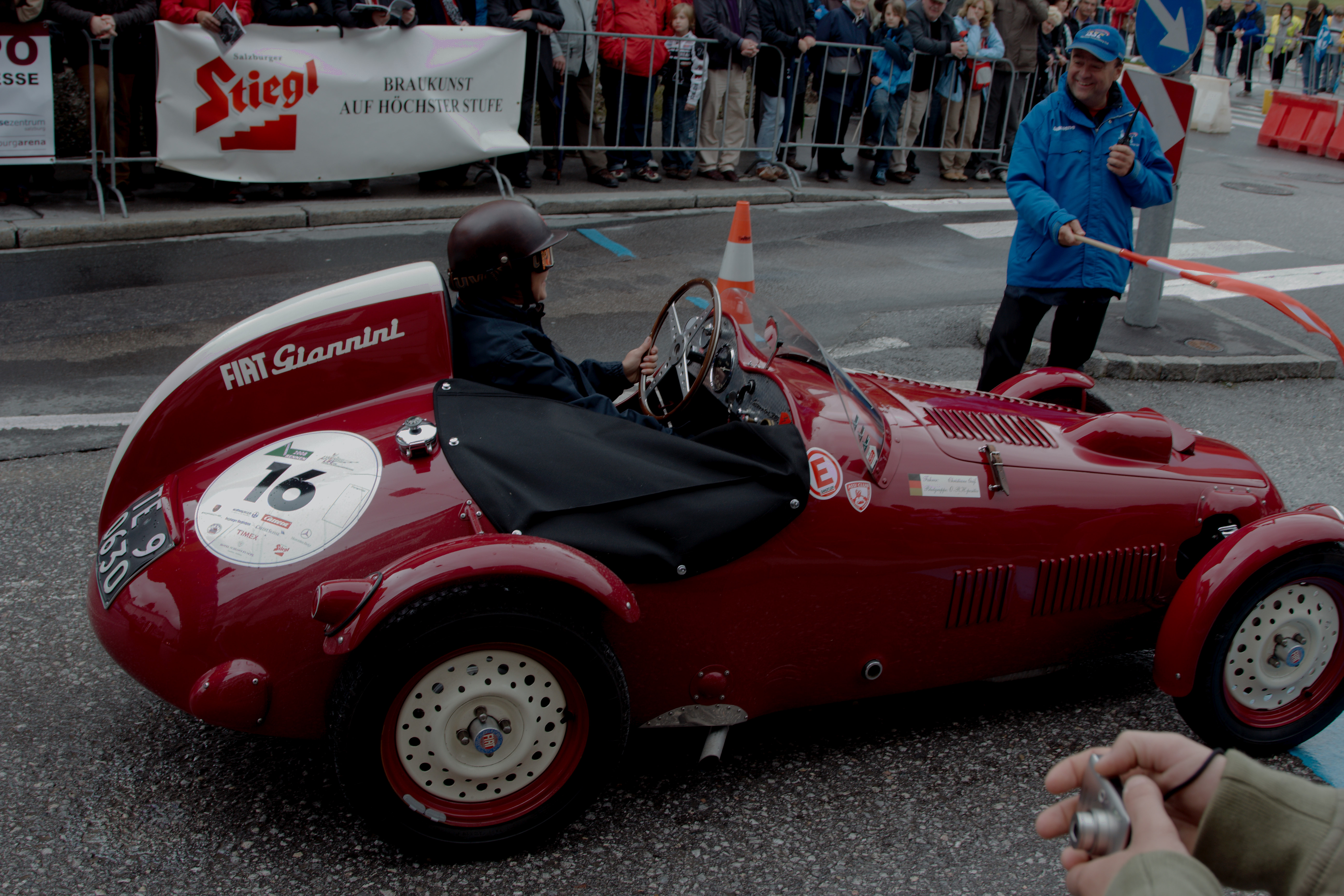
1939 Fiat Giannini 500A-based racer

Giannini expanded their scope during the 1930s by working on smaller cars, in particular the popular Fiat 500 "Topolino". In addition to engine modifications, the brake arrangements were also changed. In 1938 Giannini broke a number of world records with a single seat racer powered by one of these 499 cc engines, equipped with a Siata head.

=== 1940s ===
After World War II, the Giannini brothers began building their own engines. In 1947 they built a three-cylinder direct injection diesel truck engine, called the "3A". This produced 40 PS (29 kW) at 3,000 rpm. It was not a huge success, only selling a few hundred.

In 1948, the Giannini brothers abandoned the transport sector, preferring instead to focus on something closer to their hearts: competition. Building on over a decade's experience with Topolino engines and with the aid of young engineer Carlo Gianini (sic), who began the CNA Rondine motorcycle project, the 750 cc "G1" engine was developed. The G1 met with considerable success at the 1949 Mille Miglia. Gianini then developed the twin-cam "G2" engine which saw use in the Giaur, an acronym for Giannini and Urania. The Giaur project was codeveloped with Berardo Taraschi. Giannini engines were also used by other "Etceterinis" such as Gilco and Stanga. The G2 powered Giannini's entry in the 1950 Mille Miglia, which led to a class victory in the hands of Maggiorelli and Magior.

=== 1950s ===
In the 1950s Giannini opened a number of new ventures across Italy, such as Fiat sales outlets and garages.

=== Division ===
For various reasons, and in spite of good sales, the company found itself in serious financial difficulties which led to its closing in 1961. The two brothers and their children disagreed on which direction to take and thus created two new separate companies: Attilio's Costruzioni Meccaniche Giannini S.p.A. (Attilio) and Domenico's Giannini Automobili S.p.A.

== Costruzioni Meccaniche Giannini S.p.A. ==
Costruzioni Meccaniche Giannini S.p.A. focused on the field of conceptualizing, designing, and engineering prototypes and engines, abandoning entirely service and maintenance. This choice, despite much excellent work, was to prove fatal to the company. Attilio's Costruzioni Meccaniche Giannini was to close for good in 1971.

== Giannini Automobili S.p.A. ==
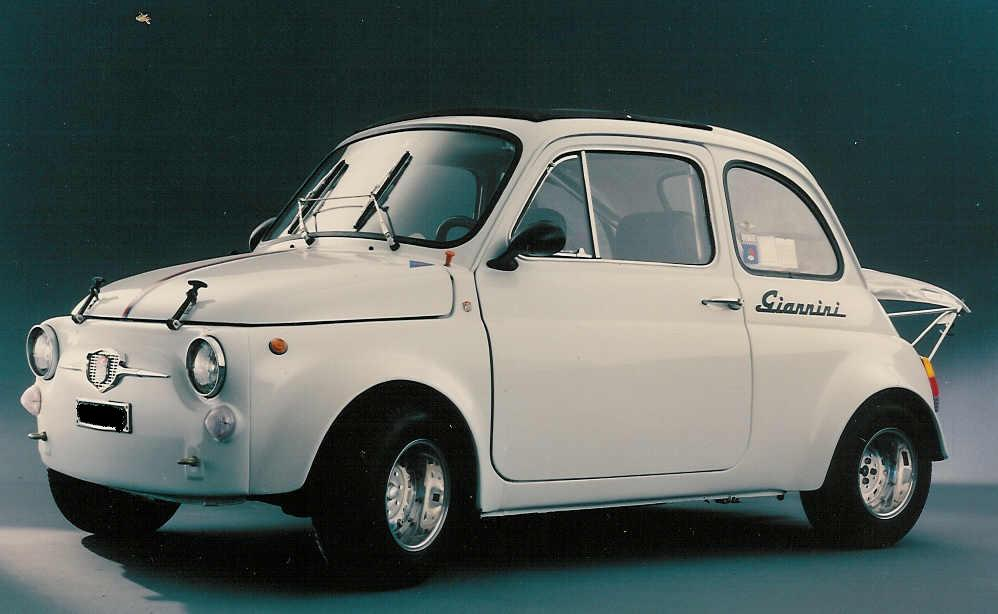
Giannini 590 GT

Giannini Automobili S.p.A. retained Giannini's distribution network and series of repair shops. Customization work was drastically curtailed, now consisting only of minor surgery. In 1963 Domenico began modifying standard cars and selling conversion kits: in the same year the "500 TV", Giannini's tuned version of the tiny Fiat 500, was also presented. Abarth's more famous "595" appeared in the same year. Other models were also produced during the 1960s, nearly all on Fiat basis. The 1960s were good years for the company, both in terms of tuning work and race participation, marred somewhat by Domenico Giannini's 16 March 1967 death of a heart attack.

Giannini entered a partnership with tiny Carrozzeria Francis Lombardi in 1969, in order to produce a tuned up version of Lombardi's little Grand Prix coupé for export markets. The resulting company, OTAS, only lasted until 1971 following homologation issues in the United States.

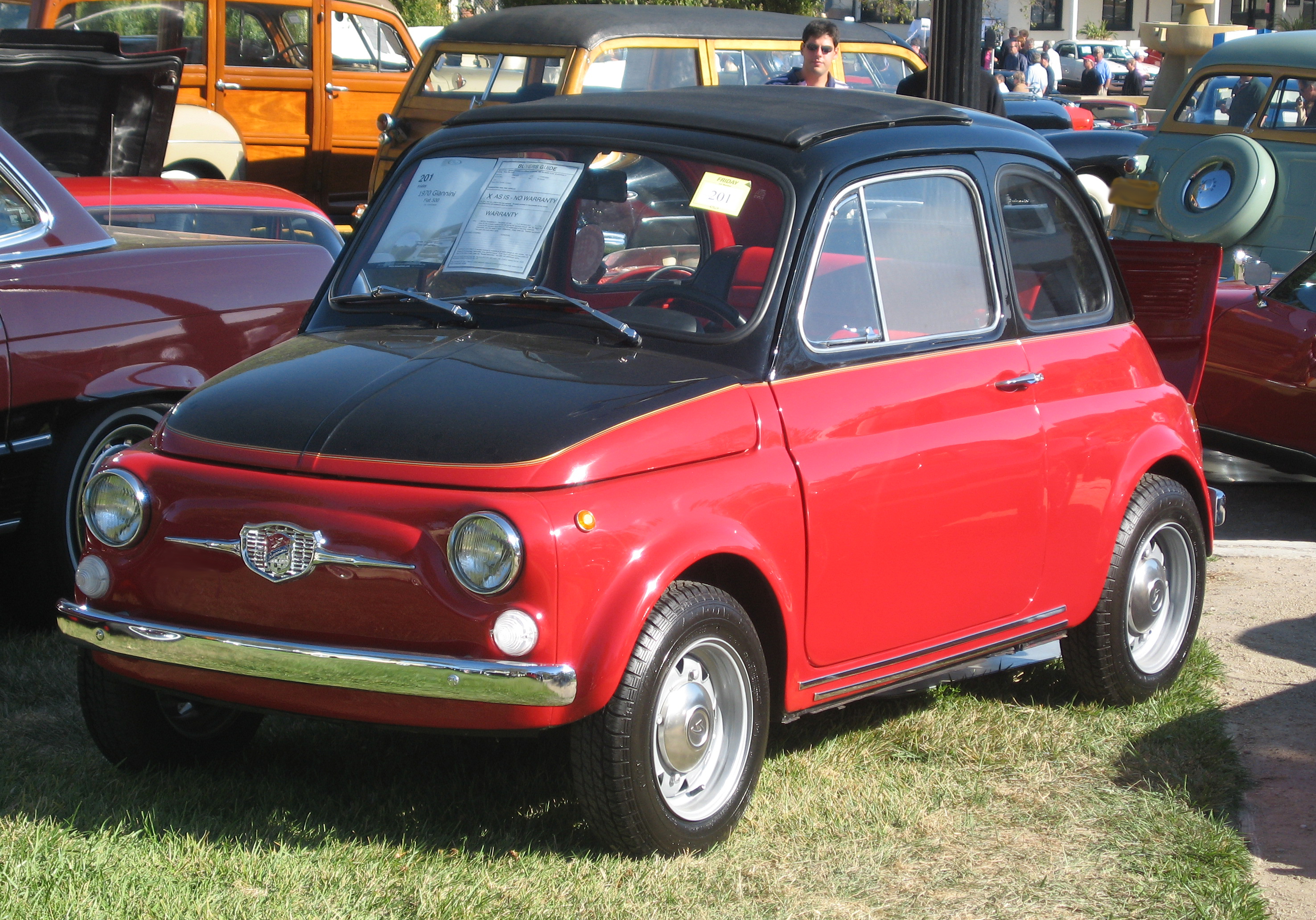
1970 Fiat Giannini 500

=== Volfango Polverelli enters ===
After the death of Domenico Giannini a new somewhat troubled period commenced for the house. The problems were largely of management and organization, leading the company directors to call in an outsider to straighten out the company, in the form of lawyer Volfango Polverelli. While reluctant to take on the job, a love for automobiles made him ever more involved until he took sole ownership of the company in 1973. New ownership also brought changes, Volfango putting his three sons in charge of various departments. A new engineer, Armando Palanca, with experience in aeronautic as well as automotive engineering, created a new direction for Giannini in the early 1980s. Tuning kits for new Fiats like the 126, Ritmo, and the Panda appeared, and Giannini partook (directly and indirectly) in lots of competitions. The two-cylinder engine used in the 126 and Panda ("Panda 750 Sport") was enlarged to 694 and 756 cc to make for slightly more powerful but still cheap to own versions. The 1.7 litre diesel engine used in the Ritmo and the Regata was offered with a turbocharger, raising power by 34 percent to 78 PS (57 kW). The 903 cc, 45 PS Uno was also available with a turbocharger, as such offering 79 PS (58 kW). All of the tuned Giannini models were also modified in terms of appearance, for an overall sportier look.

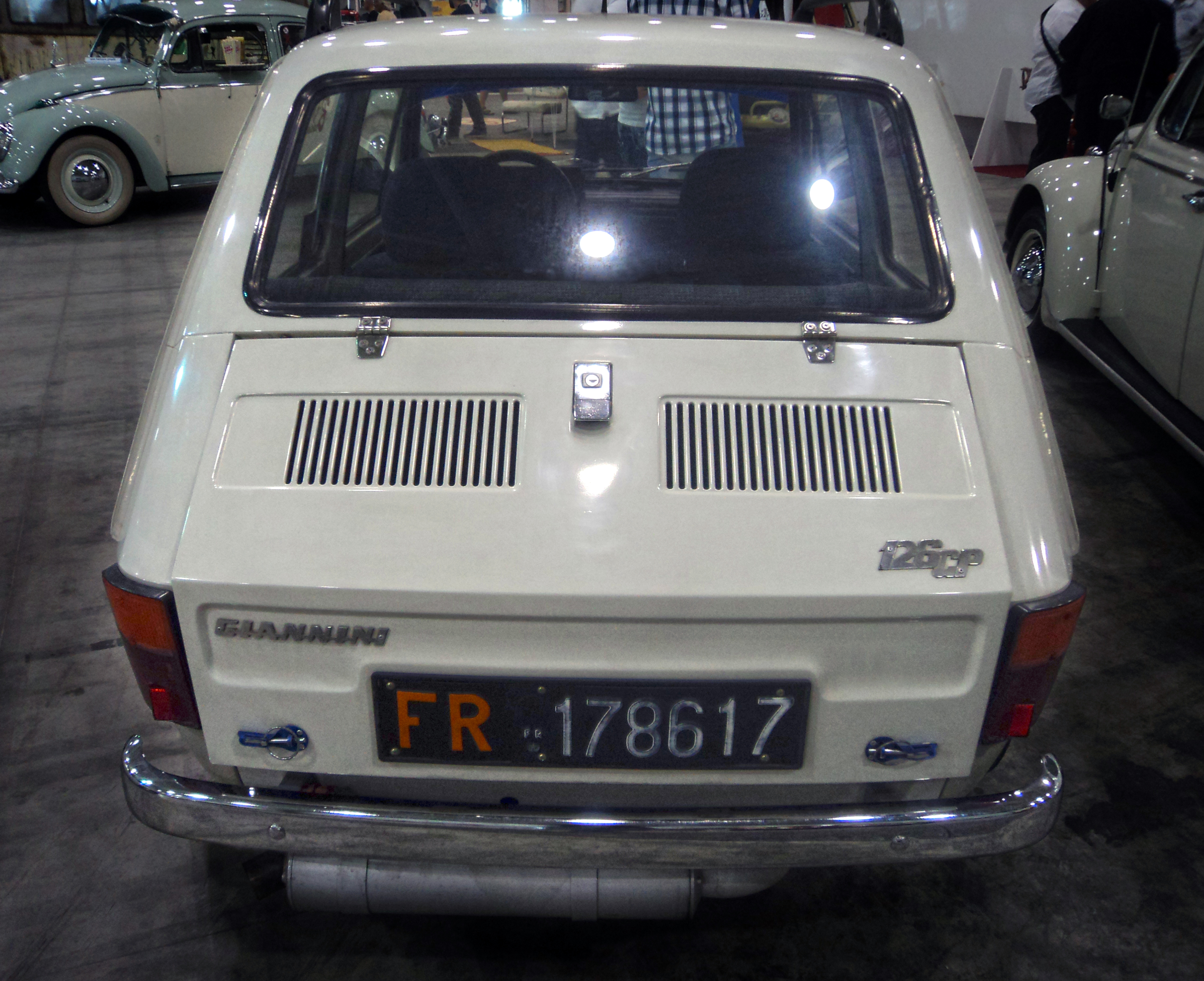
Giannini 126 GP

However, Italy's tuning corporations had a hard time in the 1980s. In addition to ever rising costs, companies now made their own sporting models of family cars. To compound the financial troubles, Volfango Polverelli died with respiratory troubles on 13 July 1984. To resolve the crisis, in 1985 Giannini decided to stop creating and modifying bodywork, henceforth focusing on "personalizing" cars such as the Uno, Tipo, and the Panda. This, the "Look" program, mainly consisted of more luxurious upholstery, paintjobs, and equipment, although there were also modified bumpers and wings.

The Uno was available as the "Uno 45SL Look" from 1986. By 1990 the line was divided into "Prestige" and "Topline" (now available with any engine from the Uno lineup), with both versions receiving special Giannini paintjobs and upgraded interiors. The Topline also has aluminium wheels, foglights, leather interior, power locks and other extras.

== Giannini today ==
Today Giannini works directly with Fiat, primarily being responsible for after-sales service work in the Italian market. Giannini also has a long standing relationship creating special vehicles for the Guardia di Finanza and Italy's Ministry of the Interior and since 1996 is a member of the Associazone Nazionale Filiera Industria Automobilistica the (Italian Association of the Automotive Industry) Coachbuilders Group.

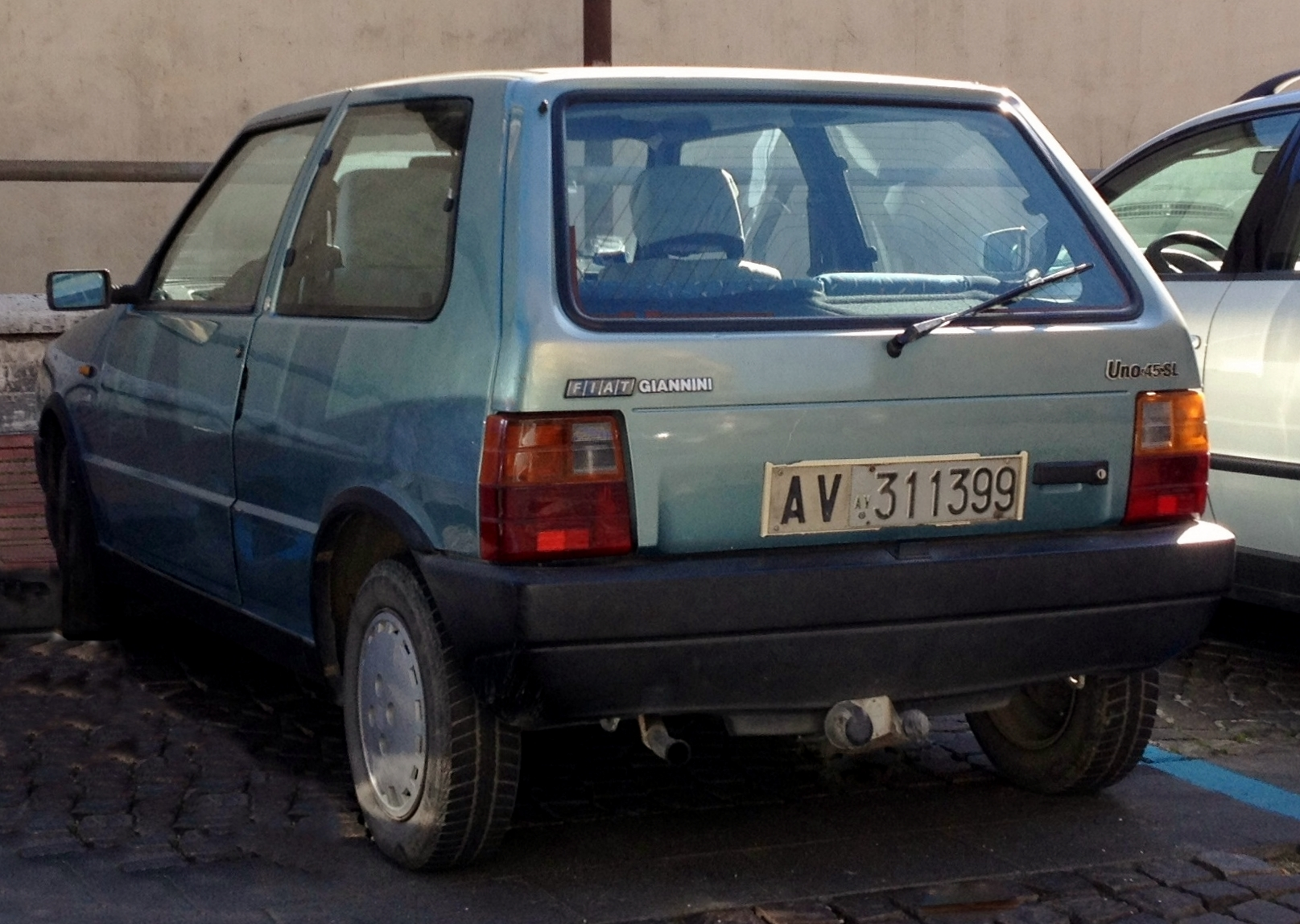
Fiat Uno 45 SL Look

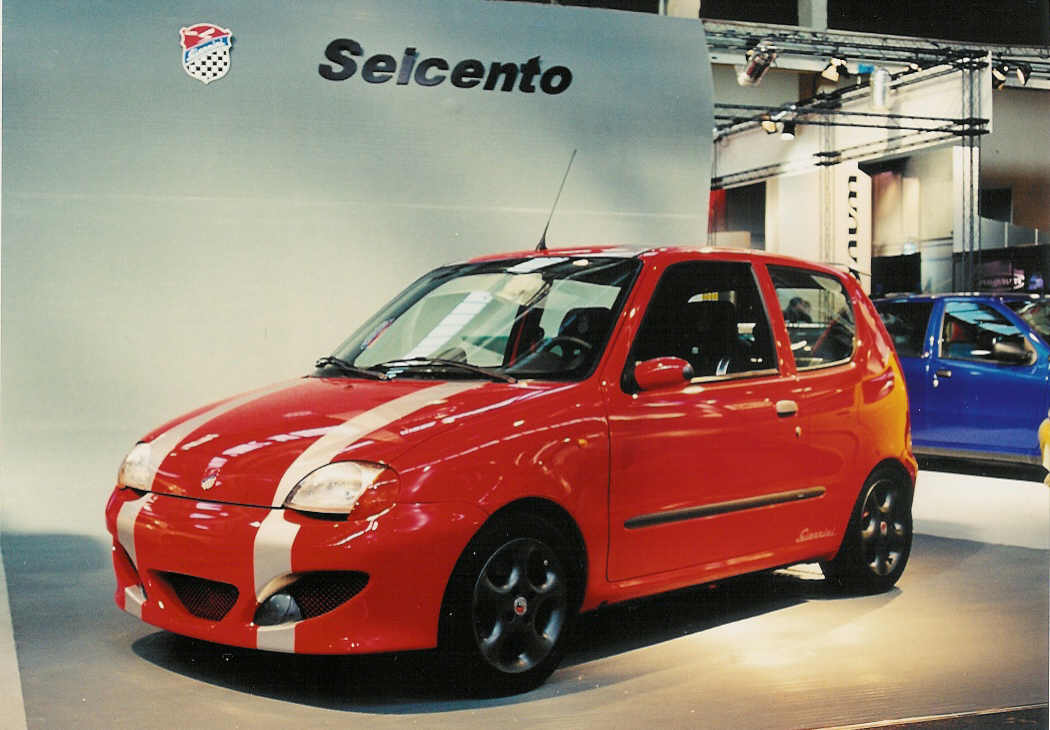
Giannini Seicento Sportline GT

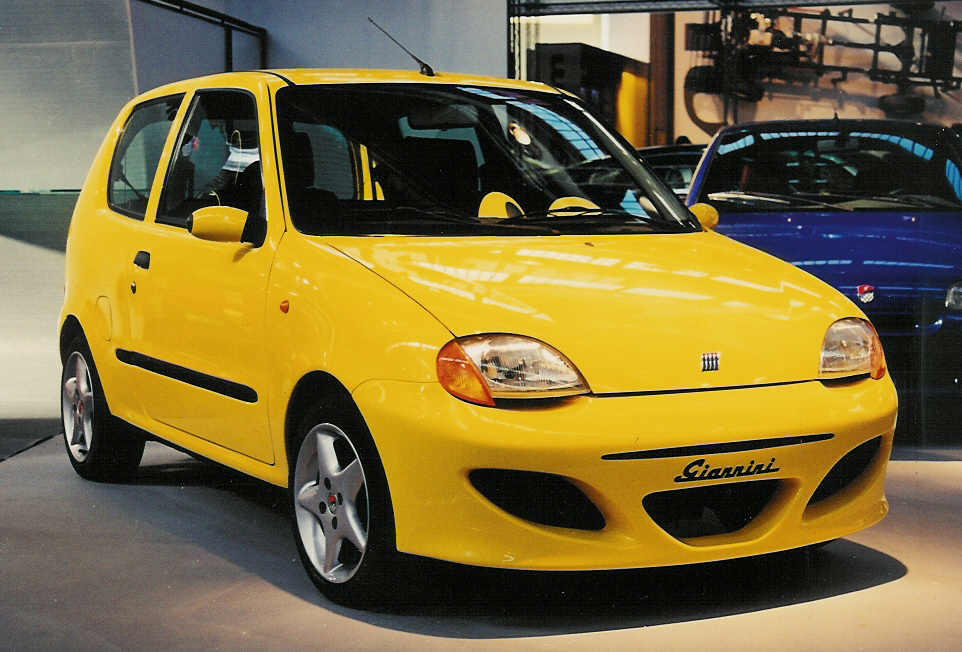
Giannini Seicento Sportline GT

== Giannini in motor sport ==
Cars modified by Giannini were a constant presence on Italian racecourses in the 1960s, 1970s, and 1980s, as this was why they had been developed. In the 1960s, Giannini had an exciting rivalry with Abarth, both entering modified Fiat 500s. Giannini, however, always played second fiddle to the more famous "scorpions".

In 1983 and 1984 Giannini won two World Endurance Championships, in the C-Junior category. In reality, this was merely a ploy to allow Carma, a tiny engine manufacturer, to join Sportscar racing. Entry was reserved to manufacturers recognized by the FIA, which is why Giannini lent their name to Facetti and Finotto, the men behind Carma. While the turbocharged 1.4-litre four-cylinder was labelled "Giannini", there was no actual involvement from the Roman company.

== Main Giannini products ==
- 750 Sport
- 500 TV berlina
- 500 GT berlina
- 750 TV berlina
- 850 S berlina
- 124 S berlina
- 128 NP
- 128 NPS
- 128 NP Rally
- 128 Rally 1600
- 127 NP
- 127 NPS
- 126 GP 650
- 126 GPS 700
- 126 GPA 800
- 132 2000
- Uno 45 S Turbo
- Regata Turbodiesel
