= AVIA FL.3 =

AVIA/Lombardi FL.3
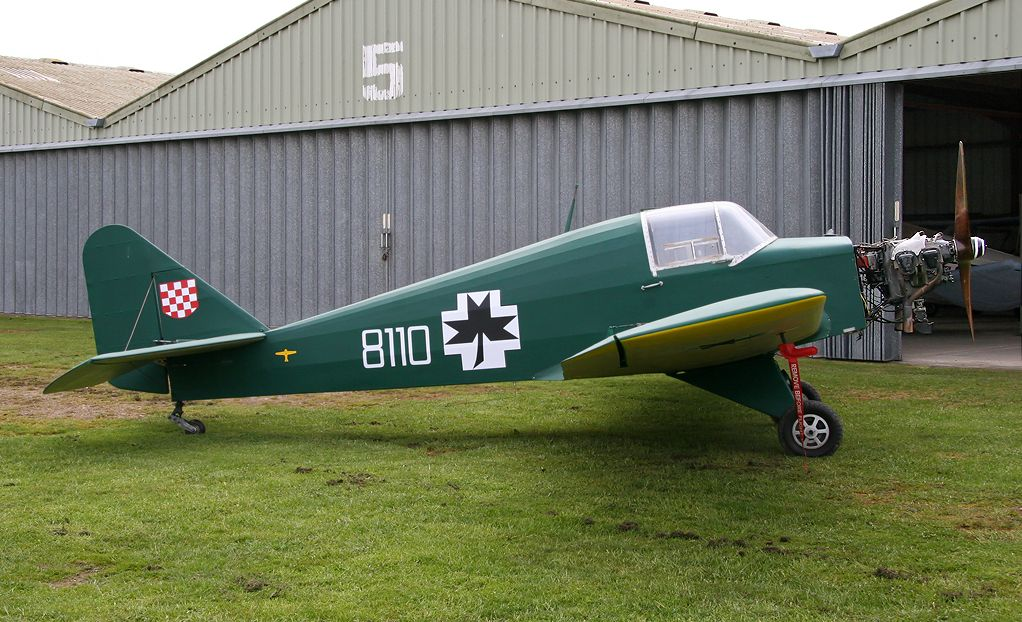

General information
- Type: Two-seat cabin monoplane
- Manufacturer: Azionaria Vercellese Industrie Aeronautiche (AVIA); Lombardi
- Designer: Francis Lombardi
- Number built: 335 + 1 prototype

History
- First flight: 1939

The AVIA FL.3 (also later known as the Lombardi FL.3) was an Italian two-seat cabin monoplane designed and built by Azionaria Vercellese Industrie Aeronautiche (AVIA) who were later taken over by Lombardi in 1947.

== Development ==
The FL.3 was a simple low-wing cantilever monoplane with fixed landing gear and powered by an 85 hp (63 kW) Continental C-85 engine. It had room for a pilot and passenger sitting side-by-side and could either have an open or enclosed cockpit. The first aircraft flew in 1939 and production was started, but ended temporarily when the Second World War started.

Production resumed after the war and in 1947 the company was taken over by Lombardi. Over 700 aircraft had been built by AVIA and Lombardi when production stopped in 1948.

In 1953 Meteor SpA acquired the rights for the FL.3 and with some re-design produced it as the Meteor FL.53 and this was followed by a three-seat version the FL.54 powered by a 135 hp Lycoming engine. A four-seat version the FL.55 was also produced powered by either a 150 hp (112 kW) or 180 hp (134 kW) Lycoming engine.

== Variants ==
AVIA FL.3
Production version by AVIA powered by a 60 hp (45 kW) CNA D.4 engine.
Lombardi FL.3
Production version by Lombardi.
Meteor FL.53
Modified version built by Meteor powered by a 65 hp (48 kW) Continental engine, eight built.
Meteor FL.53BM
FL.53 with a 90 hp (67 kW) Continental engine, four built.

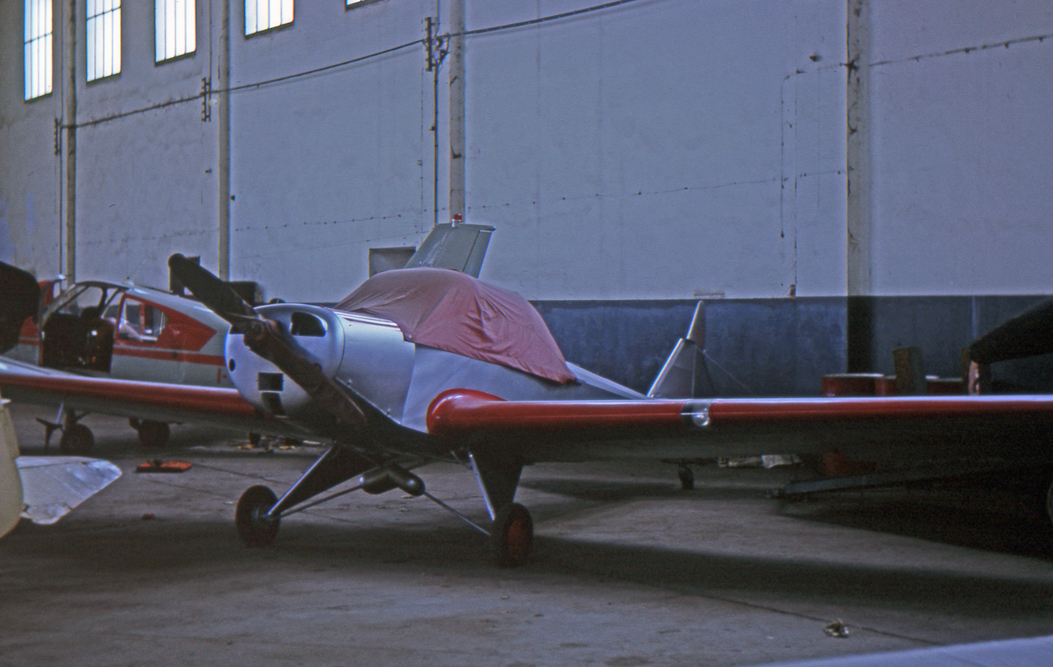
Meteor FL54 three-seat variant at Milan (Bresso) airport in 1965

Meteor FL.54
Three-seat variant powered by a 90 hp (67 kW) Continental C90-12F engine, 10 built by Meteor.
Meteor FL.55
Four-seat variant powered by 135 hp (100 kW) Lycoming engine, four built by Meteor.
Meteor FL.55BM
FL.55 powered by a 150 hp (112 kW) Lycoming engine, ten built by Meteor.
Meteor FL.55CM
FL.55 powered by a 180 hp (130 kW) Lycoming engine, one built by Meteor.
Meteor Super
The Super was a four-seat FL.55 with enlarged vertical tail and a 220 hp Meteor Alfa 4 engine, one built.
Meteor Bis
The Bis was a two-seat variant of the Super fitted with a 110 hp Meteor Alfa 2 engine.

== Operators ==
Croatia

- Zrakoplovstvo Nezavisne Države Hrvatske

Germany

- Luftwaffe operated captured aircraft.

Kingdom of Italy

- Regia Aeronautica
- Italian Co-Belligerent Air Force

Italy

- Aeronautica Nazionale Repubblicana

Italy

- Italian Air Force

== Specifications (FL.3) ==
Data from The Illustrated Encyclopedia of Aircraft (Part Work 1982-1985), 1985, Orbis Publishing, Page 2380

General characteristics

- Capacity: 2-seat
- Length: 6.35 m (20 ft 10 in)
- Wingspan: 9.85 m (32 ft 3.75 in)
- Height: 1.70 m (5 ft 7 in)
- Wing area: 14.35 m^{2} (154.47 sq ft)
- Empty weight: 340 kg (750 lb)
- Gross weight: 570 kg (1,257 lb)
- Powerplant: 1 × Continental C-85 flat-four piston , 63 kW (85 hp)

Performance

- Maximum speed: 195 km/h (121 mph, 105 kn)
- Range: 555 km (342 mi, 297 nmi)
- Service ceiling: 6,000 m (20,000 ft)

== See also ==
Related lists

- List of aircraft of World War II
