= 7R =

7R may refer to:

- Kawasaki Ninja ZX-7R, a supersports bike
- KRCR-TV, a television station in Redding, California that used the branding of "7R" in the past for its designation in TV Guide listings
- RusLine, IATA airline designator
- Sony α7R, a full-frame E-mount digital mirrorless camera
- Yaesu VX-7R, a handheld amateur radio transceiver

== See also ==
- R7 (disambiguation)
- RRRrrrr!!!, a 2004 French comedy film
