= Miller-Bohannon JM-2 Special =

JM-2 Special
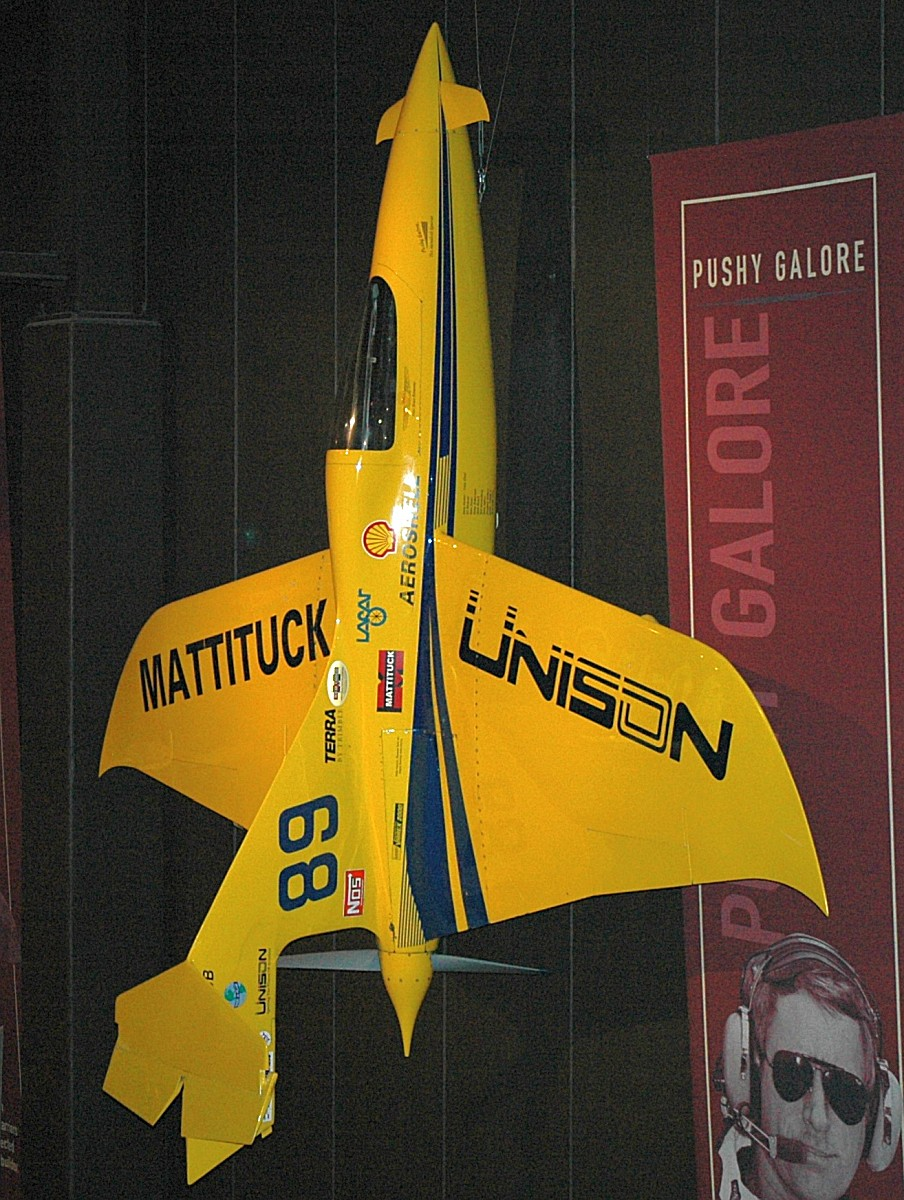

General information
- Type: Homebuilt Formula One Air Racing aircraft
- National origin: United States
- Manufacturer: Bruce Bohannon
- Designer: Jim W Miller and Bruce Bohannon
- Status: Sole example in the AirVenture Museum
- Number built: One

History
- First flight: Early 1989
- Retired: 1996
- Developed from: Miller JM-2

The Miller-Bohannon JM-2 Special, named Pushy Galore, is a one-of-a-kind American homebuilt Formula One racing and record-setting aircraft. It was based upon Jim W Miller's Miller JM-2 design, highly modified by Bruce Bohannon.

== Design and development ==
Bohannon began construction of Pushy Galore in 1988 and first flew it in the early part of 1989, first entering it in a race in June 1989.

The aircraft is of three-surface configuration, having a cantilever mid-wing, a single-seat enclosed cockpit under a bubble canopy, fixed main tricycle landing gear with a retractable nose wheel, a t-tail and a nose-mounted canard. It is powered by a single rear-mounted engine in pusher configuration.

The aircraft is made from welded steel tubing covered in molded carbon fiber. As required by the Formula One rules, its engine is a 100 hp (75 kW) Continental O-200A.

Only one example was ever built.

== Operational history ==
Bohannon entered the aircraft in the Reno Air Races in 1994, qualifying in third place in the Formula One class, with a speed of 236.153 mph (380.051 km/h).

In 1995 Bohannon flew the aircraft to second place in the Formula One Gold championship race at Reno, Nevada.

Bohannon also used the aircraft to set world time-to-climb records in the Fédération Aéronautique Internationale (FAI) C-1.A class. At AirVenture 1994 Bohannon set a new world time-to-climb record, climbing to 6,000 m (19,685 ft) in 12 minutes and 50 seconds. In January 1996, Bohannon climbed the aircraft to 9,000 m (29,528 ft) in 41 minutes and 35 seconds, setting class world time-to-climb, absolute altitude and altitude in horizontal flight records. In July 1996 at AirVenture in Oshkosh, Bohannon set a third FAI class time-to-climb record of 3,000 m (9,843 ft) in three minutes and eight seconds.

After the climb records were set in 1996, Bohannon retired the aircraft and in 1998 donated it to the AirVenture Museum. Bohannon later went on to set many more time-to-climb records in his successor to Pushy Galore, the Bohannon B-1.

== Aircraft on display ==
- AirVenture Museum – The sole example built was donated to the museum in 1998.

== Specifications (JM-2 Special Pushy Galore) ==
Data from AirVenture Museum

General characteristics

- Crew: one
- Length: 17 ft 2 in (5.23 m)
- Wingspan: 18 ft 5 in (5.61 m)
- Height: 6 ft 3 in (1.91 m)
- Gross weight: 941 lb (427 kg)
- Powerplant: 1 × Continental O-200A four cylinder, air-cooled, four stroke aircraft engine, 100 hp (75 kW)

Performance

- Maximum speed: 250 mph (400 km/h, 220 kn)
