= Bohannon B-1 =

American homebuilt record-setting aircraft

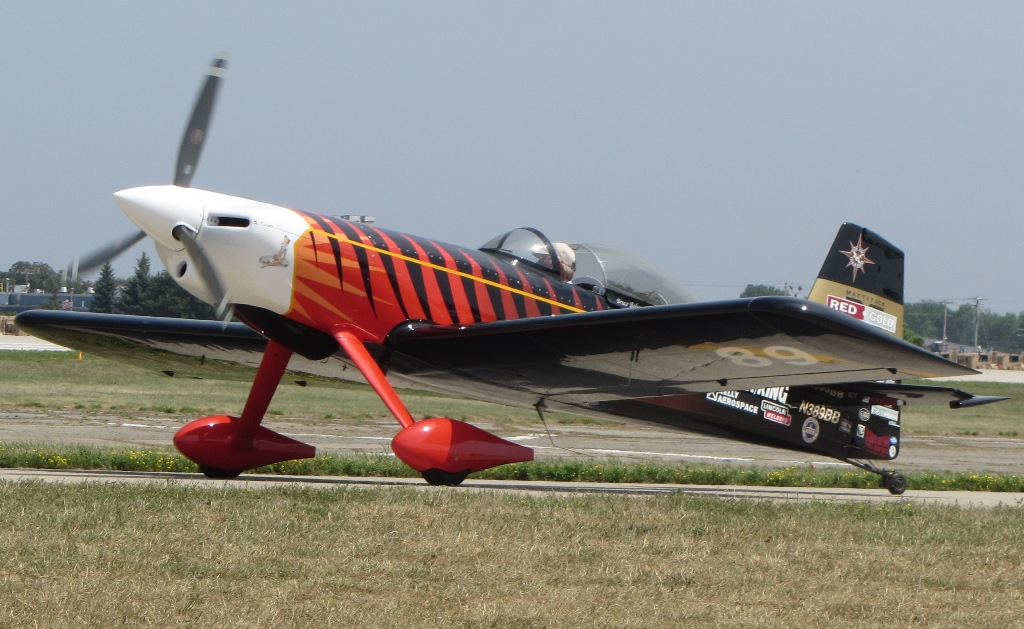

General information
- Type: Homebuilt aircraft
- National origin: United States
- Designer: Bruce Bohannon
- Number built: 1

History
- Developed from: Van's RV-4

The Bohannon B-1 is a purpose-built aircraft to set new world records in its class for time-to-climb. It is a development of the Van's RV-4.

== Development ==
Bohannon and Miller built the Miller-Bohannon JM-2 Pushy Galore to set the new time to climb records and compete in Formula One air racing. Bohannon continued to set records with his new aircraft. He acquired Exxon as a sponsor for record attempts. His B-1 was painted in a stylized tiger paint scheme and named the "Exxon Flyin' Tiger". The aircraft went on to set 30 altitude and time to climb records.

== Design ==
The Bohannon B-1 is a low-wing, all-metal single-seat aircraft with conventional landing gear. The Lycoming IO-540 engine is augmented with nitrous oxide to increase power from 260 to 425 hp (194 to 317 kW). For 2001 attempts, a Lycoming IO-555 was installed.

== Operational history ==
The B-1 has set, and beat, its own records several times. The B-1 operates in the FAI C-1b Class. (Piston aircraft 1,102 to 2,205 lb (500 to 1,000 kg)).

- 1999 - Time to climb to 3,000 m (9,843 ft) in 2 minutes, 20 seconds.
- 2000 - Time to climb to 6,000 m (19,685 ft) in 6 minutes, 37 seconds.
- 2001 - Absolute ceiling for a piston engine aircraft - 35,000 ft (10,668 m).
- 2002 - Absolute ceiling - 37,536 ft (11,441 m)
- 2002 - Time to climb to 12,000 m (39,370 ft) in 32 minutes, 2 seconds
- 2002 - Absolute ceiling - 41,300 ft (12,588 m).
- 2003 - Absolute ceiling - 47,067 ft (14 346 m)

== Specifications (Bohannon B-1) ==
Data from Sport Aviation

General characteristics

- Crew: 1
- Powerplant: 1 × Lycoming IO-540 horizontally opposed piston, 425 hp (317 kW)
- Propellers: 3-bladed Hartzell

Performance

- Cruise speed: 210 kn (240 mph, 390 km/h)
- Rate of climb: 4,407 ft/min (22.39 m/s) 1999 time to climb record

== See also ==
Related development

- Van's RV-4
