= Miller JM-2 =

American homebuilt racing aircraft

JM-2
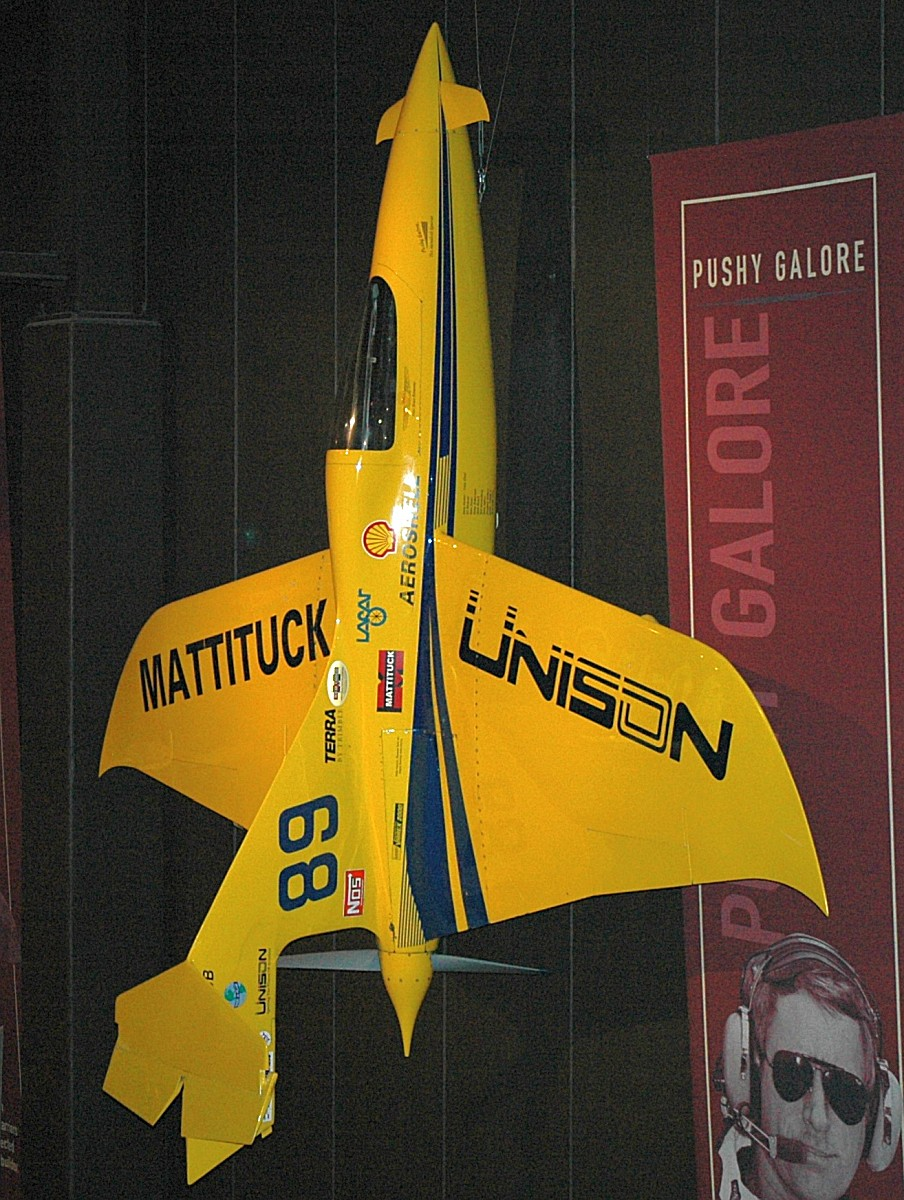

General information
- Type: Homebuilt air racer
- National origin: United States
- Manufacturer: JW Miller Aviation
- Designer: Jim W Miller
- Status: Production completed

History
- Variant: Miller-Bohannon JM-2 Pushy Galore

The Miller JM-2 was an American Formula One Air Racing homebuilt aircraft that was designed by Jim W Miller and produced by JW Miller Aviation of Marble Falls, Texas. When it was available, the aircraft was supplied in the form of plans for construction by amateurs.

== Design and development ==
Miller opted for an unorthodox configuration in developing a racing aircraft that would be as fast as possible on 100 hp (75 kW). The JM-2 features a cantilever mid-wing, a single-seat enclosed open cockpit under a bubble canopy, tricycle landing gear with fixed main wheels and a retractable nose wheel, and a single engine in pusher configuration, mounted within a fan shroud, with the spinner acting as the aircraft's tailcone. The fan shroud structure provides a place to mount the rudders and the tailplane is mounted high in T-tail configuration as an extension of the shroud. There is a small canard surface mounted on the nose.

The aircraft is of mixed construction, with the fuselage made from four fiberglass panels and the 15.0 ft (4.6 m) span wing covered in fiberglass and resin-reinforced honeycomb material. As required by the Formula One rules, the engine used was a 100 hp (75 kW) Continental O-200B powerplant, the "B" being the pusher-configured version of the engine.

The JM-2 has an empty weight of 630 lb (290 kg) and a gross weight of 1,100 lb (500 kg), giving a useful load of 470 lb (210 kg). With full fuel of 12 U.S. gallons (45 L; 10.0 imp gal) the payload is 398 lb (181 kg).

The JM-2 was further developed into the one-of-a-kind racing aircraft, the Miller-Bohannon JM-2 Pushy Galore.

== Operational history ==
By October 2013, three examples had been registered in the United States with the Federal Aviation Administration including the sole Miller-Bohannon JM-2 Pushy Galore. None of the aircraft remain registered.

One of the two stock JM-2s built was destroyed while racing in the Reno Air Races at Reno, Nevada on 15 September 1989, when it flew through a dust devil and broke up in flight, killing the pilot.

== Specifications (JM-2) ==
Data from Plane and Pilot

General characteristics

- Crew: one
- Length: 19 ft 0 in (5.79 m)
- Wingspan: 15 ft 0 in (4.57 m)
- Empty weight: 630 lb (286 kg)
- Gross weight: 1,100 lb (499 kg)
- Fuel capacity: 12 U.S. gallons (45 L; 10.0 imp gal)
- Powerplant: 1 × Continental O-200B four cylinder, air-cooled, four stroke aircraft engine, 100 hp (75 kW)
- Propellers: 4-bladed fan mounted in a ducted shroud

Performance

- Maximum speed: 235 mph (378 km/h, 204 kn)
- Cruise speed: 190 mph (310 km/h, 170 kn)
- Stall speed: 70 mph (110 km/h, 61 kn)
- Range: 300 mi (480 km, 260 nmi)
- Rate of climb: 1,600 ft/min (8.1 m/s)
