= Lombardi Grand Prix =

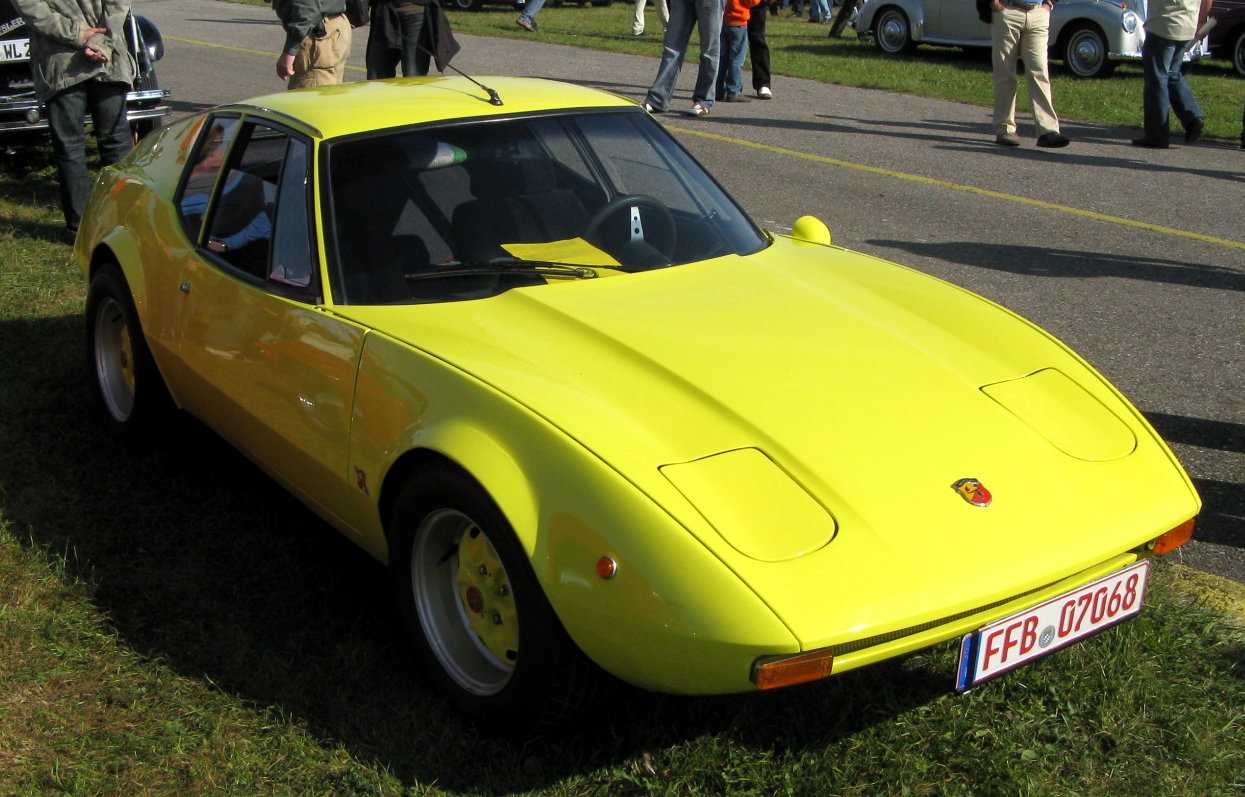

Overview
- Manufacturer: Carrozzeria Francis Lombardi
- Production: 1968–1972
- Assembly: Vercelli, Italy
- Designer: Giuseppe Rinaldi

Body and chassis
- Class: Sports car
- Body style: 2-door coupé; 2-door roadster
- Layout: Rear-engine, rear-wheel-drive layout

Powertrain
- Engine: 817 cc I4 (OTAS 820); 843 cc Fiat 100GB I4 (Lombardi); 982 cc I4 (Giannini); 994 cc Bialbero I4 (Giannini); 1280 cc Fiat 124 I4 (Scorpione)
- Transmission: 4-speed manual

Dimensions
- Wheelbase: 2,030 mm (79.9 in); 2,045 mm (80.5 in) (Scorpione)
- Length: 3,595 mm (141.5 in); 3,610 mm (142.1 in) (Scorpione)
- Width: 1,485 mm (58.5 in); 1,495 mm (58.9 in) (Scorpione)
- Height: 1,065 mm (41.9 in); 1,050 mm (41.3 in) (Scorpione)
- Curb weight: 630–750 kg (1,390–1,650 lb)

The Lombardi Grand Prix is a small, rear-engined sports car on the underpinnings of the Fiat 850 Special. It was developed by the Carrozzeria Francis Lombardi with an in-house design by Giuseppe Rinaldi. The car was built from 1968 until 1972 and was also marketed as the OTAS 820, as a Giannini, and as the Abarth Scorpione. It made its international debut in March 1968, at the Geneva Motor Show. The design had a Kammback rear and a very low nose with flip-up headlights, and a large single windshield wiper. The pop-up headlights were electrically powered. The bodywork was primarily steel, with the doors and rear panel made from GRP and the engine cover in aluminum to minimize weight. At Turin 1969 a targa version was also shown; called the "Monza", this open model had a rollover bar with a compartment immediately behind for storing the removable roof panels. The vertical rear window could be lowered by means of a winder located between the seat backs. Beyond a pair of show cars it is unknown whether any more were produced, but at least one has survived.

== Grand Prix ==
The original Lombardi Grand Prix as presented had the 843 cc engine from the Fiat 850 Special with 47 hp (35 kW) DIN at 6400 rpm, coupled to a four-speed gearbox. Low drag resistance and weight (630 kg or 1,390 lb) meant that this was supposedly enough for a top speed of 160 km/h (99 mph). In a period German test the maximum speed was measured as 153.8 km/h (95.6 mph). Luggage space is limited, with very little space next to the spare wheel up front and with a tiny area behind the seats. In case the electric wind-up mechanism for the headlights should fail, there is also a mechanical lever underneath the bonnet. The single round tail lights are Fiat 850 Coupé units. The front suspension consists of a transverse leaf spring on the bottom and A-arms on top, while the rear received coil sprung semi-trailing arms.

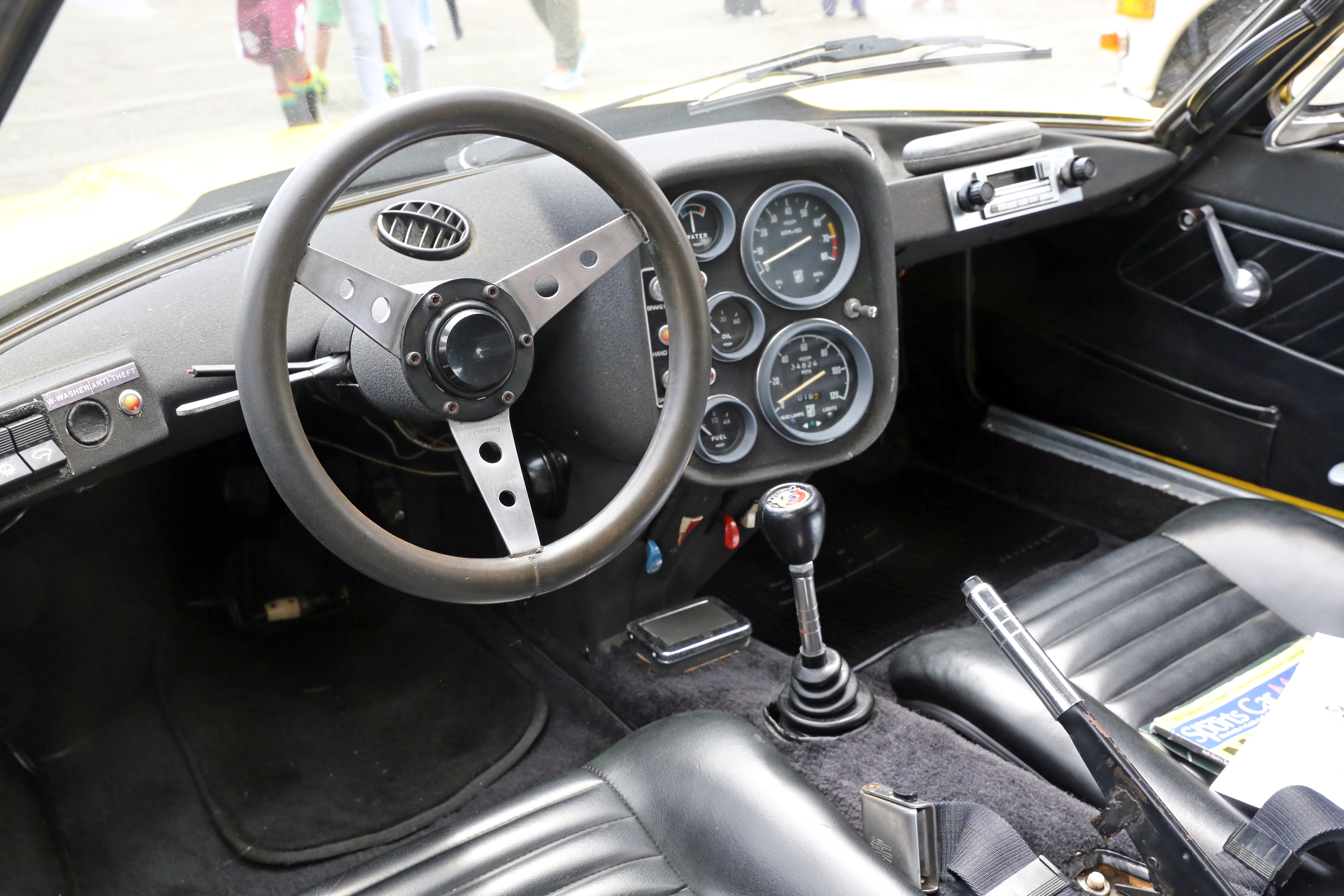
Interior of a 1971 OTAS 820, similar to that of other Lombardis

On early production models the standard GRP doors featured windows of a three-piece design (one on top, two lower pieces of which one could be slid open). This was soon changed for a more conventional layout with a vent window up front and a single fixed piece behind. Steel doors were available as an option, and on these the rear portion opened with a traditional winder (though it could only be rolled halfway down).

The Lombardi Grand Prix was built in two series. Changes for the Series II model, introduced in 1970, included: a louvered engine cover in black metal for improved cooling; front wings modified to accommodate new, wider wheels (5½ inch, versus 4½ inch on the Series I cars); and a bonnet with a raised central rib to make room for a larger spare wheel.

A Cypriot millionaire casino owner had also shown interest in the Lombardi Grand Prix around the time of its introduction. Frixos Demetriou intended to market the car in the United Kingdom and began planning for an order of 1000 cars. In an attempt to Anglicize the Grand Prix, Demetriou looked at replacing its Fiat 850 underpinnings with those of the British-made Hillman Imp Sport, which would have lowered its price in the UK by around 15 percent. Ultimately the venture was a failure, with only a handful of cars finding buyers; a few unsold units were re-exported to Cyprus in 1970 to avoid pending customs bills.

== OTAS and Giannini ==
Rome-based engine tuner Giannini Automobili was quick to offer higher performance versions of the Grand Prix. An example equipped with a Giannini engine was displayed on their stand at the Turin Racing Car Exhibition in March 1968, two weeks before the Grand Prix's official Geneva launch. Marketed as the Giannini 1000 Grand Prix, this model received a tuned version of the regular Fiat 850 motor, stroked to 982 cc (65 mm x 74 mm), for a claimed output of 84 hp SAE. At the 1968 Turin Auto Show a few months later, they introduced the even sportier 1000 Bialbero Grand Prix. This version featured a 994 cc (64.6 mm x 76 mm) twin overhead camshaft motor of Giannini's own design, which was claimed to make 104 hp SAE at 7500 rpm.

Following the death of Giannini Automobili's founder, Domenico Giannini, his son Franco left the company in 1969 to focus on his own business in Turin, OGT (Officina Giannini Torino, or "Giannini Turin workshop"). Seeing potential in the American market, OGT developed a version of the Grand Prix to meet US standards, which was displayed at the 1969 Turin Motor Show as the OGT 1000. Sporting the central bonnet rib and louvered engine cover of the upcoming Series II Grand Prix, it featured a new 903 cc engine (65 mm x 68 mm) fitted with a fuel-injection system that was Franco Giannini's own brainchild. This system replaced the carburetor's Venturi tube with a mechanical fuel metering device, and was reported to offer a significant improvement in power while still meeting the contemporary US emissions limits. Lombardi was also interested in exporting this model to Australia.

The car attracted the interest of an American importer, Siata International of Newark, New Jersey, who distributed the Siata Spring in the US, and they placed an order for three hundred units. However, Giannini Automobili in Rome objected to the name Officina Giannini Torino, so Franco Giannini set up a new company, OTAS (Officina Trasformazioni Automobili Sportive, or "Sports car conversion workshop") to fulfill the order. Siata International displayed the car, now rebranded as the OTAS Tigre, on their stand at the New York International Automobile Show in April 1970.

Shortly thereafter, the Italian manufacturer Siata declared bankruptcy, and in the ensuing fallout the American distributor abandoned its plans to import the Tigre. Having already completed the conversion of one hundred cars, OTAS urgently started looking for a new US distributor. Eventually a deal was struck with John Rich of Glendale, California, but by then emission regulations had grown stricter and the cars OTAS had already prepared could not be made to comply. Since engines under 50 cubic inches were exempt from regulation, OTAS decided to convert all one hundred cars again, this time reducing the engine capacity to 817 cc (49.9 cu in). The resulting cars (which retained Fiat 850 chassis numbers) were marketed in the US from 1971 as the OTAS 820. Sources differ as to how many were ultimately brought to North America; either sixty-five or as many as a hundred.

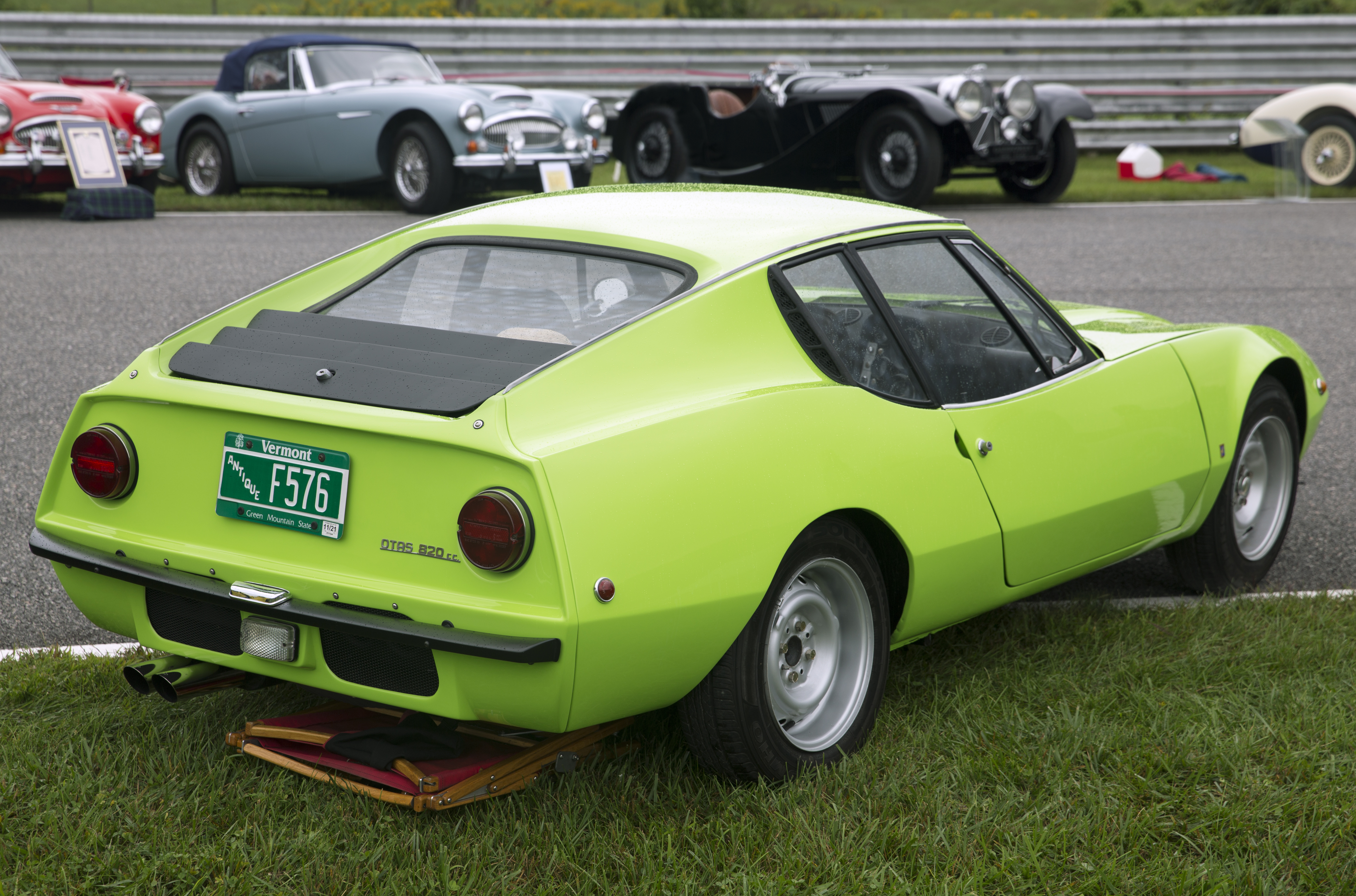
Rear view of 1971 OTAS 820 (US)

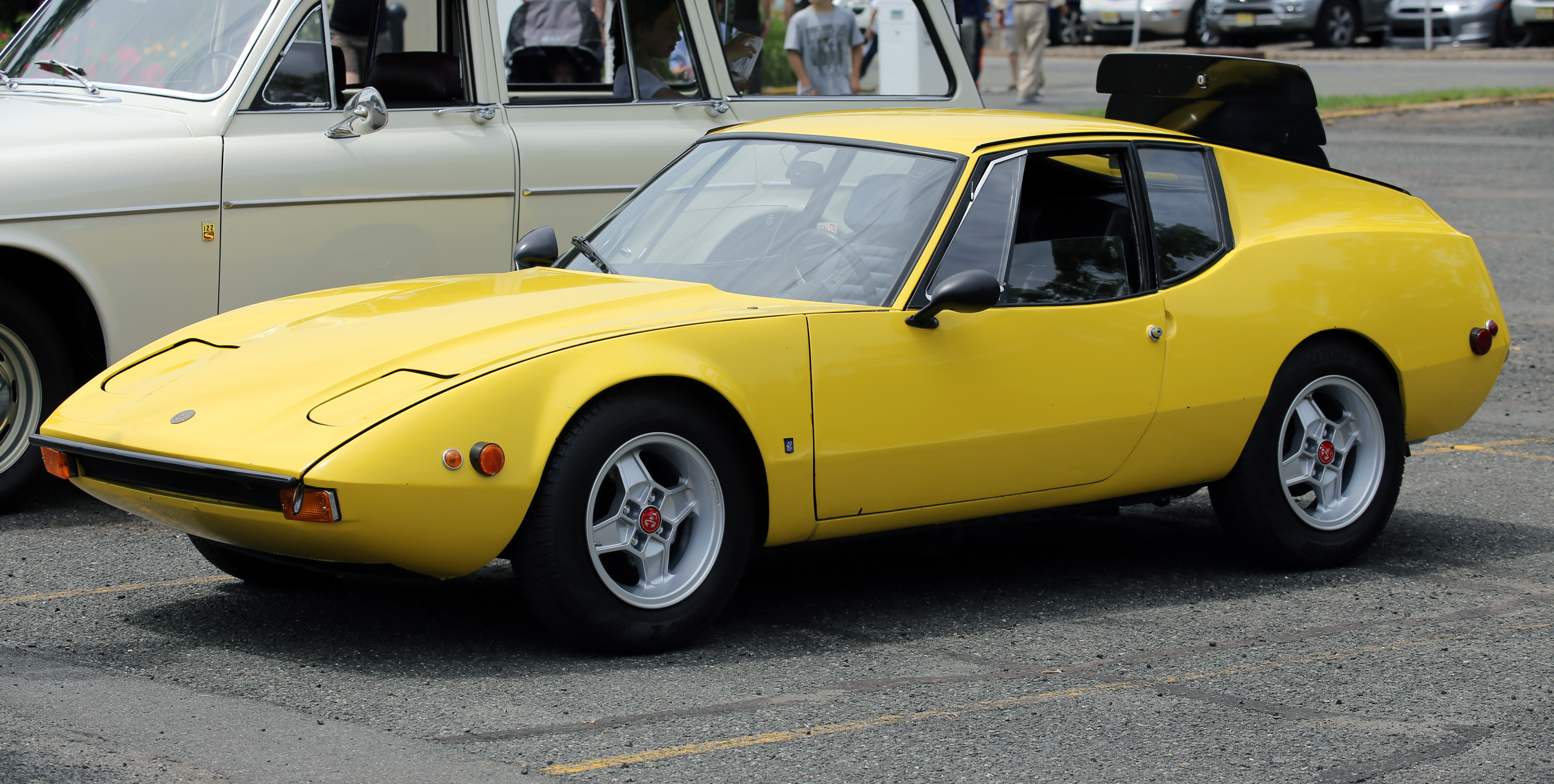
Front view of 1971 OTAS 820

== Abarth models ==
As with Giannini, Carlo Abarth was keen to work his magic on the Grand Prix. The result of his endeavors was the Abarth 1300 Scorpione, which made its debut at the Paris Motor Show in October 1968. It utilized the same modified 1280 cc (75.5 mm × 71.5 mm) version of the Fiat 124 engine that Abarth had developed for the 1966 Fiat-Abarth OT 1300 Coupe. A special Abarth-made bell housing allowed the 124 engine to be mated to the four-speed 850 gearbox. Two variants were offered: the basic model retained the suspension and brakes of the underlying Fiat 850, while the Scorpione S added a revised suspension of Abarth's own design and four-wheel disc brakes. Both versions featured a front-mounted radiator for improved engine cooling. The associated front air inlets, together with an external fuel filler, visually distinguished the Abarth from its Lombardi counterpart.

With a big jump in power to 75 hp (55 kW) DIN, and a weight increase of just 65 kg (143 lb), the Scorpione offered a significant improvement in performance over the standard Grand Prix. In a 1970 road test by Auto, Motor und Sport, the Scorpione reached a top speed of 175.6 km/h (109.1 mph), compared to 153.8 km/h (95.6 mph) for the Lombardi version. The 0 to 100 km/h (0 to 62 mph) time dropped from 16.7 s to 12.7 s. Although the heavier 124 engine exacerbated the car's rearward weight bias (39/61), this seems to have had only a modest effect on handling, limited to some front-end lift at higher speeds.

In 1969, Abarth introduced what would become the ultimate version of the Scorpione; the Scorpione SS featured the same suspension and brake upgrades as the previous S model, but added the option of twin 32 DCOF Weber carburetors, boosting power output to around 100 hp (74 kW). The SS ended up being the final iteration of Abarth's last independently developed car; Fiat took the company over in 1971, at which point the Scorpione was quickly cancelled.

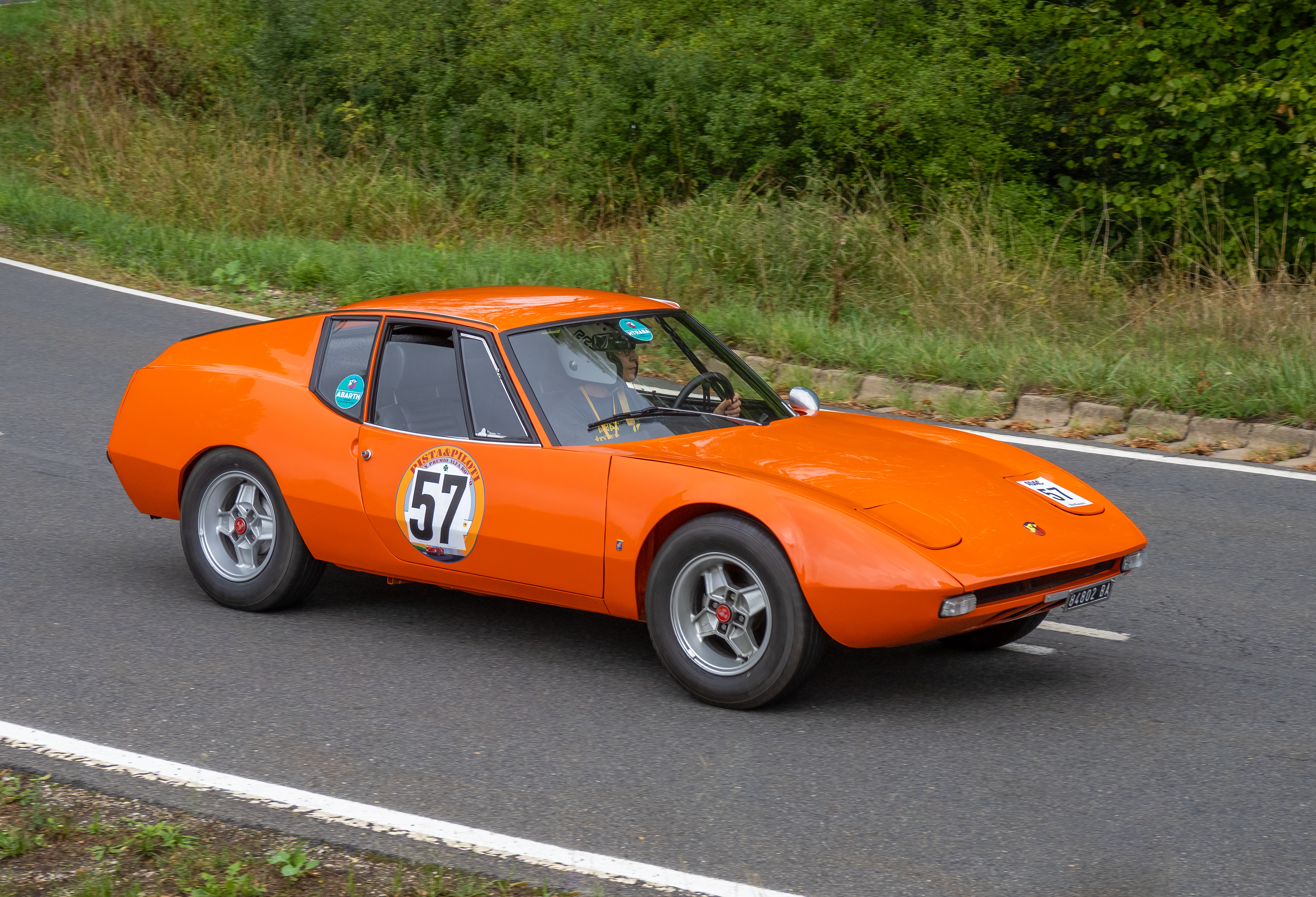
Abarth 1300 Scorpione

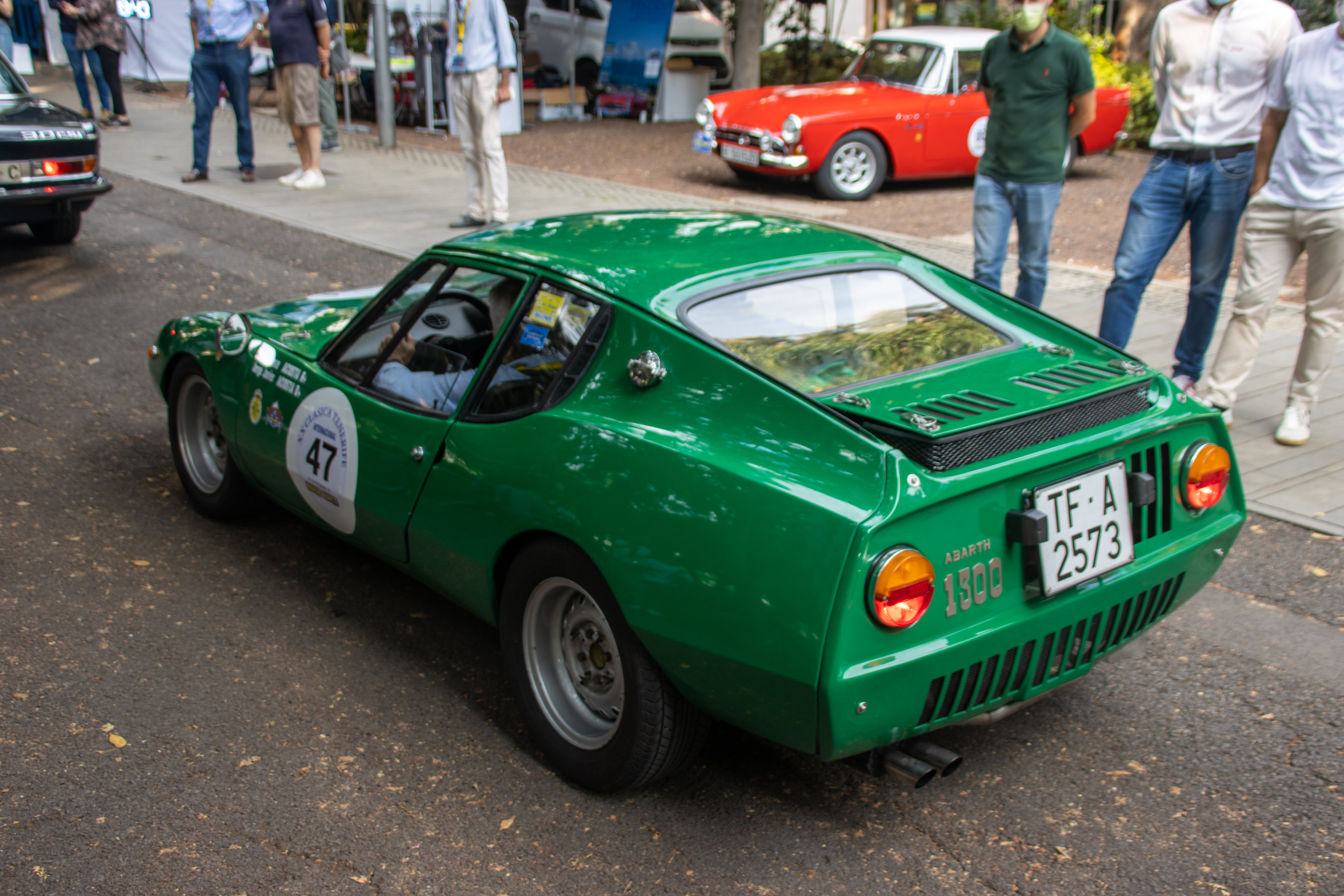
Rear view of Abarth 1300 Scorpione
