= Vashon Ranger R7 =

American light-sport aircraft

Ranger R7
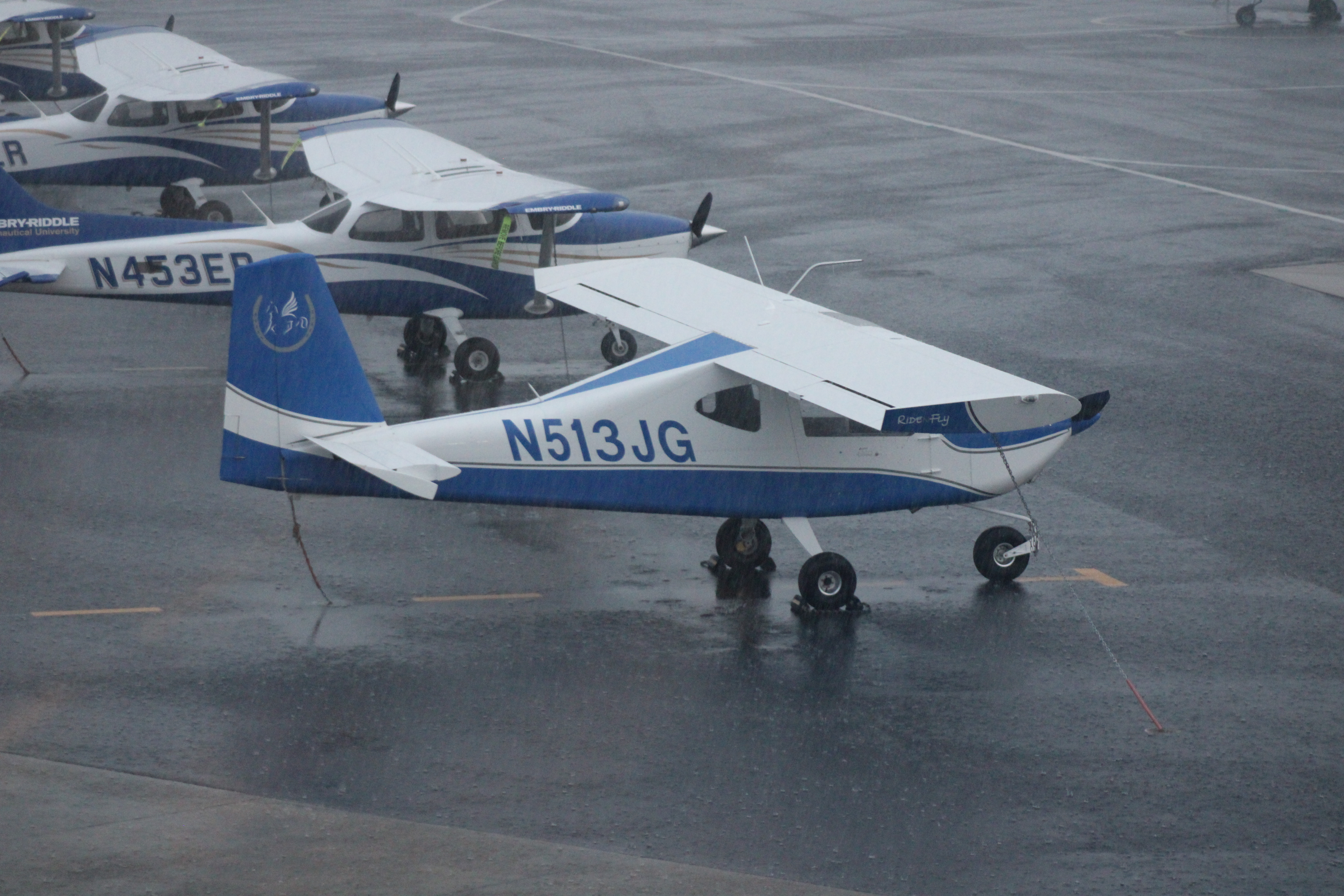
- Vashon Ranger R7 Redwood

General information
- Type: Light-sport aircraft
- National origin: United States
- Manufacturer: Vashon Aircraft
- Status: In production (2021)

History
- Manufactured: 2017-present
- First flight: March 31, 2015

The Vashon Ranger R7 is an American light-sport aircraft designed and produced by Vashon Aircraft of Woodinville, Washington. It was formally introduced at the AirVenture airshow in Oshkosh, Wisconsin in July 2018. The aircraft is supplied as a complete ready-to-fly-aircraft.

== Design and development ==
The development of the Ranger R7 started in about 2013. The first prototype was built by MM Aviation as the Patriot V-150. By February 2018, two prototypes were flying and four production aircraft were under construction for April 2018 delivery.

The aircraft is an all-metal monocoque design and features a cantilever high-wing, two-seats-in-side-by-side configuration enclosed cabin, fixed tricycle landing gear with a castering nosewheel, and a single engine in tractor configuration. The aircraft is made from pre-painted sheet 6061-T6 aluminum to save construction time. The seats fold flat to allow sleeping in the cabin when camping.

The company manufactures the majority of parts itself to reduce costs and shorten the supply chain.

By January 2018, the design had been accepted by the United States Federal Aviation Administration (FAA) as a light-sport aircraft.

== Operational history ==
The first Patriot V-150 prototype made its maiden flight on March 31, 2015. By May 2017, one example had been registered in the United States with the FAA.

In a review of the design on AVweb, writer Paul Bertorelli indicated that the aircraft suffers from a low useful load of 438 lb (199 kg) due to the choice of the old-technology Continental O-200D engine, which is at least 50 lb (23 kg) heavier than other newer engines.

By April 2019, 12 production aircraft had been delivered to customers, which included individuals and flight schools. By August 2021, 50 aircraft had been delivered; by November 2021, 66 had been delivered. As of November 2026, 144 aircraft are on the FAA registry.

== Variants ==
Patriot V-150
At least one prototype built by MM Aviation and first flown in March 2015. A second prototype had begun construction and was registered in May 2017, but its completion is unconfirmed.
Ranger R7 Yellowstone
Base model powered by a 100 hp (75 kW) Continental O-200-D four-stroke, air-cooled powerplant and fitted with a Dynon SkyView Touch glass cockpit avionics system. No longer in production.
Ranger R7 Glacier
Intermediate model powered by a 100 hp (75 kW) Continental O-200-D four-stroke, air-cooled powerplant and fitted with a 10" Dynon SkyView HDX glass cockpit avionics system, additional exterior options are also available. This variant is now the base model aircraft available.
Ranger R7 Redwood
Premium model powered by a 100 hp (75 kW) Continental O-200-D four-stroke, air-cooled powerplant and fitted with dual 10" Dynon SkyView HDX glass cockpit avionics system, additional exterior options are also available.
Ranger R7 Cascade
IFR Capable model powered by a 100 hp (75 kW) Continental O-200-D four-stroke, air-cooled powerplant and fitted with dual 10" Dynon SkyView HDX glass cockpit avionics system as well a Garmin GTN 650Xi (GPS/MFD/COM/NAV), additional exterior options are also available.

== Specifications (R7) ==
Data from Grady and manufacturer

General characteristics

- Crew: one
- Capacity: one passenger
- Empty weight: 875 lb (397 kg)
- Gross weight: 1,320 lb (599 kg)
- Fuel capacity: 28 U.S. gallons (110 L; 23 imp gal)
- Powerplant: 1 × Continental O-200-D four cylinder, air-cooled, four stroke aircraft engine, 100 hp (75 kW)
- Propellers: 2-bladed Catto 2B-70x48 fixed pitch, 5 ft 10 in (1.78 m) diameter

Performance

- Maximum speed: 117 kn (135 mph, 217 km/h)
- Cruise speed: 114 kn (131 mph, 211 km/h) at gross weight, 2700 RPM, 7500 ft density altitude
- Stall speed: 45 kn (52 mph, 83 km/h) in cruise configuration at gross weight
- Never exceed speed: 131 kn (151 mph, 243 km/h)
- Range: 501 nmi (577 mi, 928 km) at gross weight, 2700 RPM, 7500 ft density altitude, 30 minute reserve
- Service ceiling: 12,000 ft (3,700 m)
- g limits: +4.0/-2.0
- Rate of climb: 833 ft/min (4.23 m/s) at gross weight, VY 75 KIAS, sea level

Avionics

- Dynon SkyView HDX 10" touch screen glass panel avionics system with Wi-Fi (Dual in Redwood & Cascade Variants)
- Dynon SkyView Two-Axis Autopilot with Level Button
- Dynon SkyView Mode S Transponder with 2020-Compliant ADS-B Out
- Dynon SkyView COM Radio with Two-Place Intercom
- Garmin GTN 650Xi (Cascade Variant Only)
