= R7 Quad =

The R7 Quad is a line of golf clubs manufactured by TaylorMade. Since its introduction in 2004, it has been the most-used driver on the PGA Tour and the best-selling driver in the amateur market.

The R7 Quad was one of the first drivers to feature Movable Weight Technology, which enabled the golfer to rearrange four differently weighted screws in the driver's head in order to alter the flight of the ball according to a player's personal preferences. For the average golfer, this meant being able to use the clubs different weight settings in order to correct a hook or a slice. Under the rules of golf, this type of equipment adjustability is legal, provided that no changes are made during play.

The R7 driver has been one of the most popular drivers in golf because of its ability to reduce the effects of faults. With the success of the R7 Quad, some other companies have sought to bring customizable products to the market, while others have produced clubs that are pre-weighted for the same corrective ball-flight.

The 2009 season saw the introduction of the new R9 series. The R9 is built on the R7 movable weight technology by adding Flight Control Technology (FCT) which allows the player to adjust the face angle and loft/lie of the driver to correct the shot shape. Combined with the MWT, the flight control allows (in theory) for 75 yards of lateral shot adjustment (plus additional shot height adjustment due to the changing of the face angle), compared to the latest R7 series driver the R7 Limited which had only a 40 yards of lateral shot adjustment.

== Models ==
- R7 Quad (Original design with 4 Movable weights)
- R7 425 (Larger 425cc head with 4 Movable weights)
- R7 460 (Largest legal head by rules of golf, 460cc with 2 movable weights)
- R7 Superquad (4 movable weights in a 460cc head)
- R7 Draw (Preset draw bias to correct slice: Only club in the R7 line not to have Movable Weights)
- R7 CGB Max (Triangular shaped 460cc head to increase forgiveness with only 3 Movable Weights)
- R7 CGB Max Limited (Same design as the R7 CGB Max, but with a smaller 415cc head and 3 interchangeable shafts)
- R7 Limited (Triangular shaped 440cc head for a lower center of gravity (CG) with 3 Movable Weights)

A Tour Preferred version of the R7 Quad, 425, 460, and Superquad, supplied with a number of additional differently weighted cartridges for even more placement variations, non OEM shafts using models directly from the top shaft manufacturers such as Matrix, Fujikura, and Mitsubishi Rayon, instead of the 'co-engineered' models, and 1-degree open face, is (or was) also available. In addition, there are some official models that have been released only in Asia.

== See also ==
- TaylorMade-adidas
