= Carrozzeria Francis Lombardi =

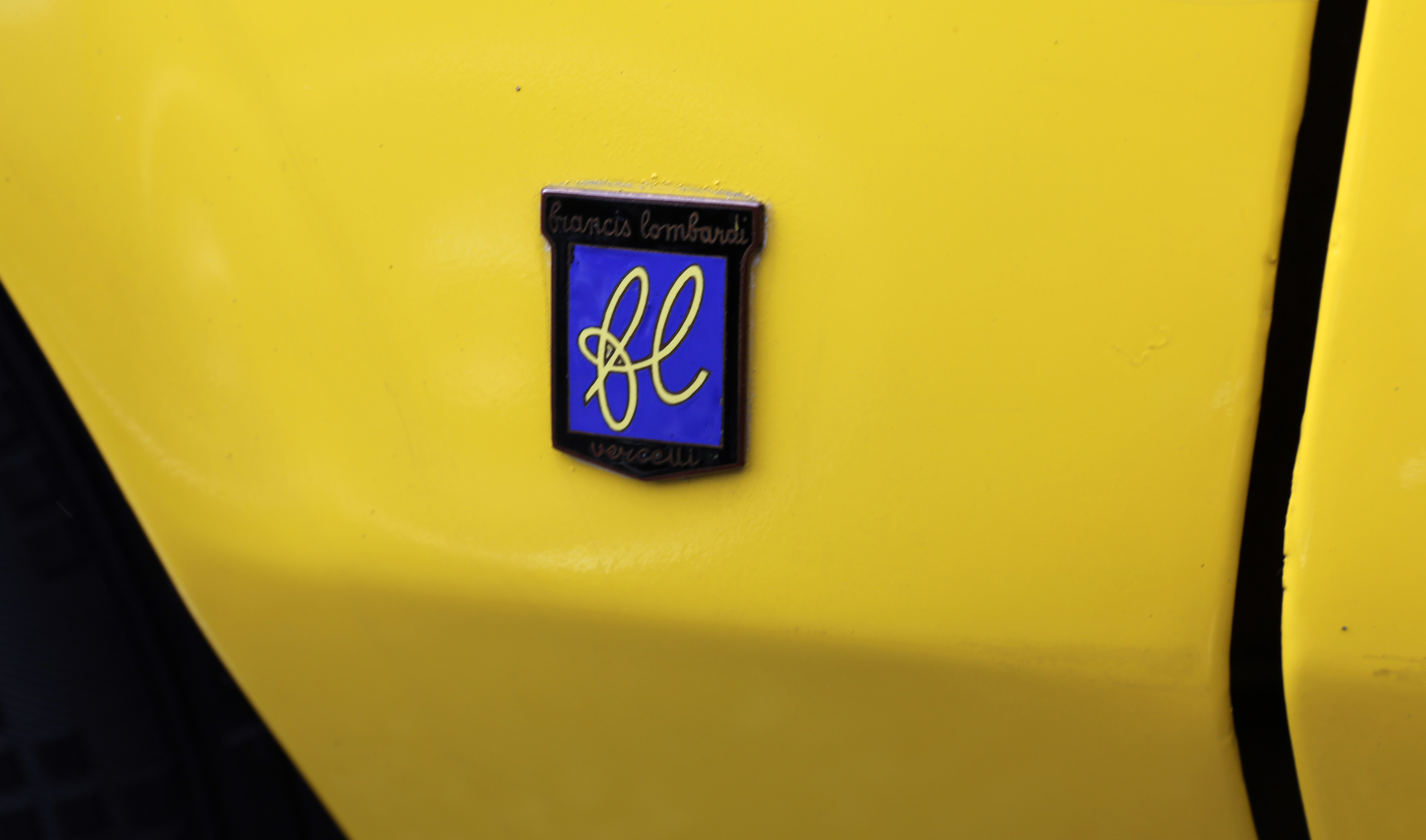
- Founded: 1947
- Founder: Carlo "Francis" Lombardi
- Defunct: 1973
- Headquarters: Vercelli, Italy
- Products: Automotive

The Carrozzeria Francis Lombardi was founded in 1947 in Vercelli, Italy, by noted pilot Carlo "Francis" Lombardi. They originally engaged in some aeronautical design, but this soon ended. Their most famous car was the Lombardi Grand Prix, which was also marketed under a variety of other names such as O.T.A.S. and Abarth. The company was closed in 1973.

== History ==
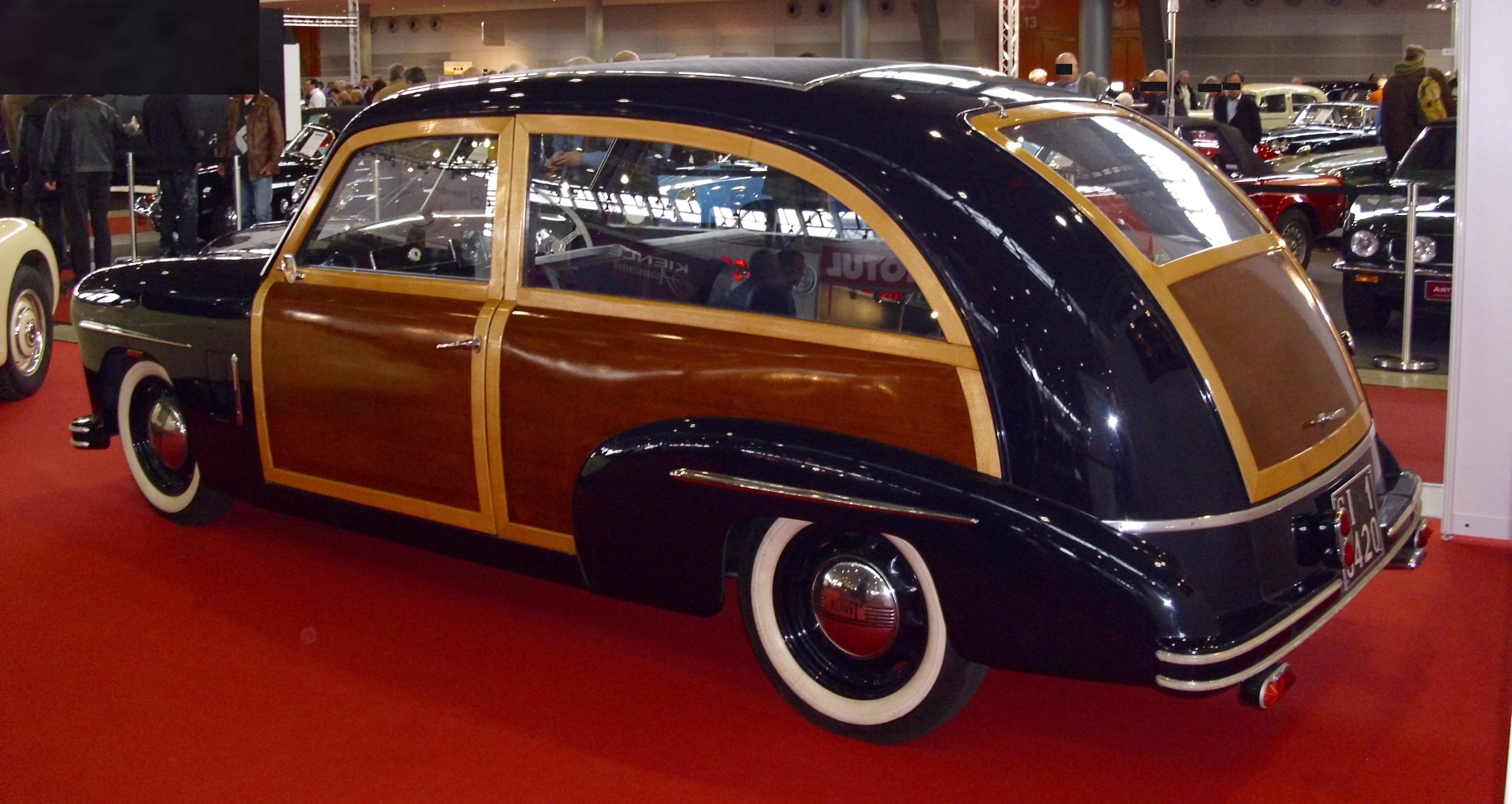
1948 Lancia Aprilia-based "Giardiniera"

Founded in 1947, they focussed exclusively on automobiles after 1950. Their first efforts were coupés on Fiat 1100 and 1400 basis; these were soon followed by station wagons with wood-panelled bodywork on 1100-basis. Francis Lombardi also made six-seater limousines from Fiat sedans of the period such as the 1400 and 1800. Intended for ministerial or representational use, they had stretched wheelbases and luxuriously fitted interiors. Famously, they built a Vatican-commissioned Fiat 2300-based limousine with a glass roof for Pope Paul VI in 1963 - this was the first "true" Popemobile.

=== 1960s ===
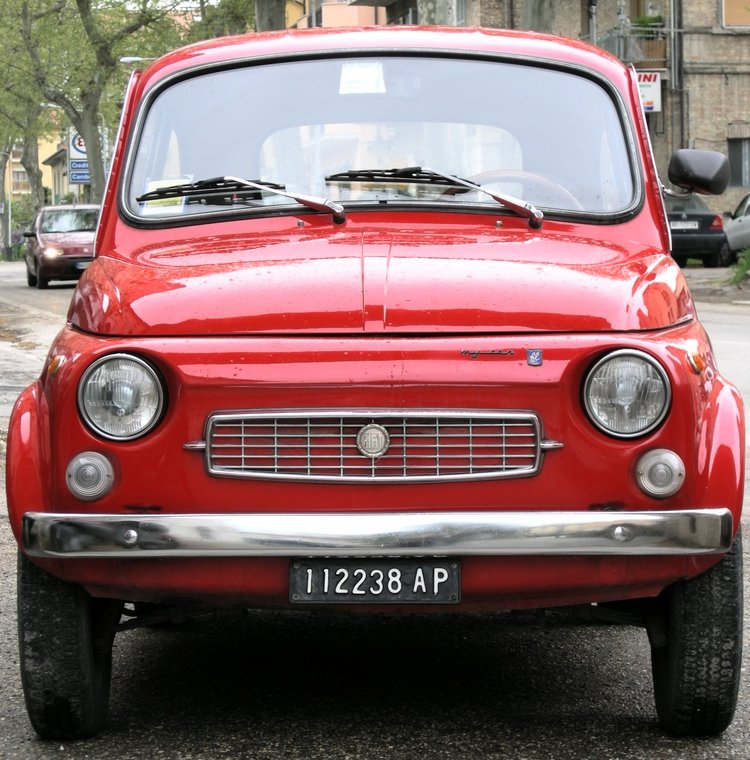
Francis Lombardi Fiat 500 My Car

Francis Lombardi also developed four-door versions of the Fiat 600, 850, and 127. This series of small four-door saloons was called Lucciola ("Firefly" in Italian) by Lombardi. The first one was the 600 Lucciola which appeared in early 1957; in addition to four doors without a B-pillar (the rear door opening backwards) it also had a floor mounted shifter unlike the regular 600. Francis Lombardi's greatest commercial success was with the luxuriously appointed Fiat 500 called "My Car"; which supported an annual production of about 6,000 cars in the sixties, up from about 1,500 towards the late fifties. The Fiat 850 Lucciola was also used by Spain's SEAT for their 850 four-door sedan, although eventually they developed their own, longer version.

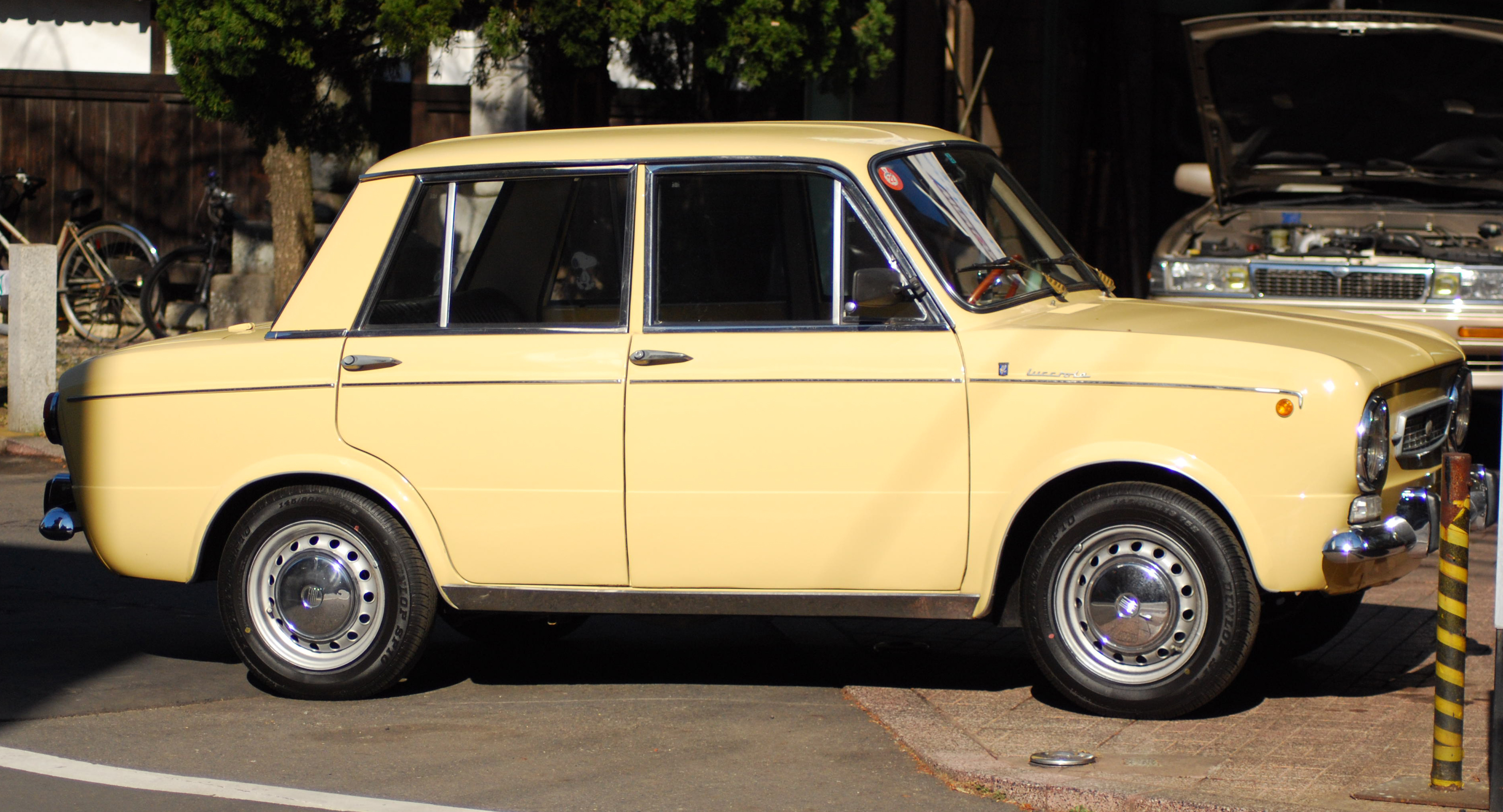
Francis Lombardi Fiat 850 Lucciola

At the end of the sixties, the Lombardi Grand Prix appeared, the closest thing to an independent design from the firm. This model had a convoluted history and was sold in small numbers under a variety of names until 1972, fitted with Fiat engines in various states of tune. Francis Lombardi continued to focus on modifying cars as well, building coupés on Fiat as well as on NSU basis (1000 TTS). In the 1970s, they made special versions of the Fiat 128 and Lancia 2000. In 1972, Lombardi introduced the FL1 at the Turin Auto Show, a mid-engined car designed to be powered by either a Lancia 2000 IE or a Ford 3.0 L V6 engine, with a weight of 800 kg (1,764 lb) and a planned production volume of 150 to 200 cars per year. This prototype never reached production, and was later sold to Covini Engineering. In 1973, their doors were closed for good. Ten years later, Carlo Lombardi died.
