= Continental O-200 =

Family of aircraft engines

C90/O-200
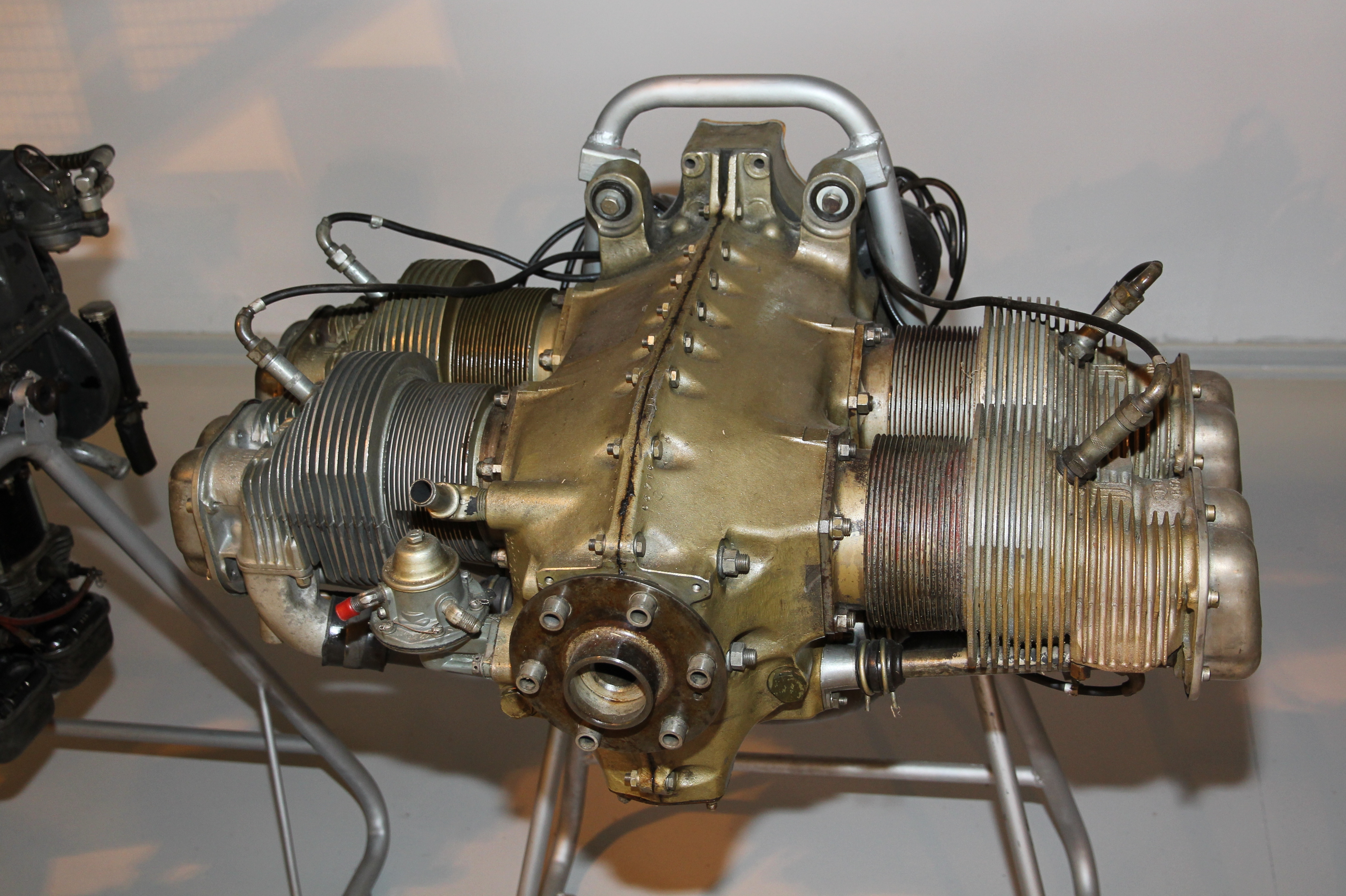
- O-200 on display at the Finnish Air Force Museum
- Type: Piston aircraft engine
- National origin: United States
- Manufacturer: Teledyne Continental Motors
- First run: 1947
- Major applications: Cessna 140; Cessna 150; Cessna 162 Skycatcher; ERCO Ercoupe; RLU-1 Breezy
- Manufactured: 1947-1980s (for GA); 2004-present (for LSA sector)
- Developed from: Continental O-190

The Continental C90 and O-200 are a family of air-cooled, horizontally opposed, four-cylinder, direct-drive aircraft engines of 201 in^{3} (3.29 L) displacement, producing between 90 and 100 horsepower (67 and 75 kW).

Built by Continental Motors these engines are used in many light aircraft designs of the United States, including the early Piper PA-18 Super Cub, the Champion 7EC, the Alon Aircoupe, and the Cessna 150.

Though the C90 was superseded by the O-200, and many of the designs utilizing the O-200 had gone out of production by 1980, with the 2004 publication of the United States Federal Aviation Administration light-sport aircraft regulations came a resurgence in demand for the O-200.

== Design and development ==
The C90 was introduced in 1947 as a development from the earlier O-190 series (C75/C85) by increasing the stroke 1/4 inch, which in turn is an enlarged bore upgrade of the O-170 series (A50/A65/A75/A80) which had been in production since 1939. Many of the designs powered by the C90 are upgraded variants of earlier A65 powered designs, such as the Piper J-3 Cub and PA-11 Cub Special, Aeronca 7AC, and Luscombe 8A.

This engine family is considered to be dependable, according to both industry publications and the FAA.

In a cooperative venture, Rolls-Royce produced these same designs in England, under separate certification, with model designations beginning RR, e.g. the Rolls-Royce RR C90-12FH is the equivalent of the Continental C90-12FH; the Rolls-Royce versions are "directly interchangeable with the equivalent models manufactured by Continental." The Rolls-Royce O-200-A powers the Beagle Pup Series 1, the Rollason Condor, the Bölkow Bo 208 C Junior, the Avions Robin DR 220, the Morane-Saulnier MS-880, plus the Victa Airtourer 100 and the Reims F150 (a version of the Cessna 150 license-built in France by Reims Aviation).

All versions of the C90 and O-200 are four-stroke reciprocating engines and are all similar in size, displacement and weight. The crankcase is split in two light alloy halves while the cylinders have steel barrels with aluminium heads threaded onto them and are flanged to the crankcase. These engines are typically fitted with an updraft carburetor, though the C90-8FJ, -12FJ, and -14FJ are equipped with fuel injection systems. They utilize a redundant ignition system requiring no external power, driving two magnetos, each of which fires one spark plug per cylinder, resulting in a twin-spark design. The advance is fixed at 28° BTDC but the magnetos are equipped with pulse coupling for easier startups. Each cylinder has one intake valve and one exhaust valve, pushrod-activated with hydraulic tappets. The crankshaft is supported by three main bearings. All cylinders are identical for both the left and right bank, as a result, due to the offset of the crank throws between opposing cylinder, the exhaust valve pushrods of opposing pairs of cylinders are aligned on each other. This allows them to share a single cam for both cylinders, and so the camshaft itself only has six cams instead of eight, resulting shorter and lighter. Lubrication is wet sump but with the oil pan almost completely separated from the crankcase, being a sort of tank connected to it via a collar, inside which runs the pick-up tube feeding a gear pump, the driving impeller being directly connected to the camshaft, while the driven impeller incorporates the output for the tachometer cable. Normal operating oil pressure is between 30 and 60 PSI (2,1 to 4,2 bar).

All engine accessories (magnetos, dynamo / alternator, starter) are gear-driven through a gearbox integrated in the back of the engine. On the front side, the engine has provision for the gyroscopic instruments vacuum pump and for a mechanical AC fuel pump. Both are driven via the camshaft, through a conical gear and an eccentric, respectively.

Continental's recommended time between overhaul (TBO) for these engines is 1,800 hours of operation or 12 years in service, whichever is reached first. The standard certification for the C90 and O-200 specifies Avgas 80/87 as the minimum fuel grade. Both are eligible for operation on automobile gasoline on the basis of Supplemental Type Certificates.

While the C90 is approved for takeoff power of 95 horsepower (71 kW) at 2,625 rpm for five minutes, the designation is derived from its continuous power rating of 90 hp (67 kW) at 2,475 rpm. As noted above, certain models of the C90 replace the usual carburetor with a fuel injection system. In addition, there are models which provide for the installation of a controllable-pitch propeller and one, the C90-12FP, designed for a pusher configuration installation. While having slightly less horsepower than the O-200, many floatplane operators prefer the performance of the C90 over the O-200, due to its higher torque at lower rpm. This is primarily due to the C90's camshaft design: according to the manufacturer manual, while the valve lift is the same, the O-200 has greater scavenge angle (both valves open) by earlier opening of the intake valve BTDC and also an earlier opening of the exhaust valve BBDC on the expansion stroke, pushing the torque higher. The C90 is also known by its military designation of O-205.

The O-200 is an updated and upgraded version of the engine, achieving increased power of 100 hp (75 kW) at 2,750 rpm as a result of higher maximum rpm. The standard and most common model of the engine is the O-200-A; the -B model is designed for a pusher installation, the -C model provides for the installation of a controllable-pitch propeller, and the -D model is a lower-weight version designed for light-sport aircraft.

== Operational history ==
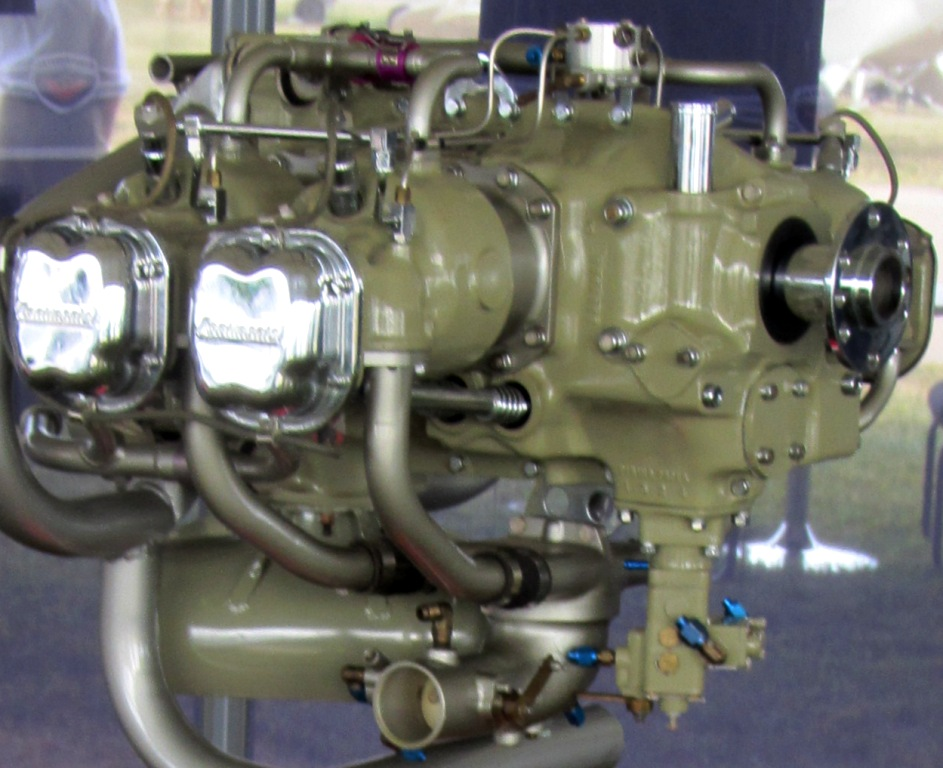
Continental IOL-200

An engine designated the IOL-200, an O-200 variant modified with fuel injection and liquid cooling, powered the 1986 nonstop, non-refueled global circumnavigation flight of the Rutan Voyager. The 110-horsepower (82 kW) IOL-200, also referred to as the Voyager 200, was the rear engine and—unlike the forward engine, another modified engine, a Continental O-240 —ran throughout the entire nine-day flight save for a four-minute shutdown due to a fuel problem.

Formula One racer Sharp Nemesis, designed and flown by Jon Sharp, was powered by a 'stock' O-200. Between 1991 and 1999, the aircraft won 45 of the 48 events in which it was entered, as well as winning three Louis Blériot medals, four Pulitzer Trophies, and setting 16 speed records in its class. In one of those records, Nemesis was clocked at more than 290 mph (467 km/h). By contrast, the O-200 powered Legend Cub cruises at 95 mph (152.9 km/h).

== Variants ==
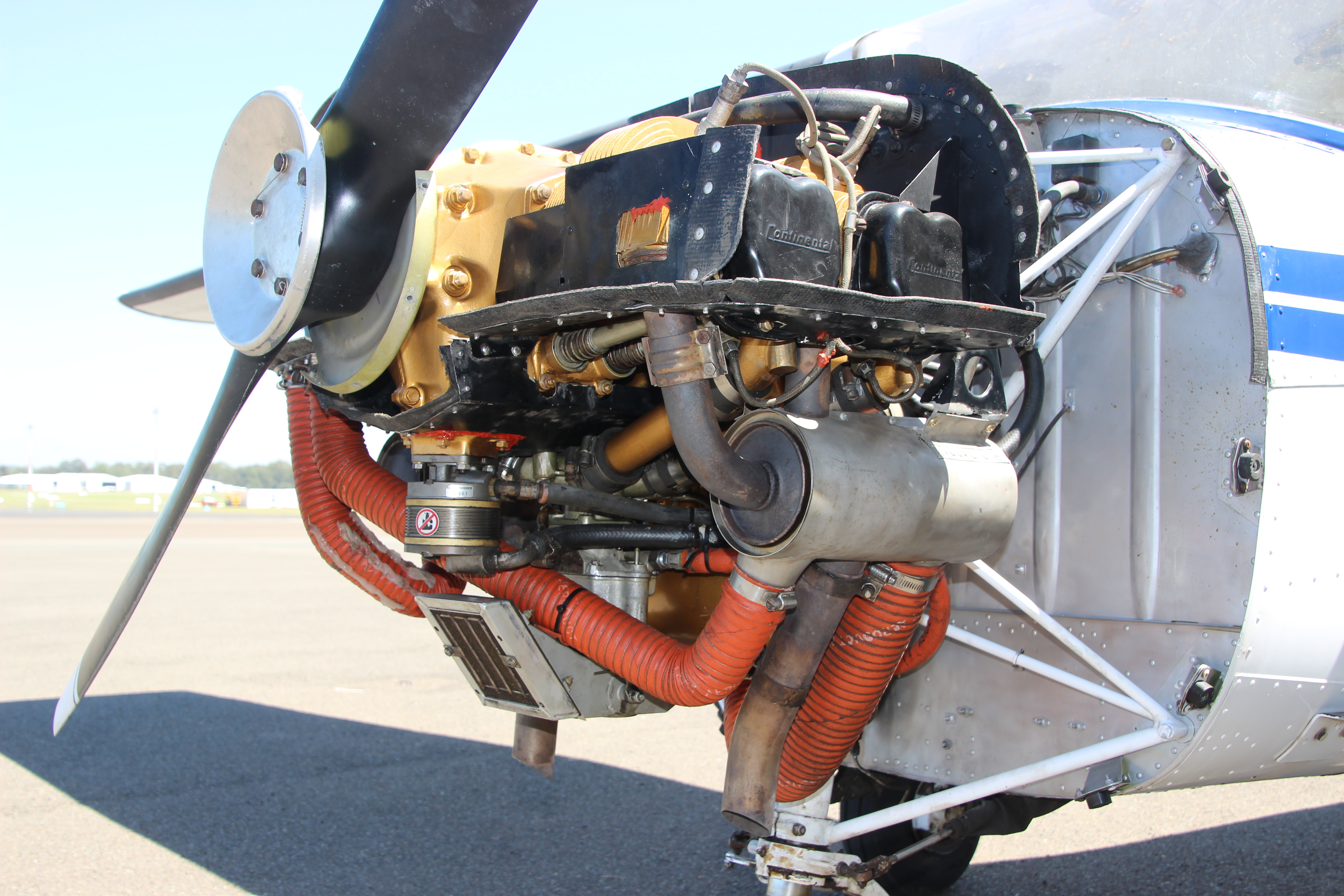

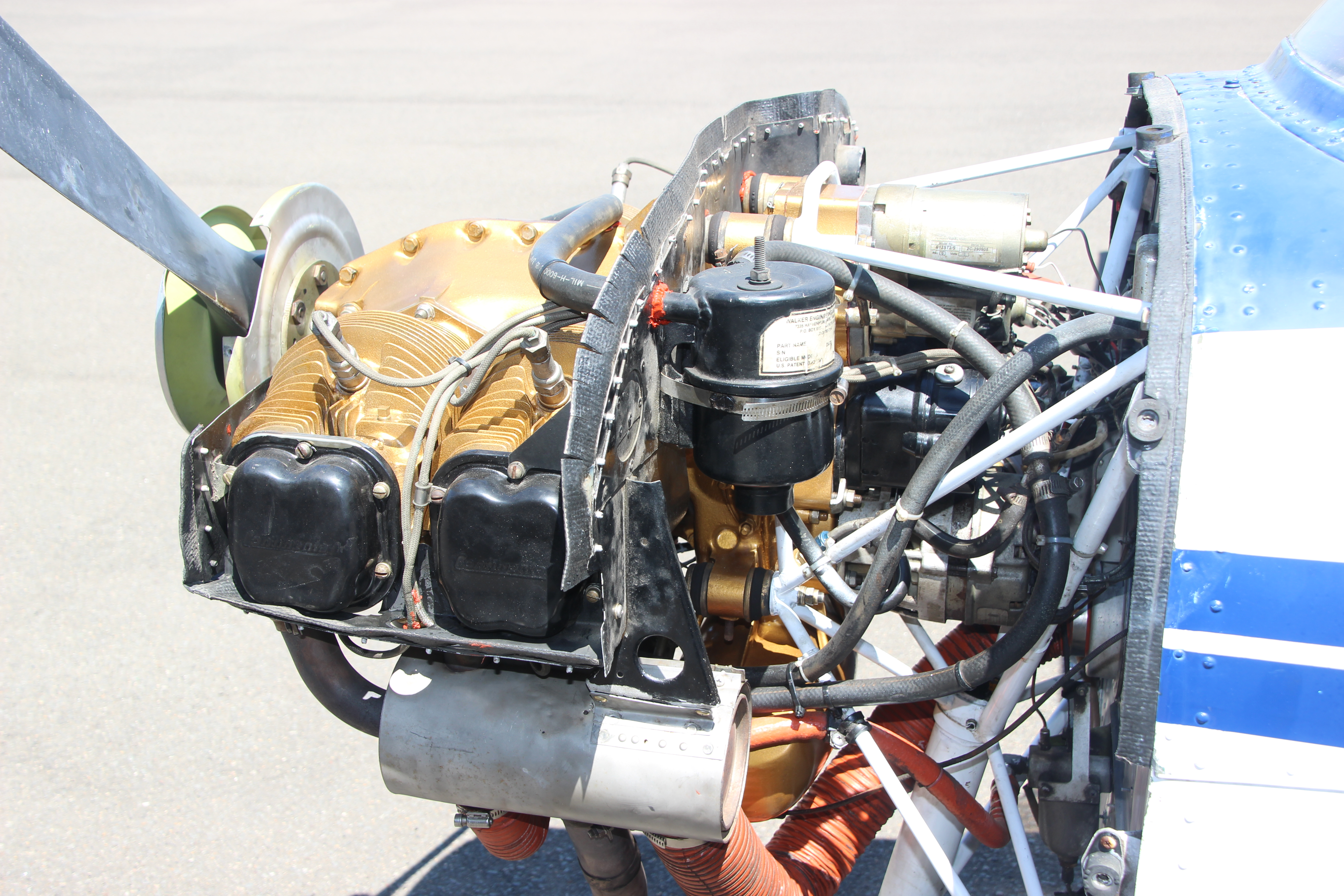
Two views of an O-200-A in a Cessna 150H

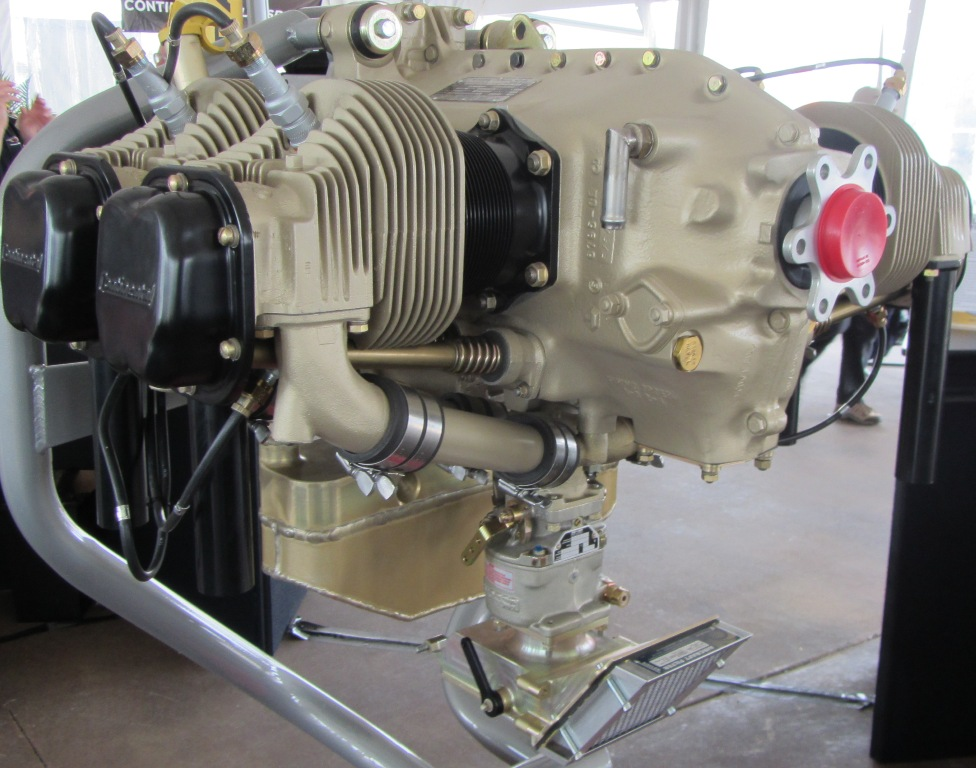
Continental O-200D

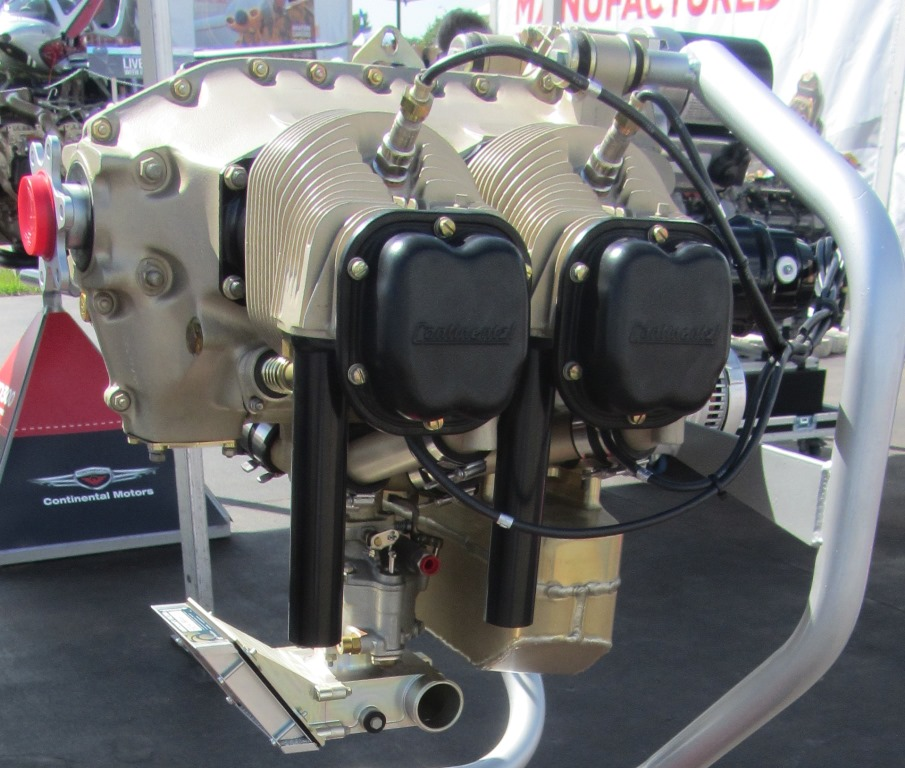
O-200AF

=== Certified versions ===
==== C90 ====
C90-8F
Lacks provisions for generator and starter drives, 90 hp (67 kW) continuous, 95 hp (71 kW) for take-off.
C90-8FJ
90 hp (67 kW) continuous, 95 hp (71 kW) for take-off.
C90-12F
Has provisions for generator and starter drives, 90 hp (67 kW) continuous, 95 hp (71 kW) for take-off.
C90-12FH
Has provisions for generator and starter drives, 90 hp (67 kW) continuous, 95 hp (71 kW) for take-off.
C90-12FJ
Has provisions for generator and starter drives, 90 hp (67 kW) continuous, 95 hp (71 kW) for take-off.
C90-12FP
Has provisions for generator and starter drives, 90 hp (67 kW) continuous, 95 hp (71 kW) for take-off.
C90-14F
90 hp (67 kW) continuous, 95 hp (71 kW) for take-off.
C90-14FH
90 hp (67 kW) continuous, 95 hp (71 kW) for take-off.
C90-14FJ
90 hp (67 kW) continuous, 95 hp (71 kW) for take-off.
C90-16F
Has vacuum pump drive provisions, 90 hp (67 kW) continuous, 95 hp (71 kW) for take-off.

==== O-200 ====
O-200-A
Model for tractor configuration, 100 hp (75 kW) continuous
O-200-B
Model with special crankshaft and crankcase for pusher configuration, 100 hp (75 kW) continuous
O-200-C
Model with provisions for a controllable pitch propeller, 100 hp (75 kW) continuous
O-200-D
Similar to the "A" model, but with weight reductions, 100 hp (75 kW) continuous
O-200-X
Similar to the "D" model except for engine dataplate identification, 100 hp (75 kW) continuous

=== Non-certified versions ===
O-200-AF
UL91 and UL94 95 hp alternate fuel engine.
IOL-200/Voyager 200
The aft engine of the round the world flight Rutan Voyager

== Applications ==
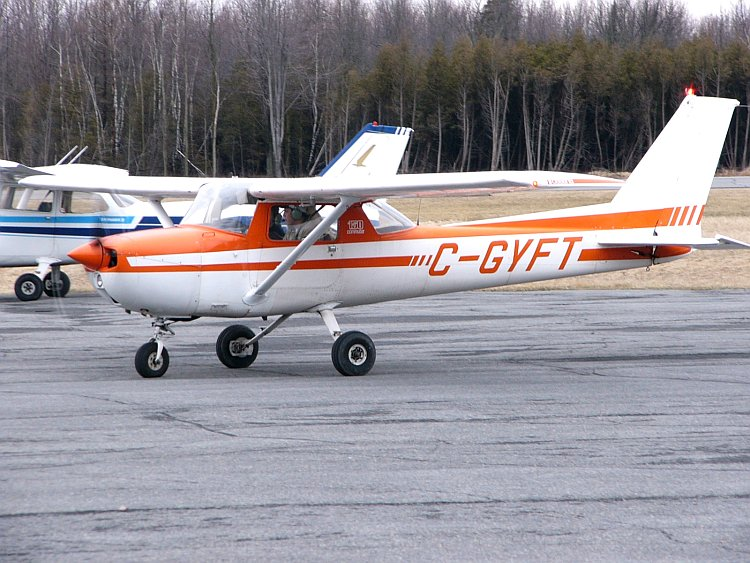
With 23,949 Cessna 150s built, this type is the most common application for the O-200.

- Aeronca Champion 7EC, 7FC
- Aeronca L-16B (Champion 7CCM)
- AMD Zodiac
- American Homebuilts John Doe
- Anglin J6 Karatoo
- ARV Griffin
- Barbaro RB-50
- Bearhawk LSA
- Bede BD-12
- Bölkow Bo 208
- Bushcaddy R-120
- Cassutt Special
- Cessna 140
- Cessna 150
- Cessna 162 Skycatcher
- Civil Aviation Department MG-1
- Coupé-Aviation JC-200
- CubCrafters Carbon Cub EX
- CubCrafters CC11-100 Sport Cub S2
- ERCO Ercoupe
- Falconar F11 Sporty
- Falconar Minihawk
- Fisher Celebrity
- Fisher Dakota Hawk
- Flaeming Air FA 04 Peregrine
- Fleet Model 80 Canuck
- Interstate Cadet
- IndUS Aviation Sport E
- Jodel D113-D11
- Jodel DR1050 Excellence
- Luscombe 8F, LSA-8
- Mace-Trefethen Seamaster
- Malmö MFI-9
- Mignet Pou-du-Ciel
- Miller-Bohannon JM-2 Pushy Galore
- Miller JM-2
- Nexaer LS1
- Piper PA-11 Cub Special, L-18B
- Piper PA-18-95 Super Cub, L-18C
- Pottier P.60 Minacro
- RLU-1 Breezy
- Rokospol Via
- Rutan Q200
- Rutan Voyager
- Rutan VariEze
- Ryson ST-100 Cloudster
- Socata Rallye
- Taylorcraft F-19 Sportsman
- Vashon Ranger R7
- Victa Airtourer 100
- VSR SR-1 Snoshoo
- VTOL Aircraft Phillicopter
- Warner Sportster
- Williams W-17 Stinger
- World Aircraft Spirit
- Zodiac 601 HD
- Zenith STOL CH 750

== Specifications (O-200-A) ==
Data from Engine specifications: O-200-A & B.

=== General characteristics ===
- Type: Four-cylinder air-cooled horizontally opposed piston engine
- Bore: 4.06 in (103.1 mm)
- Stroke: 3.88 in (98.6 mm)
- Displacement: 201 in^{3} (3.29 L)
- Length: 28.53 in (724.7 mm)
- Width: 31.56 in (801.6 mm)
- Height: 23.18 in (588.8 mm)
- Dry weight: 170.18 lb (77.19 kg) dry, without accessories

=== Components ===
- Valvetrain: Hydraulic lifters, two pushrod-actuated valves—one intake, one exhaust—per cylinder
- Fuel system: Updraft carburetor with manual mixture control
- Fuel type: 80/87 avgas minimum
- Oil system: 6 US quart (5.7 L), wet sump
- Cooling system: Air-cooled

=== Performance ===
- Power output: 100 hp (75 kW)
- Specific power: 0.5 hp/in^{3} (23 kW/L)
- Compression ratio: 7.0:1
- Power-to-weight ratio: 0.56 hp/lb (0.92 kW/kg)

== See also ==
Related development

- Continental A-65
- Continental O-300

Comparable engines

- Franklin O-200
- Lycoming O-235
- Rotax 912

Related lists

- List of aircraft engines
