= Jodel DR1050 Excellence =

French homebuilt aircraft

DR1050 Excellence
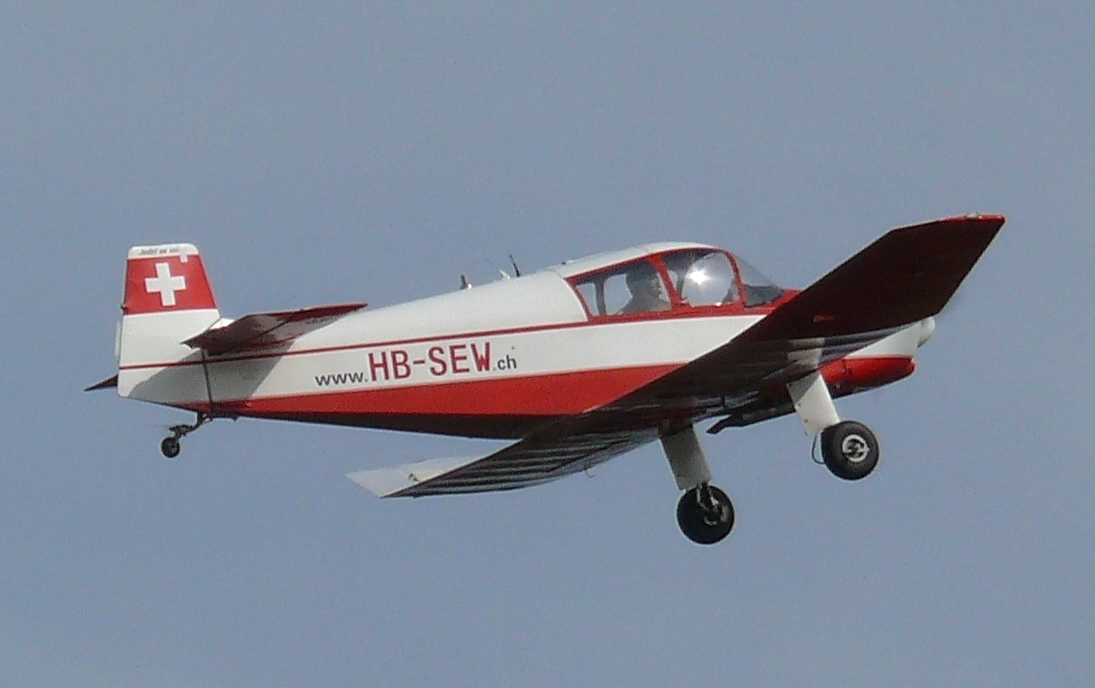
- Jodel DR1050

General information
- Type: Amateur-built aircraft
- National origin: France
- Manufacturer: Jodel
- Designer: Jodel and Pierre Robin
- Status: Plans available (2012)
- Number built: 618 factory built

History
- Developed from: Robin DR100
- Variant: Robin DR.200

The Jodel DR1050 Excellence and Ambassadeur are part of a family of French built aircraft, designed by Jean Délémontez (the principal designer of Jodel aircraft) in collaboration with Pierre Robin, as a development of the Jodel D.10 project. The aircraft was built from 1958 to 1967 both by Centre-Est Aeronautique (CEA) (see Robin Aircraft) and by Société Aéronautique Normande (SAN) but since the demise of the latter in 1968 has only been supplied as plans.

== Design and development ==
The original aircraft was designated the DR.100 and features a cantilever low-wing, a three-seat enclosed cockpit, fixed, tailwheel conventional landing gear with a single engine in tractor configuration. This was developed ultimately to the DR1050M1 Sicile Record with swept fin and many other refinements such as wheel pants and improved canopy. Versions were manufactured by both SAN and CEA and variously named Ambassadeur, Excellence, Sicile, and Sicile Record. At least 618 of the family were constructed, 286 by SAN and 332 by CEA, between 1958 and 1965. Tricycle landing gear is optional on home-built aircraft.

This design was further developed by CEA as the DR200/220/250 series and subsequently as the Robin DR400 series.

The aircraft is made from wood, with its flying surfaces covered in doped aircraft fabric. Its 8.72 m (28.6 ft) span wing employs a NACA 23012 airfoil and has an area of 13.60 m^{2} (146.4 sq ft). The standard engine used is the 100 hp (75 kW) Continental O-200 four-stroke powerplant.

== Variants ==
DR.100
Original version with 90 hp (67 kW) Continental C90 engine.
DR.105
First production version with 100 hp (75 kW) Continental O-200-A engine.
DR.1050
Improved version with Continental O-200-A engine or with 105 hp (78 kW) Potez 4E engine (as DR.1051).
DR.1050M
Modified version of DR.1050, with swept fin, one piece all-moving tailplane and available with Continental O-200-A or Potez 4E engines (as DR.1051M).
DR.1050M1
Final version of DR.1050, with one piece all-moving tailplane and available with Continental O-200-A or Potez 4E engines (as DR.1051M1).

== Specifications (DR1050) ==
Data from Teijgeler and Bayerl

General characteristics

- Crew: one
- Capacity: three passengers
- Wingspan: 8.72 m (28 ft 7 in)
- Wing area: 13.60 m^{2} (146.4 sq ft)
- Empty weight: 440 kg (970 lb)
- Gross weight: 780 kg (1,720 lb)
- Fuel capacity: 110 litres (24 imp gal; 29 US gal), in two fuselage tanks of 55 litres (12 imp gal; 15 US gal), one front and one rear
- Powerplant: 1 × Continental O-200 four cylinder, air-cooled, four stroke aircraft engine, 75 kW (101 hp)
- Propellers: 2-bladed metal

Performance

- Maximum speed: 220 km/h (140 mph, 120 kn)
- Cruise speed: 210 km/h (130 mph, 110 kn)
- Stall speed: 88 km/h (55 mph, 48 kn)
- Rate of climb: 2.8 m/s (550 ft/min)
- Wing loading: 57.3 kg/m^{2} (11.7 lb/sq ft)
