= Robin DR500 =

DR500
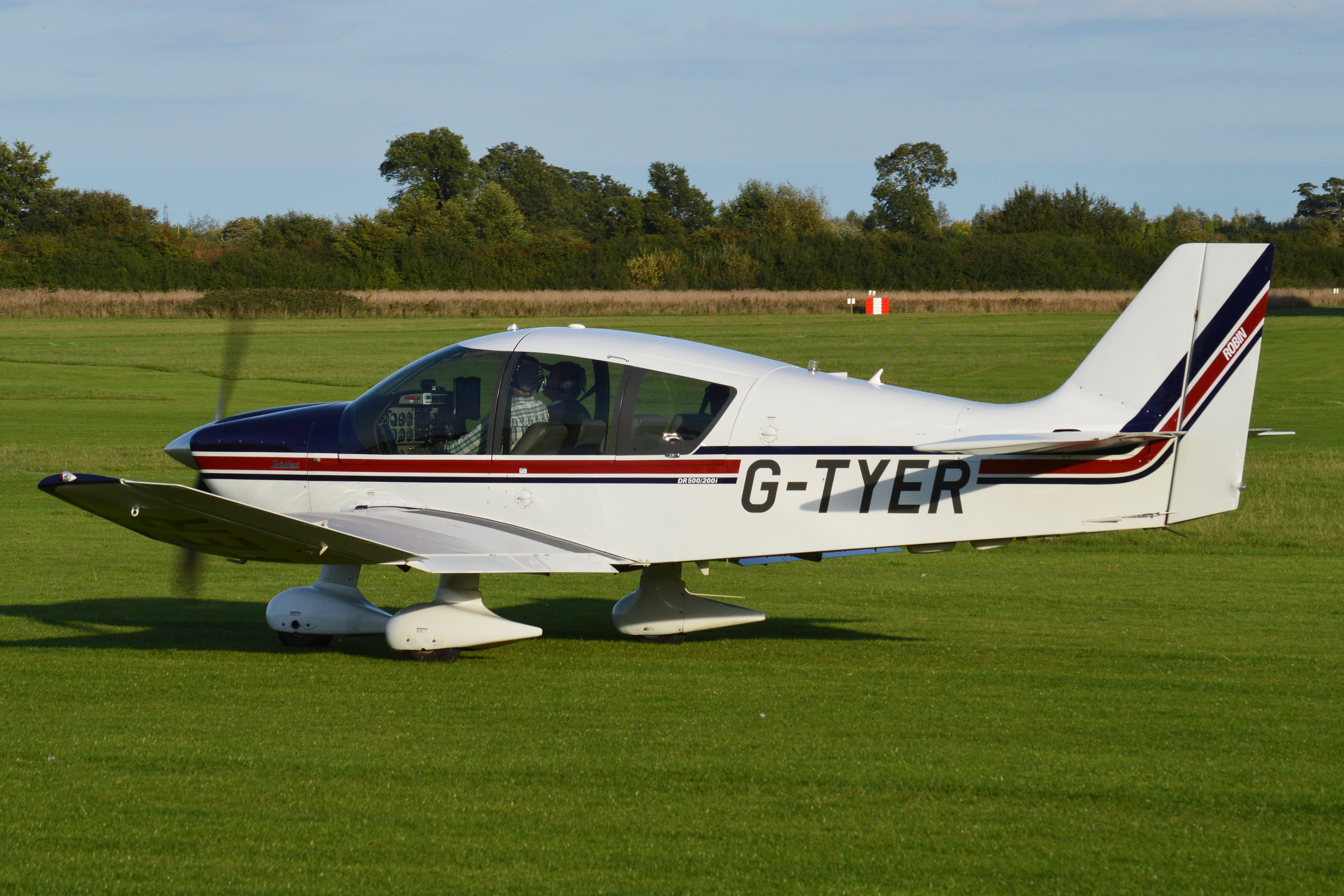

General information
- Type: Four-seat light aircraft
- Manufacturer: Avions Pierre Robin
- Number built: 27

History
- Introduction date: 1999
- First flight: 1997
- Developed from: Robin DR400

The Robin DR500 Président is a wooden low wing monoplane, manufactured by Robin Aircraft and marketed as a top-of-the-range DR400. It has a tricycle undercarriage, 4+1 seating configuration, is powered by a more powerful 200CV fuel-injected Lycoming engine and is larger and better-equipped than the standard DR400.

== Development ==
The Robin DR500 concept first originated in the 1980s as the DR.400 NGL or Nouvelle Génération Large, but the idea was not resurrected until the late 1990s by the new owners of Robin Aircraft. It took its name from the HR.100/250TR Président of 1974. Known and marketed as the DR500, it is actually an extension of the DR400's type certificate, so is sometimes referenced in official documents as the DR400/500. It was intended to fill the niche between 180 hp fixed undercarriage and 250 hp retractable undercarriage aircraft, with 1500 km range at cruise speeds of 260 km/h (140 kn). The maiden flight of prototype F-WZZY was on 29 May 1997 with Daniel Müller as test pilot. 18 were produced in 1999 and 9 in 2000.

== Design ==
Compared to the original DR400, the DR500 has a larger engine cowling and a larger bubble-like canopy like that on the R3000 or X4, making the cabin 40 cm longer, 10 cm wider at the shoulders and providing 5 cm more headroom. Like the Jodel D140, it has five seatbelts. The DR500 has a new instrument panel, finished in grey and beige, and leather seats as standard; electric trim and electrically operated flaps are also standard. The wing is slightly thicker than that on the DR400, and it benefits from new, more streamlined wheel fairings. The DR500 is powered by a fuel-injected 200 hp Lycoming driving a two-blade Hartzell variable-pitch propeller. There is a gas strut to keep the externally-accessible luggage compartment door open. Total fuel capacity is 275 litres: two 40l wing tanks, 105l under the floor, and an optional 90l tank under the baggage compartment.

== Variants ==
DR.500-200I Président
Powered by a 200 CV (197.26 hp; 147.10 kW) Lycoming IO-360-A1B6 engine

== Specifications ==
Data from Masse p. 195

General characteristics

- Crew: 1
- Capacity: 5
- Length: 7.05 m (23 ft 2 in)
- Wingspan: 8.72 m (28 ft 7.25 in)
- Height: 2.23 m (7 ft 3.75 in)
- Wing area: 14.20 m^{2} (152.85 sq ft)
- Powerplant: 1 × Lycoming IO-360-A1B6-A flat-four piston engine , 149 kW (200 hp)

Performance

- Cruise speed: 260 km/h (161 mph, 140 kn)
- Range: 1,500 km (930 mi, 810 nmi)
- Rate of climb: 5.0 m/s (1,000 ft/min)

== Bibliography ==
- Besse, Francois La Saga Robin (de 1957 à nos jours). Mayenne: Jouve, 2012.
- Masse, Xavier Avions Robin (du Jodel-Robin de 1957 au DR.500 de 2000). Paris: Nouvelles Editions Latines, 2000.
- The Illustrated Encyclopedia of Aircraft (Part Work 1982–1985), 1985, Orbis Publishing, Page 2799
- R.W.Simpson, Airlife's General Aviation, Airlife Publishing, England, 1991, ISBN 1-85310-194-X
