= Pierre Robin (designer) =

French aircraft designer (1927–2020)

- Born: 14 August 1927
- Died: 5 August 2020 (aged 92)
- Occupations: aircraft designer, entrepreneur

Pierre Robin (14 August 1927 – 5 August 2020) was a French aeroplane designer. He was known for founding the aircraft company Avions Robin with designer Jean Délémontez.

== Avions Pierre Robin ==
Avions Pierre Robin was founded in 1957 as Centre Est Aéronautique at Dijon. In 1969, the company name was changed to Avions Pierre Robin. The company manufactured a series of light airplanes, based on the designs created by Délémontez, of Jodel renown (Société Avions Jodel). The first airplane completed by Avions Pierre Robin was flown in 1967, designated DR.253 Regent.

In October 2004, Alpha Aviation Ltd (Hamilton New Zealand) purchased the jigs, tooling and intellectual rights to the Robin R2000 series. These two-place all-metal training aircraft were produced from 2005 until January 2008, when the parent company of Alpha liquidated the company assets.

Avions Pierre Robin became known as Apex after the R2000 sale. It continued to produce all its other types consisting primarily of the DR400 series.
