= Robin R3000 =

French single-engined light aircraft

R 3000
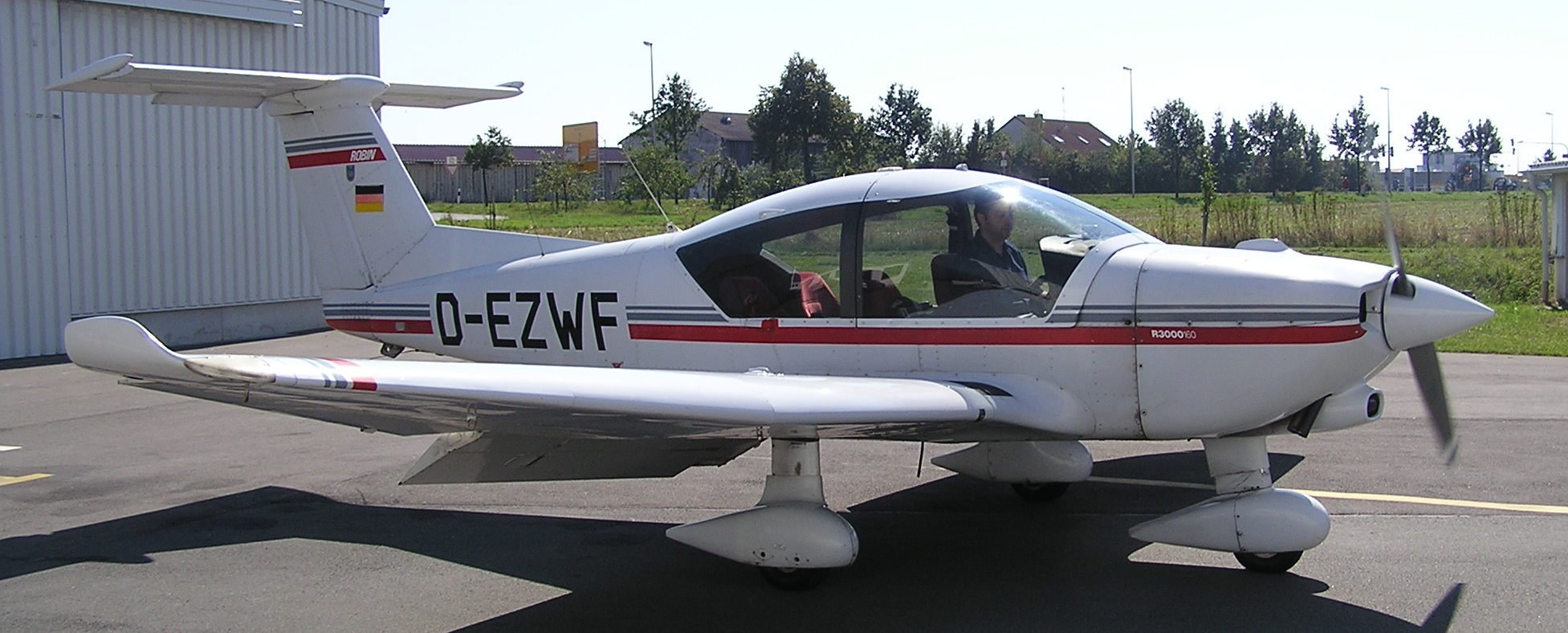
- A Robin R3000 at Herzogenaurach Airport (2004)

General information
- Type: Light aircraft
- National origin: France
- Manufacturer: Avions Robin

History
- First flight: 8 December 1980

The Robin R 3000 is a French single-engined light aircraft designed and built by Avions Robin, which entered production in the 1980s.

== Development and design ==
In 1978, Avions Robin started design of a new range of all-metal single-engined light aircraft, with a wide range of variants planned with between two and four seats, various engines and a choice of fixed or retractable undercarriage. The first prototype, a R.3140, a four-seater powered by a Lycoming O-320 flew on 8 December 1980, with the second prototype flying on 2 June 1981.

The R.3140 is a single-engined, low-wing monoplane with a fixed nosewheel undercarriage. Its wings have a similar planform to the earlier wooden Robins such as the DR400, with tapered outer wing sections. But unlike the cranked wings of these earlier aircraft, the wings of the R.3140 have constant dihedral. A forward sliding canopy covers a four-seat cockpit, while the aircraft is fitted with a distinctive T-tail.

== Operational history ==
In 1983, a marketing agreement was reached between Avions Robin and SOCATA, the light aircraft subsidiary of Aérospatiale to market the R 3000 series. This led to the planned higher power versions being abandoned, with engines limited to 119 kW (160 hp) or less to avoid competition with Socata's own TB series. The R.3140 received its type certificate on 13 October 1983.

32 had been built by the start of 1988, when the marketing agreement with SOCATA was stopped. Production continued after Robin was sold to Aéronautique Service (later to become Apex Aircraft) in mid-1988, with 76 delivered by 1998.

== Variants ==
R3000/100
Two-seat version with 86 kW (115 hp) Lycoming O-235.
R3000/120
Three seat version powered by 86 kW (115 hp) Lycoming O-235-L2A. Originally named R.3120. Production ended 1987.
R3000/140
Four seat version powered by 119 kW (160 hp) Lycoming O-320-D2A engine. Originally named R.3140.
R3000/160
Four seater powered by 119 kW (160 hp) Lycoming O-360-A3A engine.

== Specifications (R 3000/140) ==
Data from Jane's All The World's Aircraft 1988-89

General characteristics

- Crew: Two
- Capacity: 2 passengers
- Length: 7.51 m (24 ft 7.75 in)
- Wingspan: 9.81 m (32 ft 2.25 in)
- Height: 2.66 m (8 ft 8.75 in)
- Wing area: 14.47 m^{2} (155.8 sq ft)
- Aspect ratio: 6.6
- Airfoil: NACA 43015/5 on inner wing, NACA 43010.5 at tip
- Empty weight: 600 kg (1,323 lb)
- Max takeoff weight: 1,050 kg (2,315 lb)
- Fuel capacity: 160 L (42.25 US Gallon)
- Powerplant: 1 × Textron Lycoming O-320-D2A air-cooled flat-four piston engine, 119 kW (160 hp)

Performance

- Maximum speed: 250 km/h (155 mph, 135 kn) at sea level
- Cruise speed: 220 km/h (136 mph, 119 kn) (econ cruise at 65% power)
- Stall speed: 87 km/h (54 mph, 47 kn) (flaps down)
- Range: 1,185 km (736 mi, 640 nmi) (max standard fuel, no reserves, 65% power)
- Service ceiling: 4,265 m (14,000 ft)
- Rate of climb: 4.3 m/s (846 ft/min)
