= Mudry CAP 10 =

French aerobatic training aircraft

CAP 10
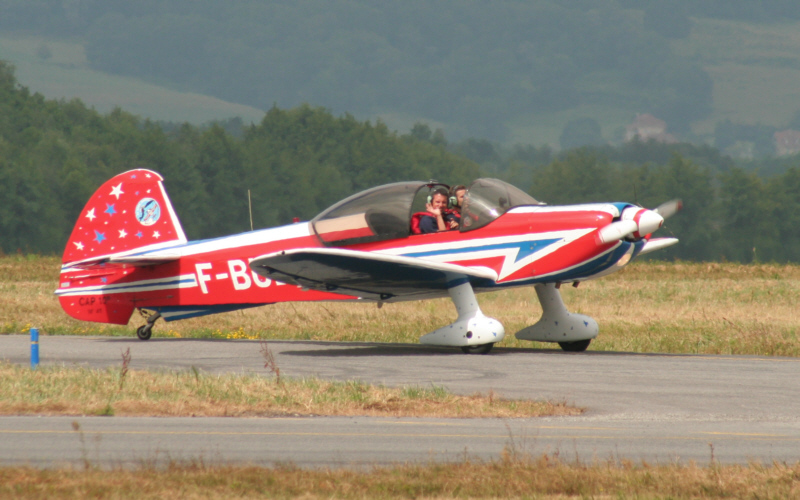
- CAP 10B #41

General information
- Type: Aerobatic aircraft
- Manufacturer: Avions Mudry & Cie; Apex Aircraft; Robin Aircraft
- Number built: 300+

History
- Manufactured: 1970-2007 and 2021-
- First flight: 1968
- Developed from: Piel Super Emeraude

The Mudry CAP 10 is a two-seat training aerobatic aircraft first built in 1970 and still in production in 2007. The plane was developed from the Piel Super Emeraude and was born as the CP100. The name changed to CAP 10, CAP for 'Constructions Aéronautiques Parisiennes'. The CAP 10 was manufactured by Mudry (name of its designer) in Bernay, France, bought by CAP Industries which then became Apex Aircraft. Following the bankruptcy of Apex in 2008, rights to produce spares were awarded to Dyn'Aviation. After the bankruptcy of DynAero in 2012, manufacture of spares was taken over by CEAPR in Darois.

== Design and development ==
In 1953, Auguste Mudry started the company C.A.A.R.P. (Cooperatives des Aleliers Aéronautiques de la Region Parisienne) near Porte de Choisy station in Paris, which was initially employed repairing gliders. The company moved to Beynes, Yvelines in 1957, and following the closure of Scintex Aviation's factory in late 1964, acquired tooling from Scintex for building the Piel Emeraude.

In early 1966, work began on a new two-seat derivative of the Super Emeraude, designated CP 100, which was designed by a team including Claude Piel, designer of the Emeraude, and the aerodynamicist Nenad Hrissafovic. The prototype CP 100, powered by a 160 hp (120 kW) Lycoming engine, first flew at Beynes on 13 August 1966. On 5 January 1967, the CP.100 crashed after breaking up in mid-air. Investigation showed that the airframe failed because the pilots attempted a barrel roll at a speed of approximately 350–400 km/h (220–250 mph; 190–220 kn), overstressing the airframe. On 22 August 1968, the first CAP 10, based on the CP 100, but with modified ailerons, a larger rudder and a larger canopy, powered by a 180 hp (130 kW) Lycoming IO-320-B2F engine. It was followed by the production variants, the CAP 10B. The CAP 10 is a low-wing cantilever monoplane of wooden construction, with the CAP 10C having a carbon sandwich wing spar.

The engine is a 180 hp (130 kW) Lycoming AEIO-360 fuel injection engine, fully lubricated in inverted flight.

300+ aircraft were built between 1970 and 2007 and an updated version of the CAP 10C is produced by Robin Aircraft as the CAP 10C NG since 2021.

The CAP 10 is one of the most successful aerobatic training aircraft in the world. About 200 aircraft are still flying in the late 2000s and nearly two generations of aerobatic champions made their classes with it.

In the late 70's the CAP 10 was developed to the single seater family of the CAP 20, 20L and 21. In the 1980s, a far derivative was the most successful family of the Cap 23x competition single seaters.

== Variants ==
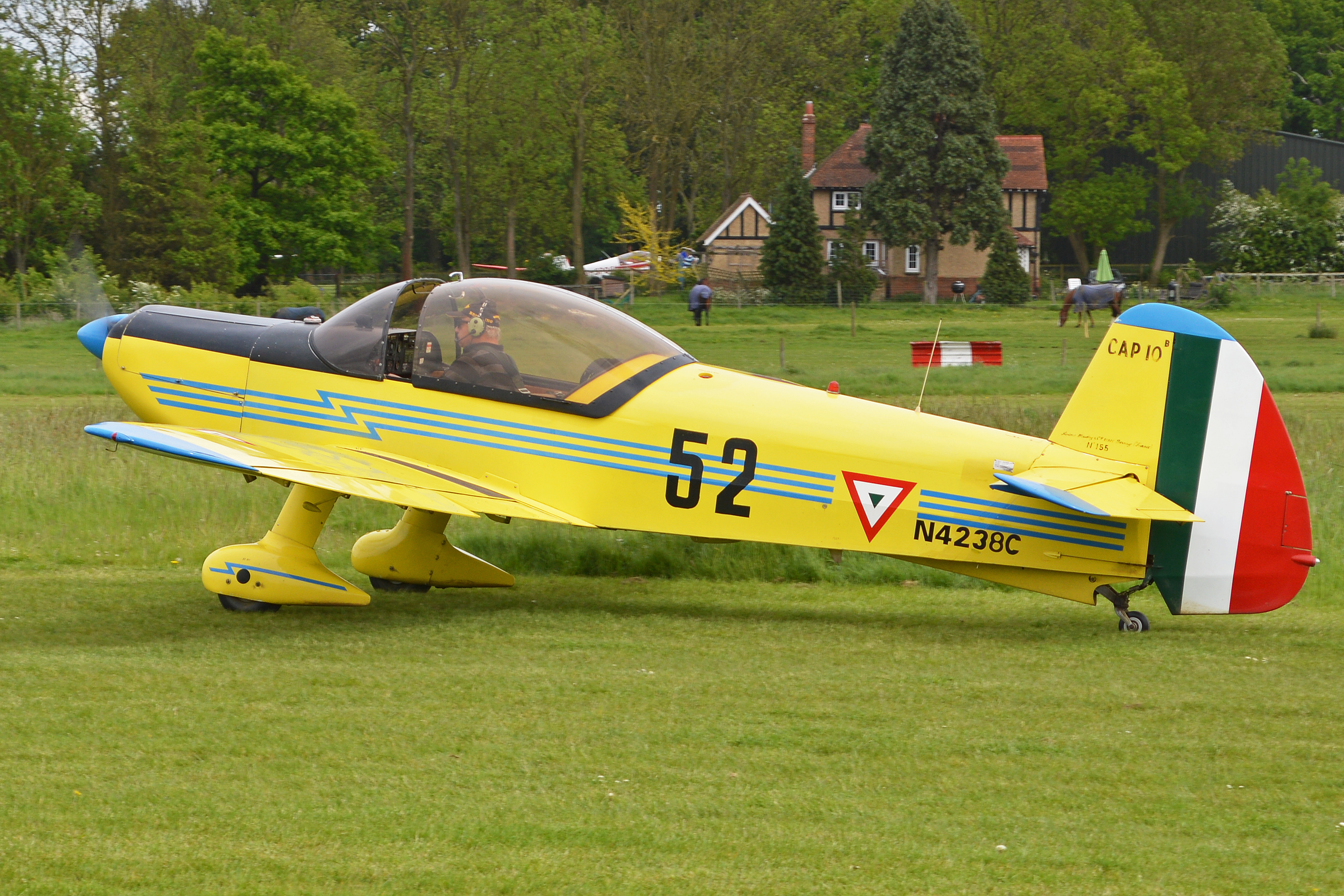
Mudry CAP-10B (N4238C) at the Old Warden Aerodrome. This aircraft initially operated with the Mexican Air Force with the registration number EPC-52, is currently operated by a private owner

C.A.A.R.P. C.P.100
Two prototype aircraft developed from the Piel Emeraude
CAP 10
Initial production aircraft. One built, which was fundamentally the third prototype.
CAP 10B
Later production aircraft with ventral fin and enlarged rudder
CAP 10C
Improved structure with carbon-fibre wing spar.
CAP 10C NG
Updated version of the CAP 10C in production since 2021.
CAP 10R
(R for Remorqueur-Tow Plane- ) Prototype of a glider tug version
CAP 10S
The French Navy ordered six copies of a special version, the CAP-10S, which entered service in 1980 with the SIV (Flight Initiation Section) in Fréjus-Saint-Raphaël, then equipped the 51S squadron in Rochefort-Sur-Mer. Today, they equip the EIP 50S at Lanvéoc-Poulmic and are used to assess and select naval aviation students.
CAP 10B/K
The exact same model as the CAP 10B modified through the implementation of a modification of the main wing spar approved under "MAJOR REPAIR DESIGN APPROVAL 10045153" by the EASA. This modification has been developed by the French Company Air-Menuiserie in 2013 and allows the CAP 10B/K to recover its flight envelope limitations (Maximum G-Force: +6.5G -4.5G).

== Operators ==
=== Military ===
France

- French Air and Space Force
- French Navy

Morocco
Used to equip Equipe Voltige aerobatic display team.
Mexico
The Mexican Air Force bought 20
South Korea
Australia
3 operated by BAE Training Systems in Tamworth as part of the flight screening process on behalf of the Royal Australian Air Force, Royal Australian Navy and the Australian Army.

=== Civilian ===
More than 200 were built, mostly for aero-clubs all around the world. A huge number of European champions have started aerobatics on a Cap 10.

== Specifications (CAP 10B) ==
Data from Jane's All The World's Aircraft 1988-89

General characteristics

- Crew: 2
- Length: 7.16 m (23 ft 6 in)
- Wingspan: 8.06 m (26 ft 5 in)
- Height: 2.55 m (8 ft 4 in)
- Wing area: 10.85 m^{2} (116.8 sq ft)
- Airfoil: NACA 23012
- Empty weight: 540 kg (1,190 lb)
- Max takeoff weight: 760 kg (1,676 lb)
- Fuel capacity: 72 L (19 US gal; 16 imp gal) + optional auxiliary tank of 75 L (20 US gal; 16 imp gal) capacity
- Powerplant: 1 × Lycoming AEIO-360-B2F 4-cylinder air-cooled, horizontally opposed, fuel injected piston engine, 134 kW (180 hp)
- Propellers: 2-bladed Hoffmann fixed pitch wooden propeller

Performance

- Maximum speed: 270 km/h (170 mph, 150 kn)
- Cruise speed: 260 km/h (160 mph, 140 kn) 75% power
- Stall speed: 100 km/h (62 mph, 54 kn) flaps up
  85 km/h (53 mph; 46 kn) flaps down
- Never exceed speed: 344 km/h (214 mph, 186 kn)
- Range: 1,200 km (750 mi, 650 nmi)
- Service ceiling: 5,000 m (16,000 ft)
- g limits: +6 -4.5
- Rate of climb: 6 m/s (1,200 ft/min) max at sea level

== See also ==
Aircraft of comparable role, configuration, and era

- Alpha 2000
- Extra 200
- Van's RV-7
