= Robin X4 =

French experimental aircraft

X4

General information
- Type: Experimental four-seat light aircraft
- National origin: France
- Manufacturer: Avions Robin
- Number built: 1

History
- First flight: 25 February 1991

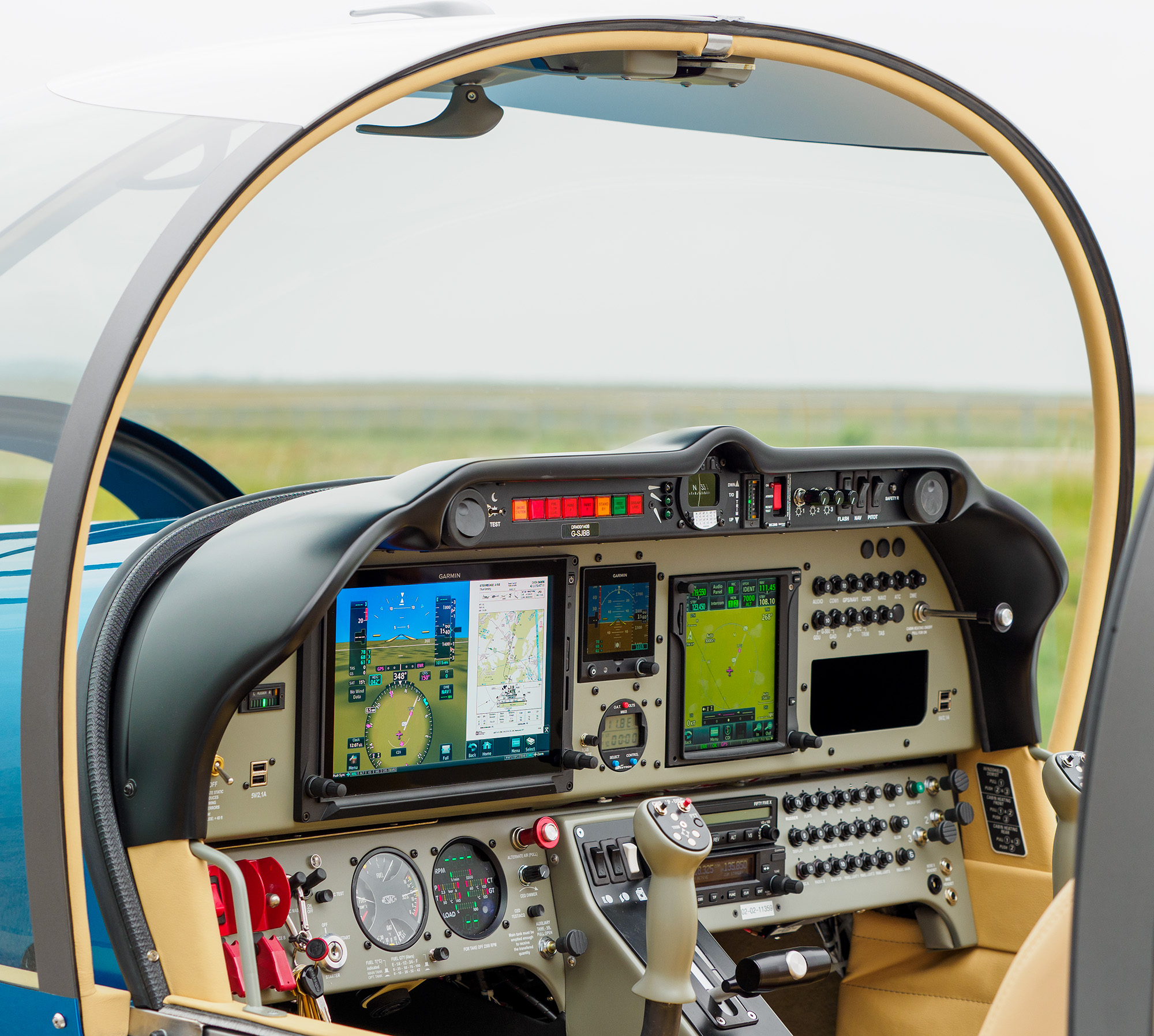
Panel of an IFR equipped Robin DR401 155CDI

The Robin X4 was an experimental French four-seat light aircraft designed and built by Avions Robin to test different wing configurations and construction materials. The X4 was a low-wing monoplane with a tricycle landing gear and powered by a 116 hp (87 kW) Textron Lycoming engine.

== Design and development ==
Originally designed as a 4-seat ATL aircraft, and at the time called the ATL II or ATL.FAR23, it was later intended to become a long-term replacement for the DR.400 series of aircraft. After Pierre Robin sold his company, the name was changed to X4, X for experimental and 4 for 4-seater; the design was also changed from the ATL's V tail to a more conventional cruciform type. The fuselage was fibreglass and epoxy in a Nomex sandwich, which allowed more fluid curves, and was generally triangular in cross-section, like the Me 262. The landing gear was from a DR.400, and the forward-tilting canopy from an ATL. The wings were wood and fabric, like those of a standard DR.400, but of constant dihedral; the wooden construction allowed modifications to be made quickly and cheaply. The rudder and ailerons were of metal construction.

It first flew on 25 February 1991, with Robin head of development Daniel Müller at the controls; whilst designed as a four-seater, only the front two seats were installed with the rear being taken up with test equipment. The airframe was used to test various wing profiles, especially laminar flow; the feasibility of producing a composite-material aircraft; and to test new systems (e.g. rod rather than cable controls).

Testing at Saint-Cyr showed a slight advantage to the X4 when compared to the equivalent DR.400/120, despite, according to Müller, its 'tired' engine. For example, optimisation of the cowling reduced engine cooling drag by 20%, or 5% of global drag; in total there was a 25 km/h gain in cruise speed. However, the improved performance came at the cost of a non-benign stall unsuitable for a training aircraft. According to Robin and Besse, the airframe was capable of eventually being a whole series up to 4+2 seat configuration with correspondingly larger engines, and be a potential competitor to the Cirrus SR22. The new owners of Avions Robin were not interested in the design, and it was ultimately scrapped.

== Variants ==
Robin X4
Lycoming 116hp O-235N engine, registration F-WKQX; one built; voluntarily destroyed
