= Robin Aiglon =

R.1180 Aiglon
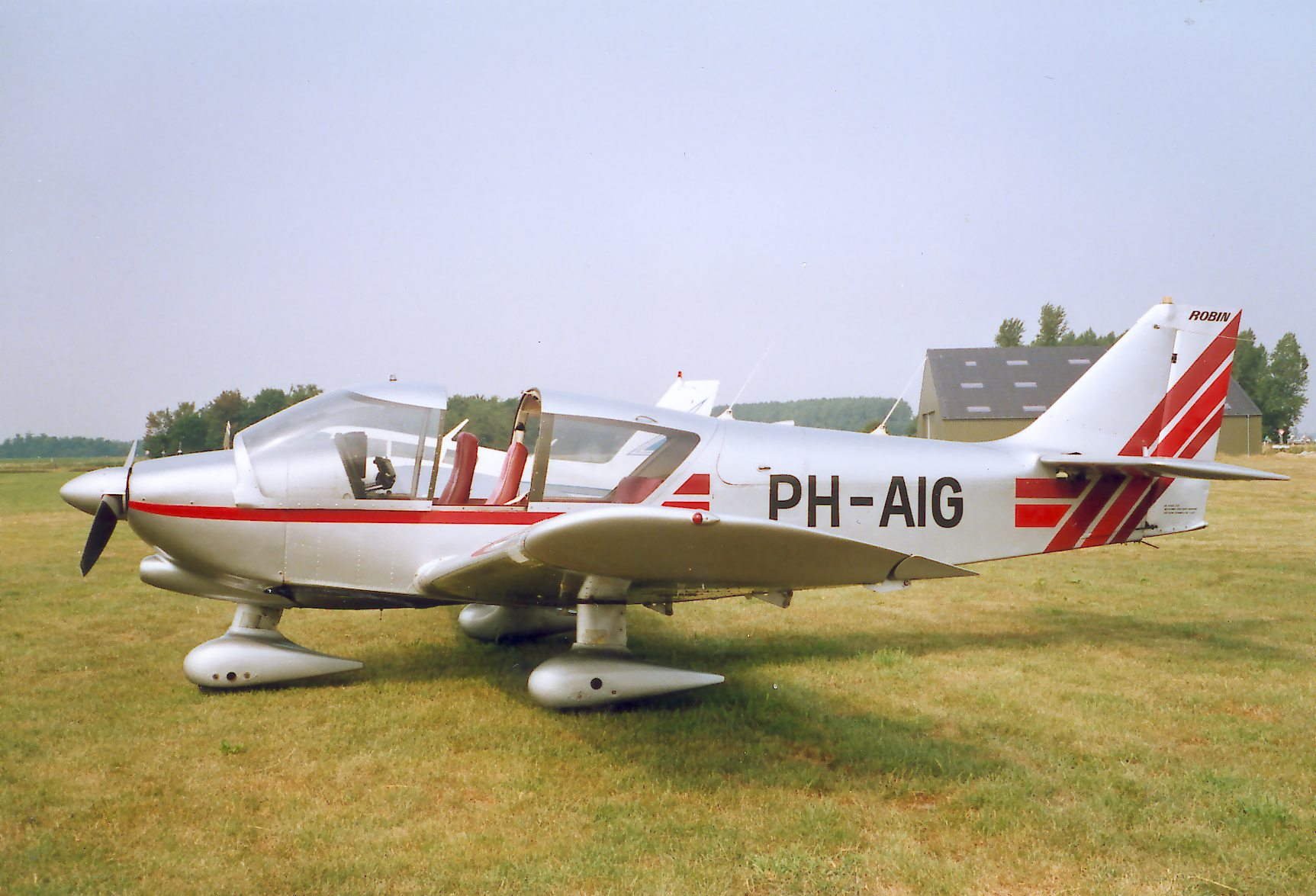
- Robin R.1180TD Aiglon PH-AIG at Midden-Zeeland Airfield (EHMZ), August 4, 1990

General information
- Type: Four-seat touring and training monoplane
- National origin: France
- Manufacturer: Avions Robin
- Number built: 67

History
- First flight: 1977
- Developed from: Robin HR100

The Robin R.1180 Aiglon is a French four-seat touring and training monoplane designed and built by Avions Robin.

== Development ==
The Aiglon is an all-metal low-wing monoplane with a fixed tricycle landing gear and powered by a nose-mounted 180 hp (134 kW) Lycoming O-360-A3AD or a Lycoming O-360-A3A engine. It was based on the early HR100 but had a lighter airframe and new fin and rudder. The prototype first flew on 25 March 1977 and the production version with detail improvements was certified on 19 September 1978.

== Variants ==
R.1180 Aiglon
Prototype, one built
R.1180T Aiglon
Production variant with longer cabin side windows, 30 built
R.1180TD Aiglon II
A R.1180T with a new instrument panel, improved cabin furnishing and an external baggage locker, 36 built

== Specifications (R.1180) ==
Data from Orbis.

General characteristics

- Crew: 1
- Capacity: 3
- Length: 7.26 m (23 ft 9.75 in)
- Wingspan: 9.08 m (29 ft 9.5 in)
- Height: 2.38 m (7 ft 9.75 in)
- Wing area: 15.10 m^{2} (162.54 sq ft)
- Empty weight: 650 kg (1,433 lb)
- Gross weight: 1,150 kg (2,535 lb)
- Powerplant: 1 × Lycoming O-360-A3AD flat-four piston engine , 134 kW (180 hp)

Performance

- Maximum speed: 251 km/h (156 mph, 136 kn)
- Range: 1,625 km (1,009 mi, 877 nmi)
- Service ceiling: 5,030 m (16,505 ft)

== See also ==
Related development

- Robin HR100
