= Robin HR100 =

Robin HR.100
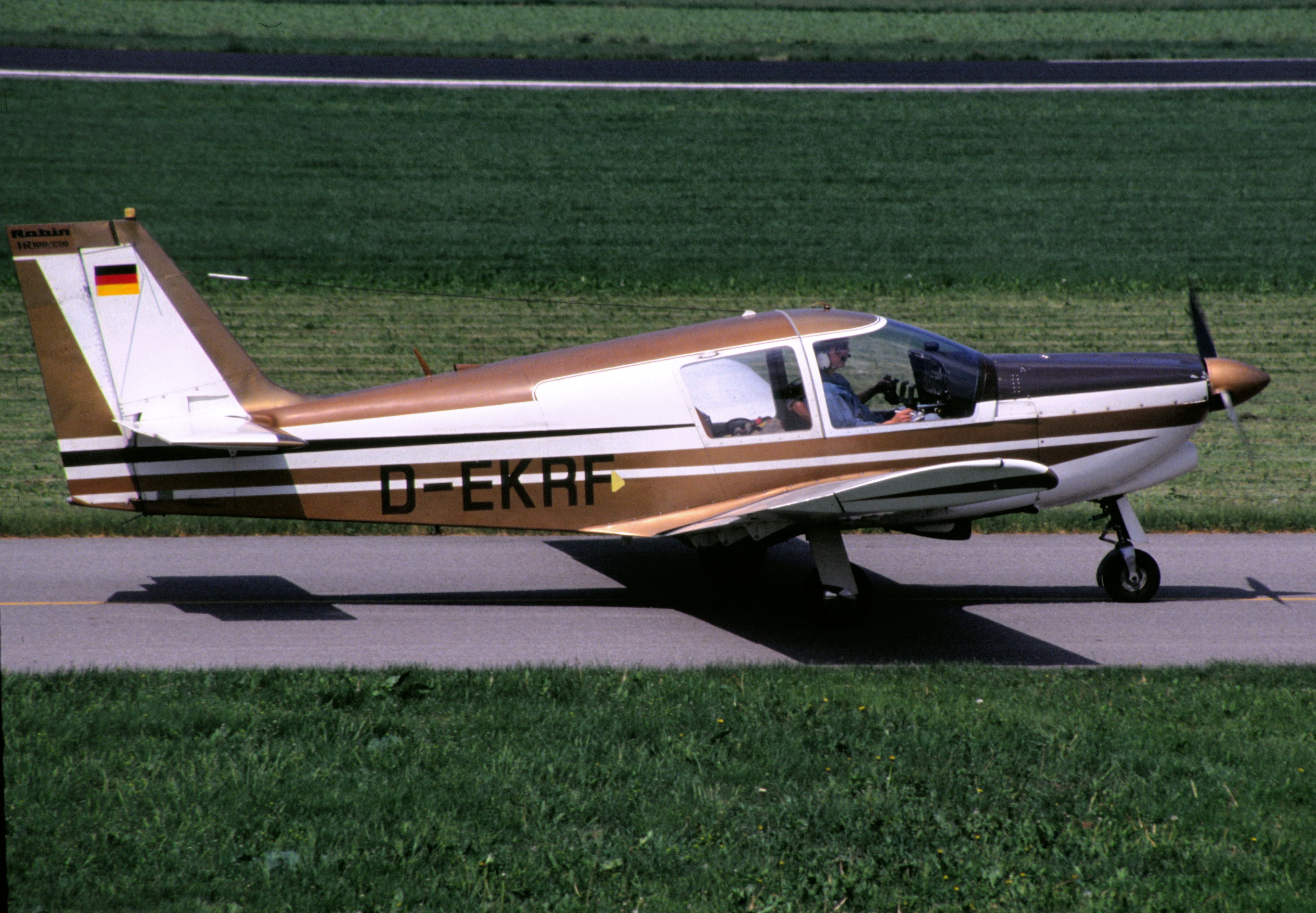
- Robin HR.100/250TR Tiara aircraft D-EKRF, at Lelystad Airport (EHLE), 22 May 1993

General information
- Type: Four-seat light monoplane
- National origin: France
- Manufacturer: Avions Pierre Robin
- Designer: Chris Heintz
- Number built: 178

History
- Manufactured: 1969-1976
- First flight: 1969
- Developed from: Robin DR.200

The Robin HR100 is a French four-seat light monoplane, designed by Chris Heintz and built by Avions Pierre Robin as a metal-winged version of the Robin DR253 Regent.

== Development ==
The prototype of the Robin HR100 was the prototype DR253 Regent which was rebuilt with metal wings and powered by a 180 hp (134 kW) Lycoming O-360 engine. It first flew on 3 April 1969 as the Robin HR100/180. The HR100 is a low-wing cantilever monoplane with a conventional cantilever tail unit and a fixed tricycle landing gear. A number of different variants were produced in the 1970s. From 1972 a high-powered improved version was produced as the HR100/285 with a 285 hp (213 kW) Continental Tiara 6-285B engine and retractable landing gear and airframe modifications.

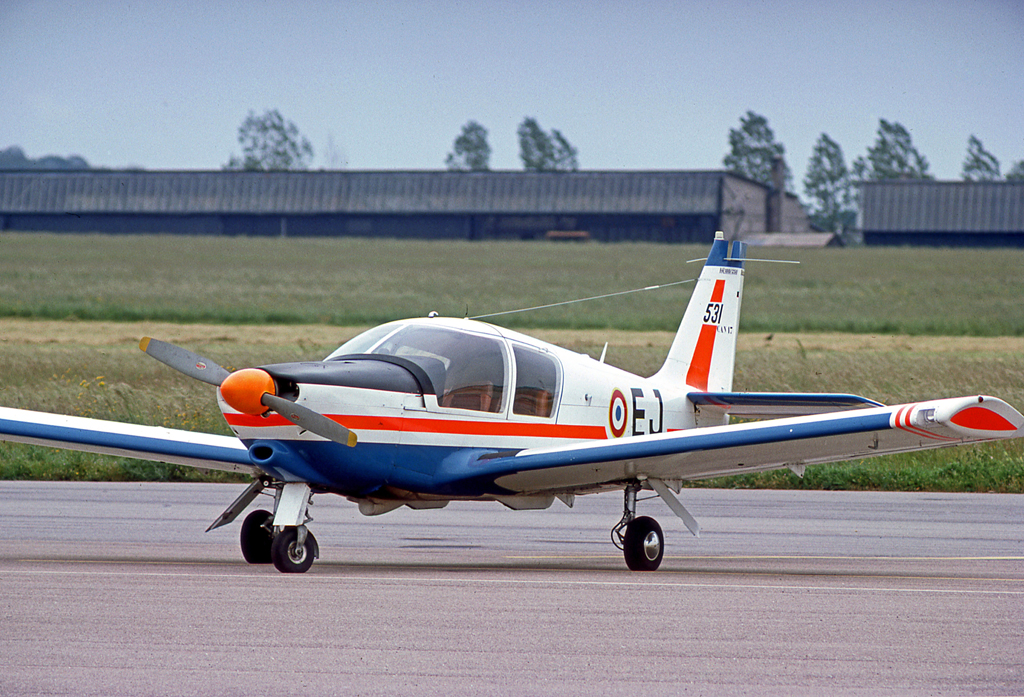
French Air Force HR.100/250 communications aircraft at Nancy Essey airfield in 1977

The French Air Force ordered a number of HR.100/250 aircraft in the mid 1970s and these were used for communications and other duties.

A two-seat trainer version was developed as the HR200, and a modified version with a lighter airframe and new fin and rudder was developed as the R1180 Aiglon in 1977.

== Variants ==
HR.100 Royal
1969 Prototype with a 180hp (134kW) Lycoming O-360 engine, one built.
HR.100/180
1976 Prototype with a 180hp (134kW) Lycoming O-360 engine, one built.
HR.100/200B Royal
Initial production version with a 200hp (149kW) Lycoming IO-360 engine.
HR.100/210 Safari
Production version with a 210hp (157kW) engine, 113 built of both 200B Royal and 210 Safari variants.
HR.100/235TR
Experimental HR.100 with an enlarged tail and retractable landing gear and a 235hp Lycoming O-540-B engine, one built.
HR.100/250TR
HR.100/235 with a 250hp (186kW) Lycoming IO-540-C4B5 engine, 24 built.
HR.100/285TR Tiara
HR.100/235 with a 285hp (213kW) Continental Tiara 6-285 engine, 37 built
HR.100/320 4+2
Experimental version with two extra children's seats, one built

== Operators ==
=== Military operators ===
France

- French Air Force
- French Navy

== Specifications (HR.100/285) ==
Data from Jane's All the World's Aircraft 1976–77

General characteristics

- Crew: 1
- Capacity: 3–4 passengers
- Length: 7.59 m (24 ft 11 in)
- Wingspan: 9.08 m (29 ft 9 in)
- Height: 2.71 m (8 ft 11 in)
- Wing area: 15.20 m^{2} (163.6 sq ft)
- Aspect ratio: 5.36:1
- Airfoil: NACA 64A515 (modified)
- Empty weight: 840 kg (1,852 lb)
- Max takeoff weight: 1,400 kg (3,086 lb)
- Fuel capacity: 440 L (97 imp gal; 120 US gal)
- Powerplant: 1 × Teledyne Continental Tiara 6-285 flat-six, 213 kW (285 hp)
- Propellers: 3-bladed Hoffmann wooden constant-speed propeller, 2.00 m (6 ft 7 in) diameter

Performance

- Maximum speed: 325 km/h (202 mph, 175 kn) at sea level
- Cruise speed: 293 km/h (182 mph, 158 kn) (65% power)
- Stall speed: 110 km/h (68 mph, 59 kn) (flaps down)
- Never exceed speed: 360 km/h (220 mph, 190 kn)
- Range: 2,344 km (1,456 mi, 1,266 nmi) (econ. cruise)
- Service ceiling: 5,700 m (18,700 ft)
- Rate of climb: 6.0 m/s (1,180 ft/min)
- Takeoff run to 15 m (50 ft): 600 m (1,970 ft)
- Landing run from 15 m (50 ft): 660 m (2,170 ft)

== See also ==
Related development

- Robin DR.200
