= Apex Aircraft =

French company

- Company type: Private
- Industry: Aerospace manufacturer
- Fate: Liquidation (2008); acquired by CEAPR
- Successor: Robin Aircraft
- Headquarters: France
- Products: Robin DR400; Robin R2000; CAP 10; CAP 20; CAP 230

Apex Aircraft was a French company devoted to light aeroplane manufacture. It markets three ranges of light aircraft which it brands Robin, Alpha and CAP. The "Robin" range is the former Avions Robin DR400 4-seater aircraft of wooden construction, the "Alpha" range is the former Avions Robin R2000 all-metal 2-seater aircraft series, and the "CAP" range is the former Mudry/CAP Aviation's (Constructions Aéronautiques Parisiennes) CAP-10 training and CAP-232 single seater high performance aerobatic aircraft.

The Robin R2000 type certificates and manufacturing equipment have been transferred to Alpha Aviation in New Zealand together with marketing rights outside Europe. The aircraft is marketed by them as the Alpha 2000 and they continue to supply the aircraft and parts to Apex.

In September 2008 Apex went into liquidation. Apex Aircraft was acquired by CEAPR (Centre-Est Aéronautique Pierre Robin) in late 2008. Supplies of spares resumed in March 2009. Aircraft manufacturing resumed in 2012 under the name Robin Aircraft.

== Aircraft ==
- Mudry CAP 10
- Mudry CAP 20
- Mudry CAP 230
