= Robin Aircraft =

Aircraft manufacturer in France

- Industry: Aerospace
- Predecessor: Apex Aircraft
- Founded: May 2011
- Headquarters: Darois, France,
- Products: Fixed-wing aircraft
- Owner: Centre-Est Aéronautique; Avions Pierre Robin (CEAPR)
- Website: robin-aircraft.com

Robin Aircraft is a French manufacturer of light aircraft. It is the successor to Centre-Est Aéronautique, Avions Pierre Robin and Apex Aircraft (Avions Robin and Robin Aviation).

== History ==
Centre-Est Aéronautique was formed by Pierre Robin and Jean Délémontez, the principal designer of Jodel aircraft, in October 1957. It began manufacturing aircraft at Darois, near Dijon, France.

The first aircraft was designed by Robin and Délémontez. It was based on the D10, a four-seater designed by Édouard Joly and Délémontez at Jodel, that was shelved when work on the Jodel D11 became more urgent. In collaboration with Robin it became the 'Jodel Robin'. It later became the DR100 model (Jodel's models all had D followed by a number). Robin and Délémontez continued to upgrade the design between 1957 and 1972.

The DR100 range was succeeded by the DR200 range. Production continued in November 1970 under the name Avions Pierre Robin.

The Robin DR400 first flew in 1972 and is still in production. It has a tricycle undercarriage and can carry 4 people. The DR aircraft have the 'cranked wing' configuration, in which the dihedral angle of the outer wing is much greater than the inboard, a configuration which they share with Jodel aircraft. The best known today is the popular DR400, which is a wooden sport monoplane, conceived by Pierre Robin and Jean Délémontez.

The Robin HR200 had a different designer, Chris Heintz, and is fully metallic unlike the wooden DR series. It is a light aerobatic aircraft aimed at flight training. The Robin R2000 series was developed from the HR200 and is produced as the Alpha 2000 by Alpha Aviation in Hamilton, New Zealand, since 2004.

Avions Pierre Robin was acquired by Apex Aircraft of France in 1988. Aircraft continued to be manufactured at Darois under the names Avions Robin and Robin Aviation.

By 2008, about half of the production were fitted with diesel engines supplied by Thielert. Thielert went into liquidation because of alleged fraud, cutting off the engine supply to Apex Aircraft. Thielert were taken over by a receiver, and the price of engines and parts was increased. This pushed the price of finished aircraft too high for the market to bear, with the result that Apex Aircraft went into liquidation in 2008. CEAPR, based in the same premises at Darois and responsible for making the components for Apex Aircraft, continued to supply parts.

Aircraft manufacturing resumed in May 2011 under the name Robin Aircraft. (All type certificates are held by CEAPR.)

The company offers the DR401 aircraft, a DR400 upgraded with a glass cockpit, larger cockpit, electric trim and flaps, and available with several engine options.

The company also offers the aerobatic aircraft CAP 10C NG, an updated version of the Mudry CAP 10. The type certificate was transferred to CEAPR in 2015, and the first aircraft was delivered in 2021.

Robin Aircraft reported bonding issues in seven batches of DR400 wing spars in December 2022. Emergency Airworthiness Directive 2022-0267-E was issued by EASA on 27 December 2022. This EAD was reviewed by EASA following submission of data that showed that all the wing spars exceeded their design specification. The Airworthiness Directive was finally cancelled on 12 June 2024. In their Cancellation Notice, EASA stated: "investigations carried out have shown that the bonding of the main wing spars…is acceptable and does not constitute an unsafe condition".

The EAD nevertheless precipitated Robin Aircraft being placed in safeguard on 22 February 2023, in receivership on 12 September 2023 and in liquidation on 16 November 2023.

In December 2023, however, CEAPR re-hired half of the Robin Aircraft company's workforce to resume production of Robin and CAP aircraft. CEAPR already made or bought all the components for Robin and CAP aircraft and owns the land and the buildings at the facility in Darois, the Type Certificates and the Robin Aircraft name. CEAPR has Part APDOA, Part CAO and Part 21G. It has been operating in Darois for over sixty years with a core business of design and approvals, parts manufacture and maintenance. CEAPR was granted a Production Approval Certificate by the DGAC on 24 September 2024 for the manufacture of new aircraft.

== Aircraft ==
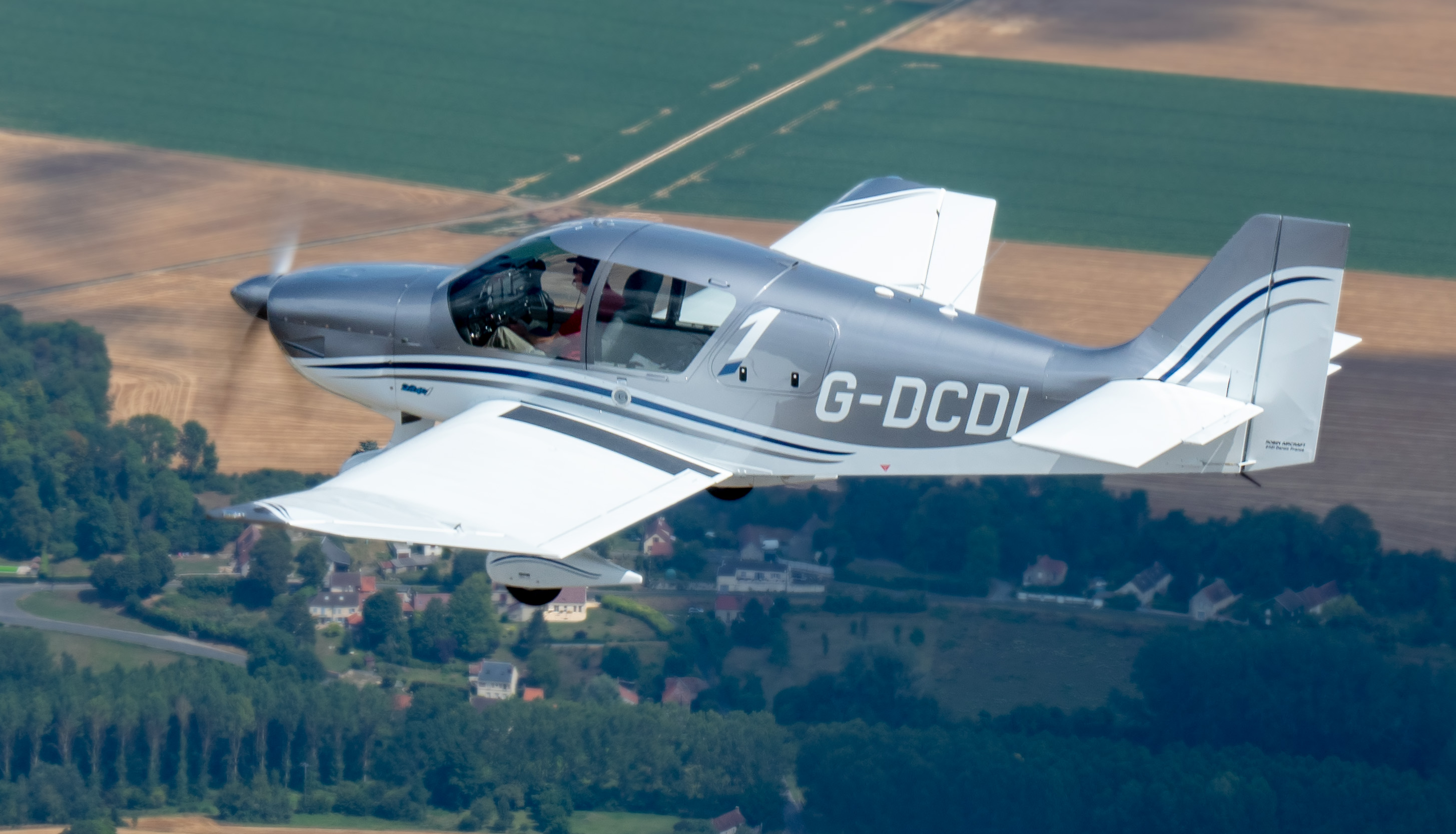
Robin DR401 155CDI

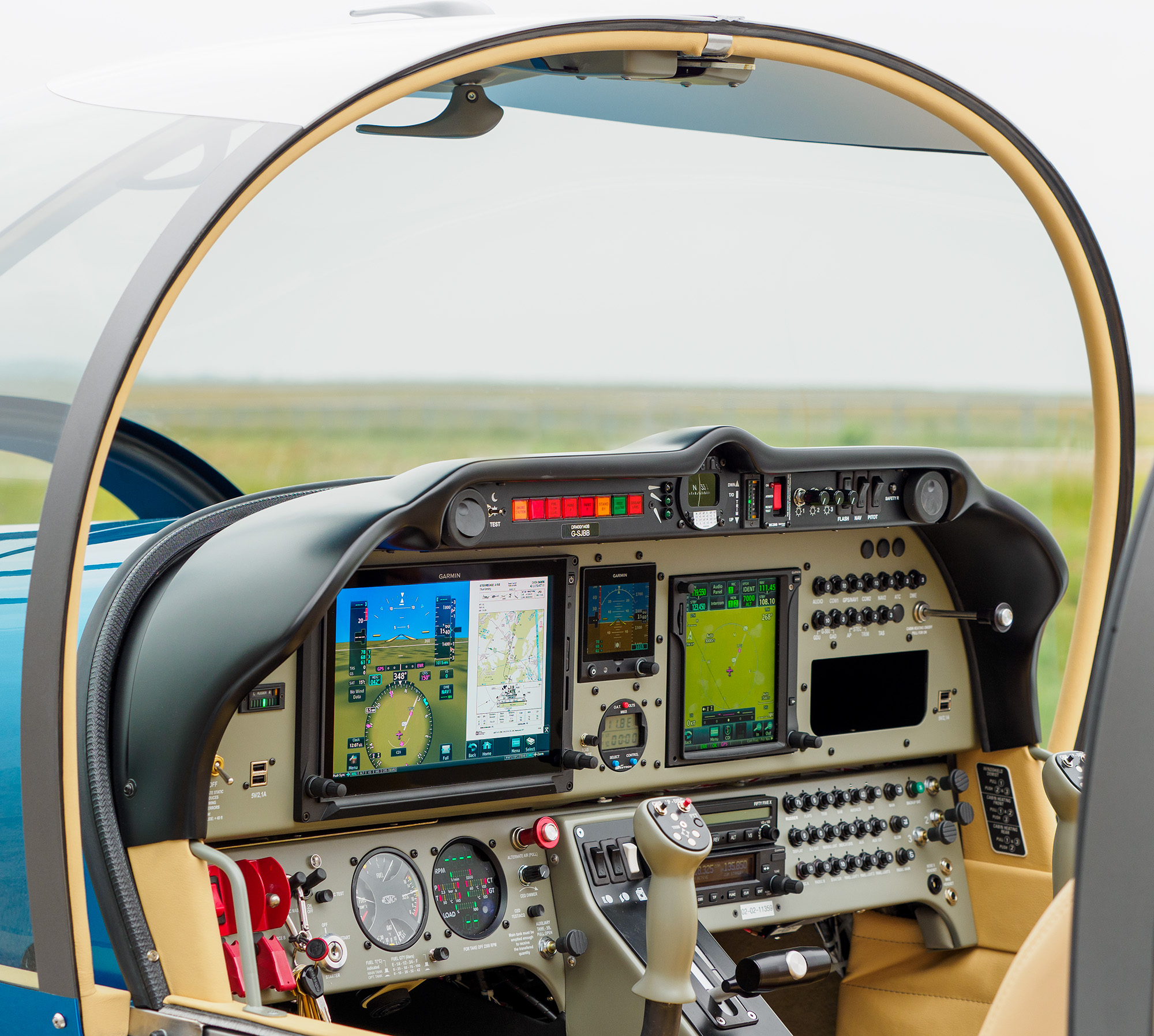
Robin DR401 155CDI IFR panel

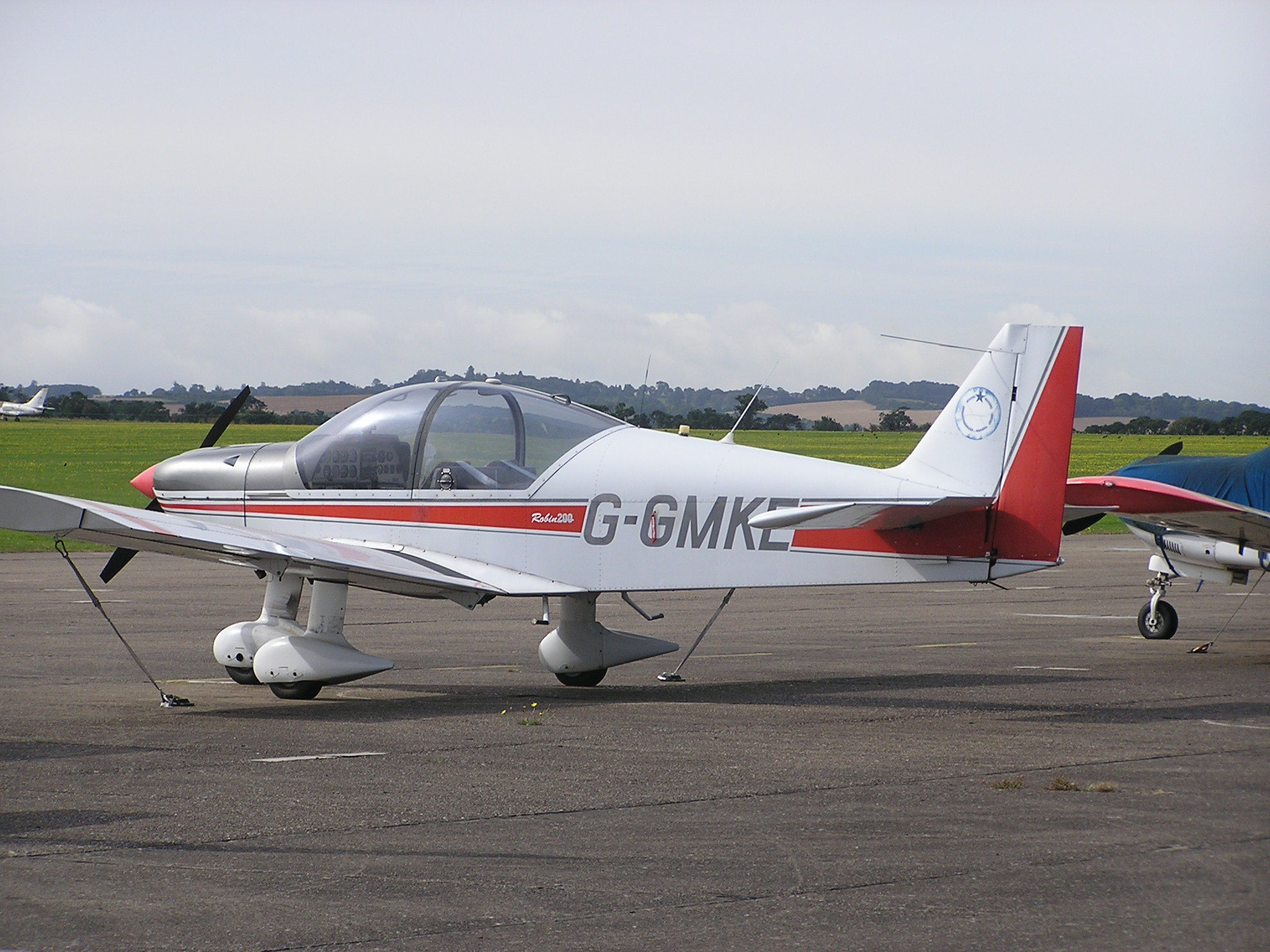
Robin HR200 120B

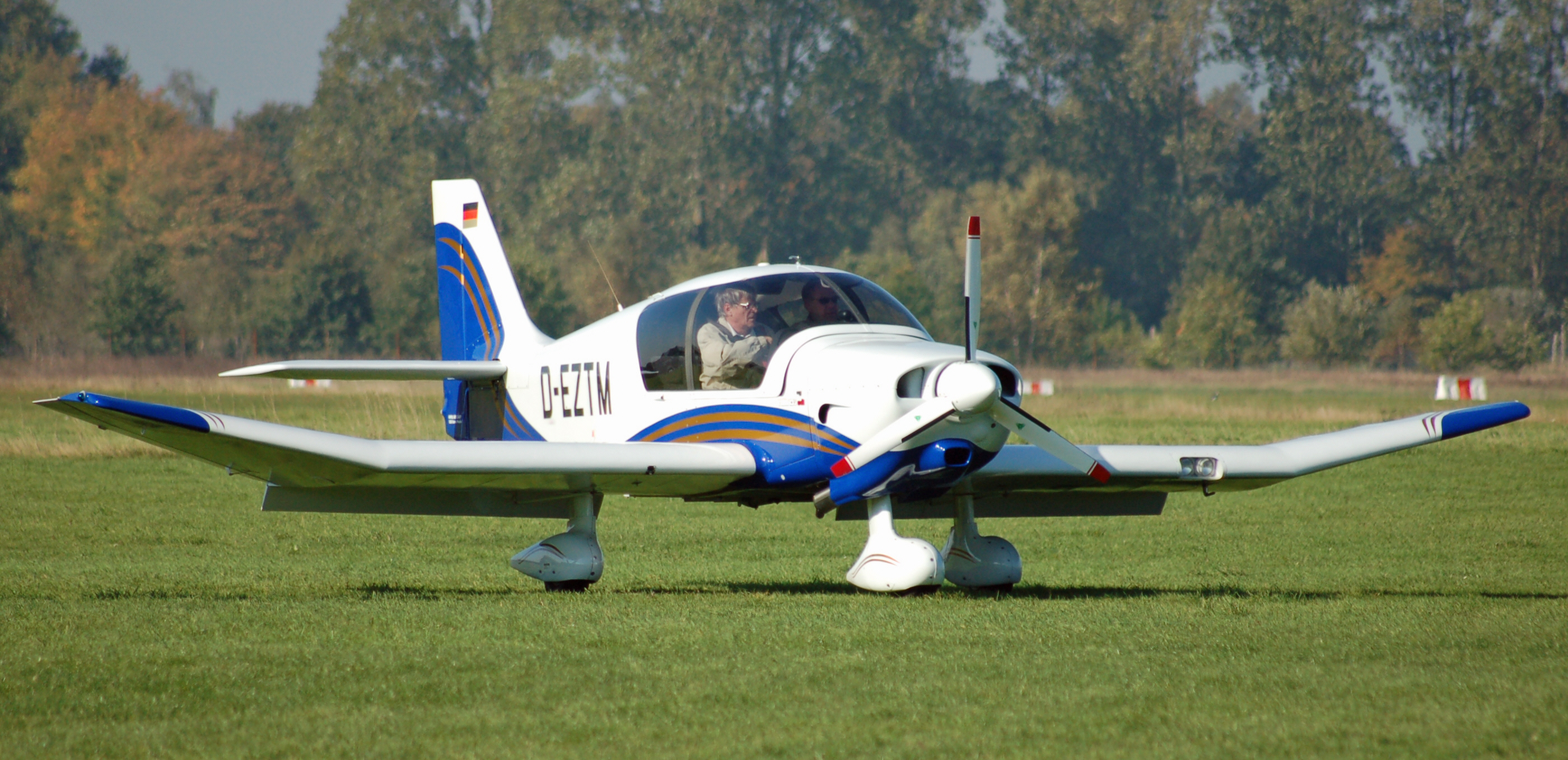
Robin DR400 EcoFlyer 135CDI

The DR401, with a wider cabin and electric flaps and trim, was introduced at AERO Friedrichshafen on 9 April 2014.

- Robin ATL
- CAP 10C NG
- Robin DR100
- Robin DR200
- Robin DR300
- Robin DR400
- Robin DR500
- Robin HR100
- Robin HR200
- Robin R1000
- Robin R2000
- Robin R3000
- Robin X4
