= Alpha Aviation =

Alpha Aviation is an aircraft manufacturing company based in Hamilton, New Zealand. It manufactures the Alpha 2000 range of light aircraft. The company was formed by a group of entrepreneurs who have purchased the rights to Apex Aircraft's Alpha R2000 aircraft, originally manufactured by Avions Robin. The aircraft is now being marketed as the 120T and 160A variants by Alpha (as well as the 160Ai, a 160A with a fuel-injected engine.)

The first aircraft manufactured (ZK-FXY) had its initial flight on 12 April 2006. The first production Alpha 160A aircraft (ZK-WKF and -WJH) entered service with Waikato Aero Club, based just across the road from Alpha at Hamilton Airport, in September/October 2006. Alpha expanded its production facilities in Hamilton, with an extension to the hangar being put in place in November 2006.

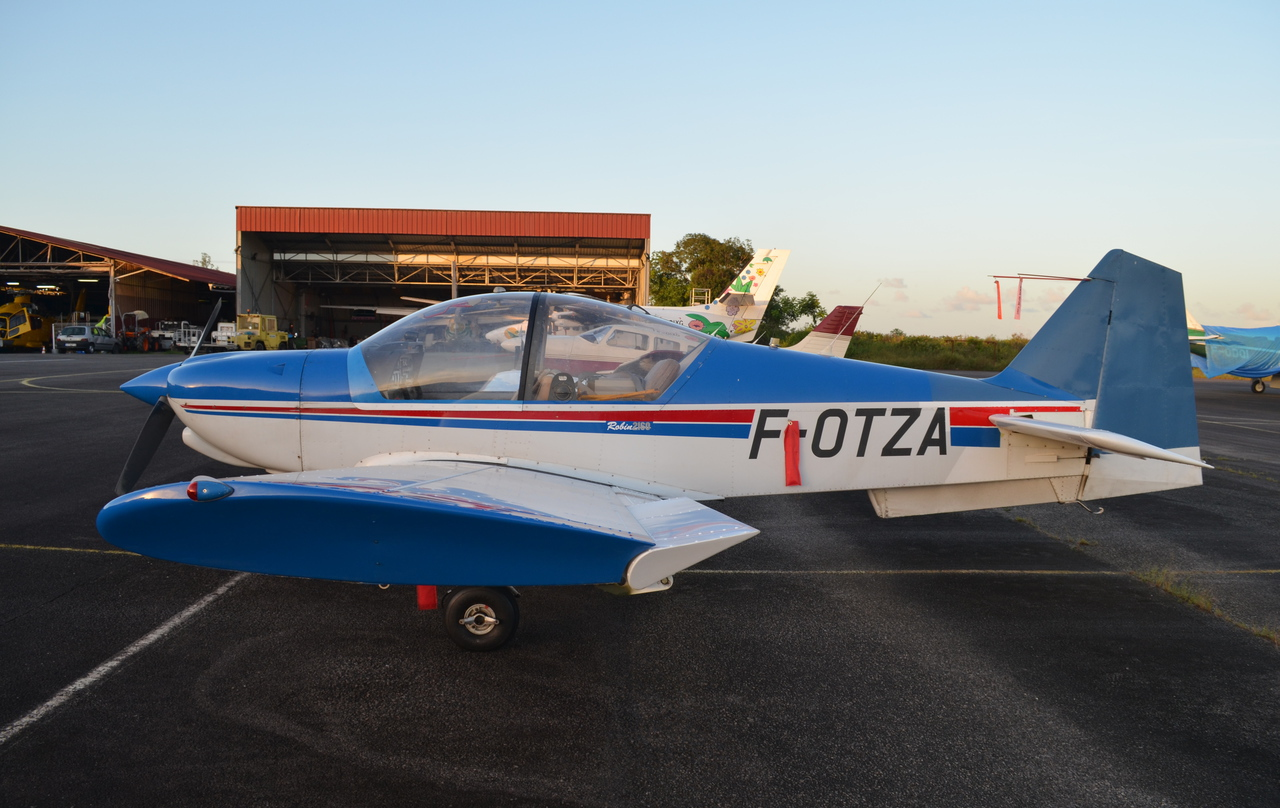
A French registered Alpha 2000

On 23 June 2009, it was announced that Alpha Aviation was sold to Hong Kong-based company, IXL Limited, which intends to restart manufacturing planes at Alpha Aviation's Hamilton Airport-based factory.
