= Robin ATL =

Sportplane family by Avions Robin

ATL
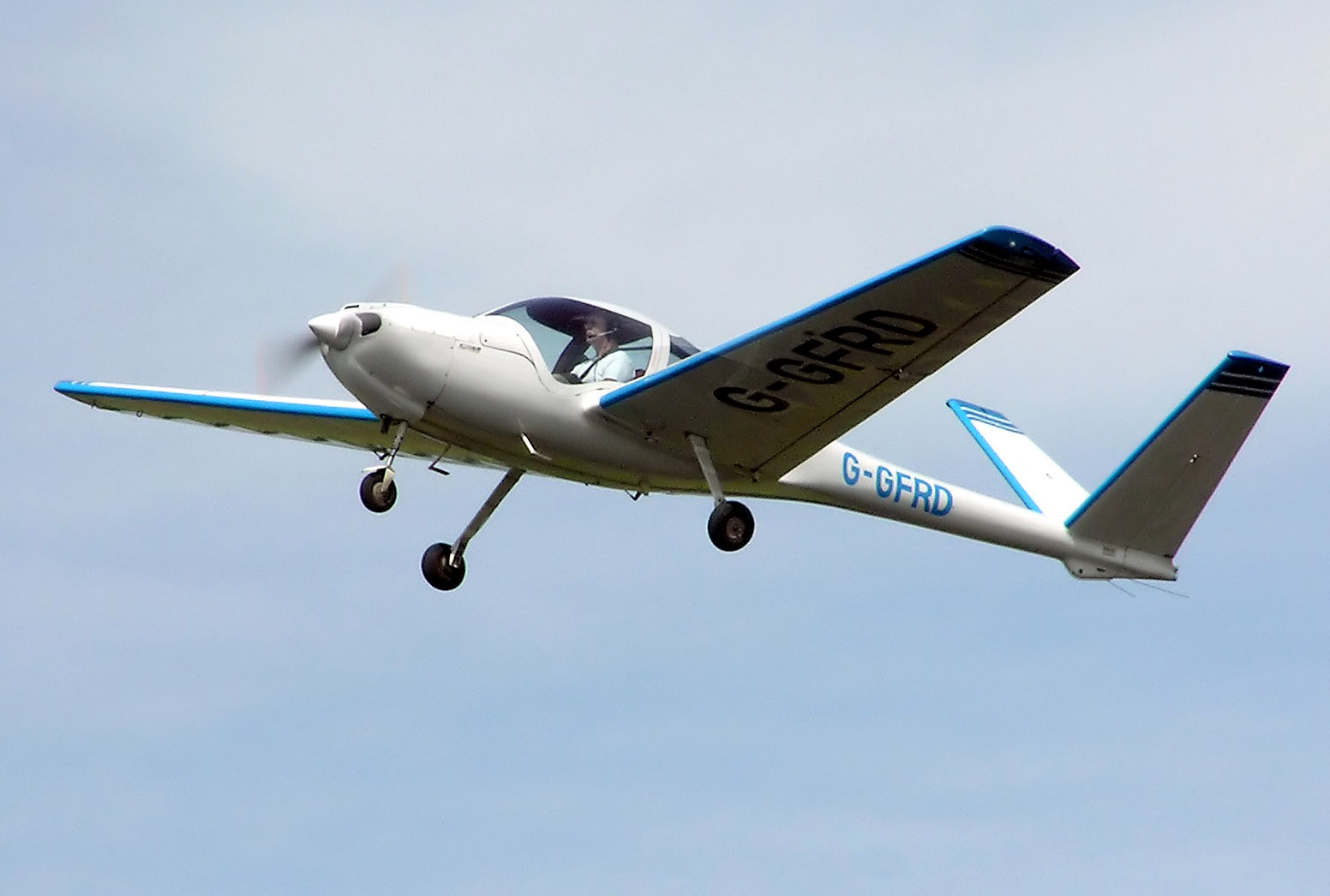

General information
- Type: Light aircraft
- Manufacturer: Avions Robin
- Number built: 132

History
- Manufactured: 1985–1991
- First flight: 17 June 1983

The Robin ATL (Avion Très Léger, "very light aircraft") is a French two-seat light aircraft designed by Avions Robin in the 1980s to meet a need for an economical two-seat aircraft to equip flying clubs. It is a single-engined monoplane with a fixed tricycle undercarriage, conventional control stick, and is, unusually, fitted with a V-tail. Due to the large bubble canopy, visibility is excellent. Its benign flight characteristics, moderate speeds and low fuel consumption, as well as some unique details, like an engine starter button which can only be pressed when the fuel selector switch is open, made the ATL a good trainer.

== Development and design ==
In the early 1980s, Avions Pierre Robin started design of an ultra-lightweight two-seat light aircraft intended to meet the requirements of French flying clubs for a low-cost light trainer, as existing American training aircraft were becoming increasingly expensive, which was not helped by an unfavourable exchange rate, which resulted in a competition to supply a new light trainer, which could be mass-produced for supply to subsidised French flying clubs. Robin won the competition in 1983 with their ATL design, a single-engined low-winged monoplane with a fixed undercarriage and a V-tail. The ATL's fuselage was of Glass-reinforced plastic construction, with a wooden wing, while the V-tail is a conventional all-metal construction.

The first prototype flew on 17 June 1983, powered by a single 35 kW (47 hp) JPX PAL 1300, a new design of two stroke, three-cylinder radial engine. However, testing showed that the new engine was prone to vibration, and in order to speed development and certification, the prototype was re-engined with a converted Volkswagen car engine, which formed the basis for production. As the four-cylinder car engine was heavier than the original engine, the aircraft's wings were swept forward to maintain the aircraft's centre of gravity in an acceptable position.

== Operational history ==
First orders, for 30 ATLs were placed by the French National Aviation Federation in November 1983, with initial deliveries starting (under a limited airworthiness approval) in April 1985. Full French certification followed on 15 January 1986. The ATL was prone to engine problems, however, which forced the recall of early production aircraft for modification, and limited the attractiveness of the aircraft, particularly for export.

One solution to this problem was re-engining with a more reliable engine, and Robin developed a version for the German market powered by a 52.5 kW (70 hp) Limbach. While the Limbach was also a modified VW car engine, crucially, it had dual ignition instead of the single ignition on the JPX-modified engines normally used, this being certified in 1989. This came too late, however, and production ended in 1991 after the completion of 132 aircraft, of which 10 were powered by the Limbach engine.

== Variants ==
ATL Club
Initial production version, named Bijou in the UK.
ATL Club Model 88
Late production version, with smaller propeller giving greater ground clearance and more fuel.
ATL Club Model 89
Limbach powered version.

== Specifications (ATL Club) ==
Data from Jane's All the World's Aircraft 1988–89.

General characteristics

- Crew: 2
- Length: 6.72 m (22 ft 1 in)
- Wingspan: 10.25 m (33 ft 8 in)
- Height: 2.00 m (6 ft 7 in)
- Wing area: 12.15 m^{2} (130.8 sq ft)
- Aspect ratio: 8.65:1
- Airfoil: NACA 43015 modified
- Empty weight: 360 kg (794 lb)
- Max takeoff weight: 580 kg (1,279 lb)
- Fuel capacity: 42 L (9.2 imp gal; 11 US gal) usable fuel
- Powerplant: 1 × JPX 4T 60A four-cylinder air-cooled horizontally opposed, 48 kW (65 hp)

Performance

- Maximum speed: 185 km/h (115 mph, 100 kn) at sea level
- Cruise speed: 142 km/h (88 mph, 77 kn) at 2,440 m (8,010 ft) (econ. cruise, 50% power)
- Stall speed: 75 km/h (47 mph, 40 kn) (flaps down)
- Range: 790 km (490 mi, 430 nmi)
- Service ceiling: 3,960 m (12,990 ft)
- Rate of climb: 2.8 m/s (550 ft/min)
- Takeoff distance to 15 m (50 ft): 420 m (1,380 ft)
- Landing distance from 15 m (50 ft): 380 ft (120 m)

== See also ==
Aircraft of comparable role, configuration, and era

- ARV Super2
