= Robin DR.200 =

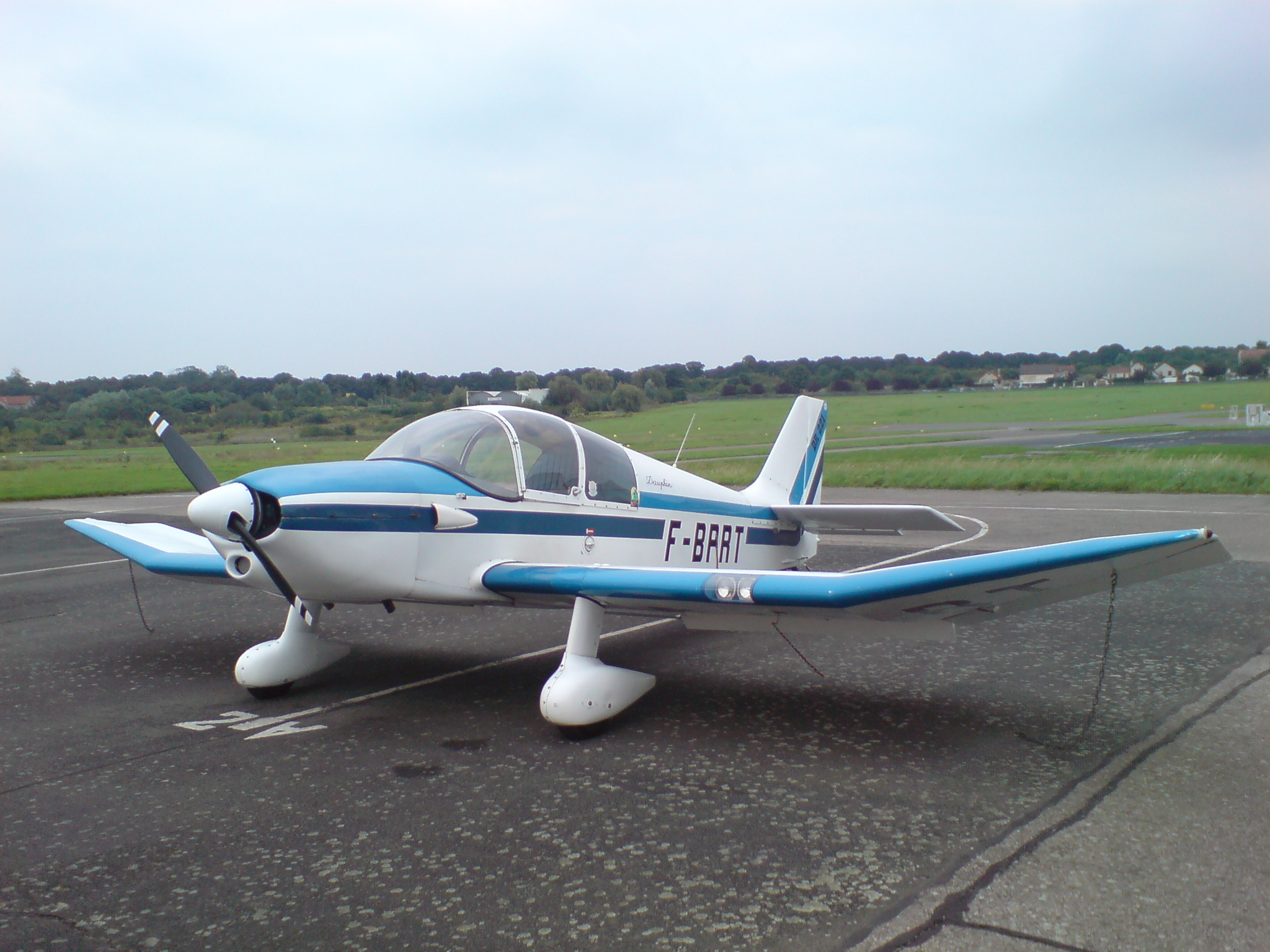
- DR.221 Dauphin

General information
- Type: Four-seat light aircraft
- Manufacturer: Avions Pierre Robin
- Number built: 348

History
- First flight: 1964 (DR.200)
- Variant: Robin DR300

The Robin DR.200 is a family of French conventional landing gear single-engined light touring or training cabin monoplanes. Originally produced by Centre Est Aéronautique the company later changed its name to Avions Pierre Robin.

== Development ==
Originally flown as the DR.200 which was a variant of the earlier DR.1050M1 with a strengthened wing and longer fuselage. The production version was the DR.250 Capitaine a four-seater with a 160 hp Lycoming O-320 engine and all-flying tailplane. The DR.250 first flew in 1965. The next development was a two-seat variant with a shorter fuselage the DR.220 2+2, it was powered by a 105 hp Continental O-200-A engine. The DR.221 Dauphin introduced a bigger 115 hp Lycoming O-235C engine. Then the DR.253 Regent was first flown in 1967, introducing a tricycle landing gear which was to become standard on all the following Robin designs.

== Variants ==
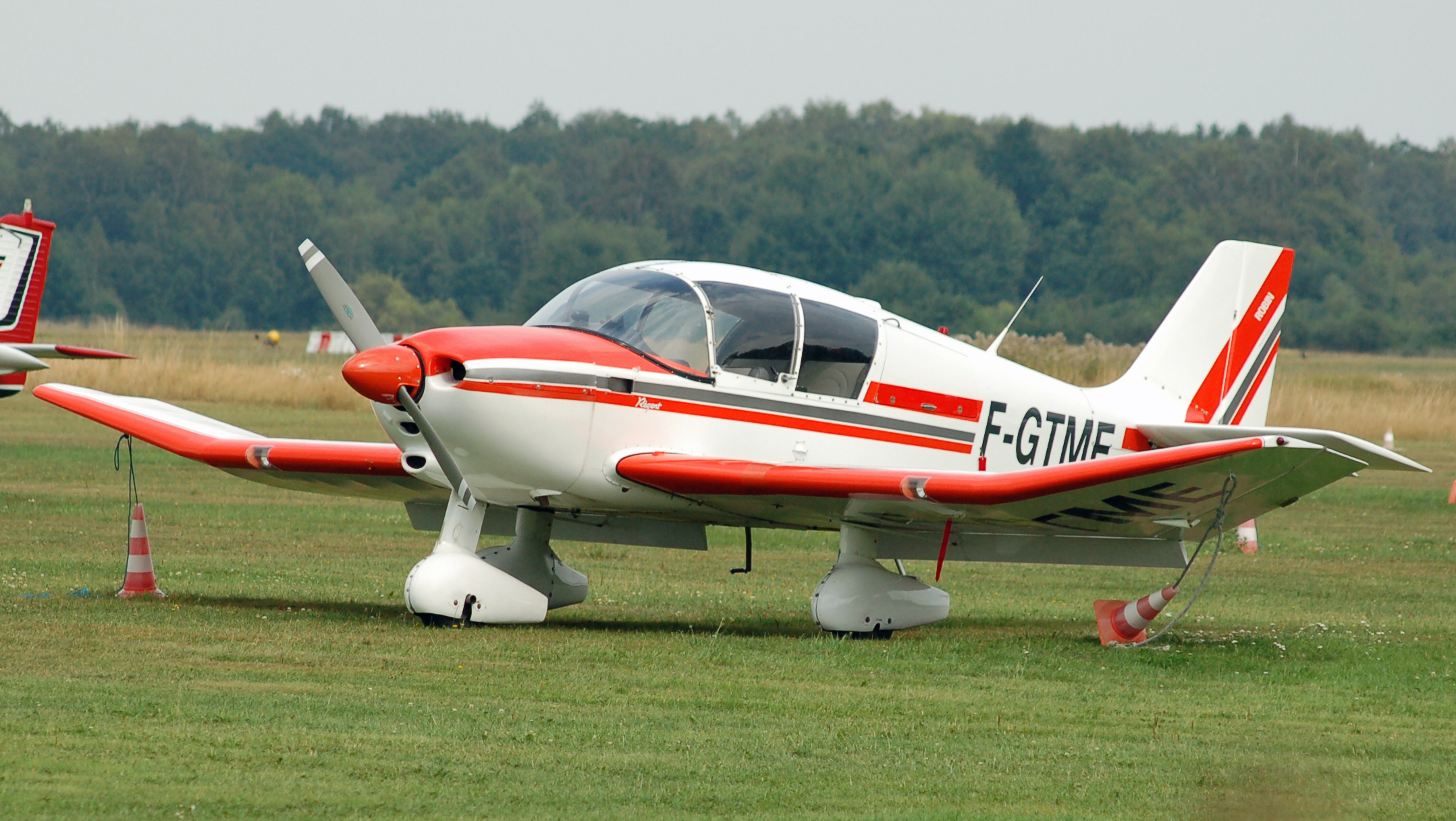
A DR 253 Régent with tricycle landing gear

DR.200
Prototype four-seat development of the DR.1050M1 with a Potez 105E engine, two built.
DR.220 2+2
Shorter fuselage two-seat variant although it did have a small rear seat, powered by a 105hp Continental O-200-A engine, 83 built.
DR.221 Dauphin
A DR.200 with four seats and powered by a 115hp Lycoming O-235C engine, 62 built.
DR.250 Capitaine
A DR.200 with all-flying tailplane and powered by a 160hp Lycoming O-320-E engine, 100 built.
DR.250-180
Experimental DR.250 with a 180hp Lycoming O-360-A engine, one built.
DR.253 Regent
A DR.250 with enlarged fuselage and tricycle landing gear, powered by a Lycoming O-360-D2A engine, 100 built.

== Specifications (DR.221) ==
Data from Jane's.

General characteristics

- Crew: 2
- Length: 7.00 m (23 ft 0 in)
- Wingspan: 8.72 m (28 ft 7 in)
- Height: 1.85 m (6 ft 1 in)
- Wing area: 13.60 m^{2} (146.4 sq ft)
- Empty weight: 475 kg (1,047 lb) equipped
- Max takeoff weight: 840 kg (1,852 lb)
- Powerplant: 1 × Lycoming O-235-C2A flat-four piston engine, 86 kW (115 hp)
- Propellers: 2-bladed EVRA, 1.80 m (5 ft 11 in) diameter wooden fixed pitch propeller

Performance

- Maximum speed: 235 km/h (146 mph, 127 kn) at sea level
- Cruise speed: 220 km/h (140 mph, 120 kn) at 2,750 m (9,000 ft) (75% power)
- Stall speed: 80 km/h (50 mph, 43 kn)
- Never exceed speed: 290 km/h (180 mph, 160 kn)
- Range: 910 km (570 mi, 490 nmi)
- Service ceiling: 3,900 m (12,800 ft)
- Rate of climb: 3.3 m/s (650 ft/min)

== See also ==
Related development

- Robin DR300
- Robin DR400
