= Robin DR400 =

Monoplane

DR400
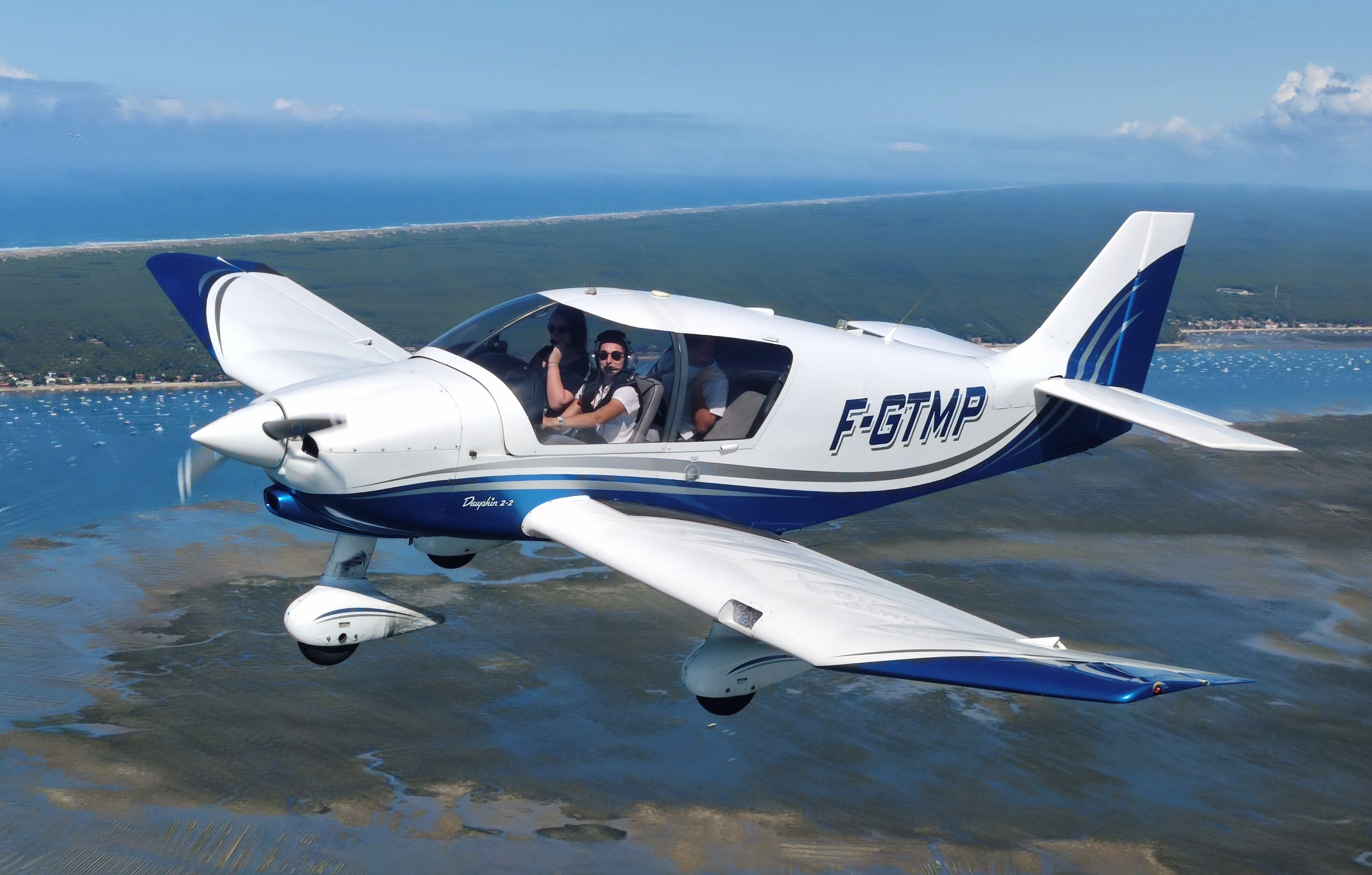
- DR400/100

General information
- Type: Four-seat light aircraft
- Manufacturer: Avions Pierre Robin
- Designer: Jean Délémontez and Pierre Robin
- Number built: 2,700+

History
- First flight: 1972
- Developed from: Robin DR.200
- Variant: Robin DR500

The Robin DR400 is a single-engine wooden monoplane produced by Robin Aircraft (formerly "Avions Pierre Robin"). The Robin DR400 is widely used in flight schools and for private use in France.

== Description ==
The Robin DR400 was released in 1972, as a development of the DR300 series. Compared to the latter, the two major differences of the DR400 are a wider cabin at shoulder level and a forward-sliding canopy, a new concept introduced with the Robin HR-1 in 1969, made to replace the doors present on earlier series. The wings have a 'cranked-wing' configuration, allowing for stable cruising and safer stalls. The dashboard is also clearer and more elevated than on previous models, allowing easier instrument readings.

The main difference between DR400 models is the engine, as the cabin remains identical between versions. The low-powered models, which go up to 120hp, are called "2+2" to indicate they can carry 2 adults and 2 children (or three adults). The other models are all four-seaters, as the 180hp engine can carry 4 passengers, a full fuel tank, and luggage.

The design of the aircraft is old; it consists of a wooden canvas structure with a low, positive-dihedral wing. It is the same wood and fabric type as Jodel wings. The landing gear is in the non-retractable, tricycle configuration, allowing easier taxiing, takeoff and landing than conventional landing gears.

The DR400 is very present in France, operating as a training aircraft in flight schools and a rental aircraft for flight clubs. In 2019, French air clubs operated 864 DR300 and DR400 models out of the 2394 training and rental aircraft available nationwide.

Production of the DR400 ceased in 2014, as it was replaced with the Robin DR401.

== History and Development ==
The first prototype of the DR400, a 180hp "Régent", flew for the first time in Darois in early 1972. The production of the DR400 began on 10 May of the same year.

The 6 initial versions were:

- The DR400-180 "Régent", which first flew on 27 March 1972 with the registration F-WSQO
- The DR400-125 "Petit Prince", which first flew on 15 May 1972 with the registration F-WSQT
- The DR400-160 "Chevalier", which first flew on 29 June 1972
- The DR400-180R "Remorqueur", which first flew on 6 November 1972
- The DR400-140 "Major", which first flew on 16 November 1972
- The DR400-108 "Dauphin 2+2", which first flew on 24 November 1972

The naming system of the DR400 models is similar to that of the DR300 series, with the engine's horsepower indicated in the version names.

The top of the canopy is usually painted on these aircraft except for the 180R (which is clear to improve visibility when towing) and the Petit Prince, whose plexiglass canopy is tinted on the top.

In 1974, the 180R is equipped with an additional rear window, and in 1987, all DR400 versions are equipped with this feature. Although this may improve the aircraft's appearance, the additional mass greatly hinders the aircraft's flight capabilities. The addition of reinforcements and a firewall add 25kg to the aircraft's mass. Due to this addition, these modifications are later removed from the less powerful versions, in 1993.

In 1975, the DR400-108 is renamed DR400-100 and the "Petit Prince" is renamed DR400-120. Later on, it is equipped with a new propeller and renamed "Dauphin" while the production of the DR400-100 is ceased in 1979.

In 1980, the DR400 B Major is retired and replaced with the DR400 Major 80 (Still with 160hp). The new Major 80 has an extended range of 1375 km, making it a very attractive aircraft for travel.

Due to its attractive price and good performance characteristics, the "Dauphin 2+2" is the most sold version of the DR400 family and remains so in the 21st century.

The successor of the DR400 is the DR401, with more modern technology and increased comfort.

== Variants ==
DR315 Petit Prince
A development of the earlier DR221 with a tricycle landing gear and powered by a 115hp Lycoming O-235-C2A engine.
DR330
An experimental DR.315 fitted with a 130hp Continental O-240-A engine in 1970.
DR340 Major
A development of the earlier DR250 with a tricycle landing gear and powered by a 140hp Lycoming O-320-E2A engine.
DR360 Chevalier
DR340 with a solid cabin roof and a 160hp Lycoming O-320-D2A engine.
DR300/108 2+2
Replacement for the DR.315 with improved landing gear and either two or four seats.
DR300/120
Four-seat DR.300 with a 120hp Lycoming O-235-L2A engine.
DR300/140
DR300 with a 140hp Lycoming O-320-E2A engine.
DR300/180

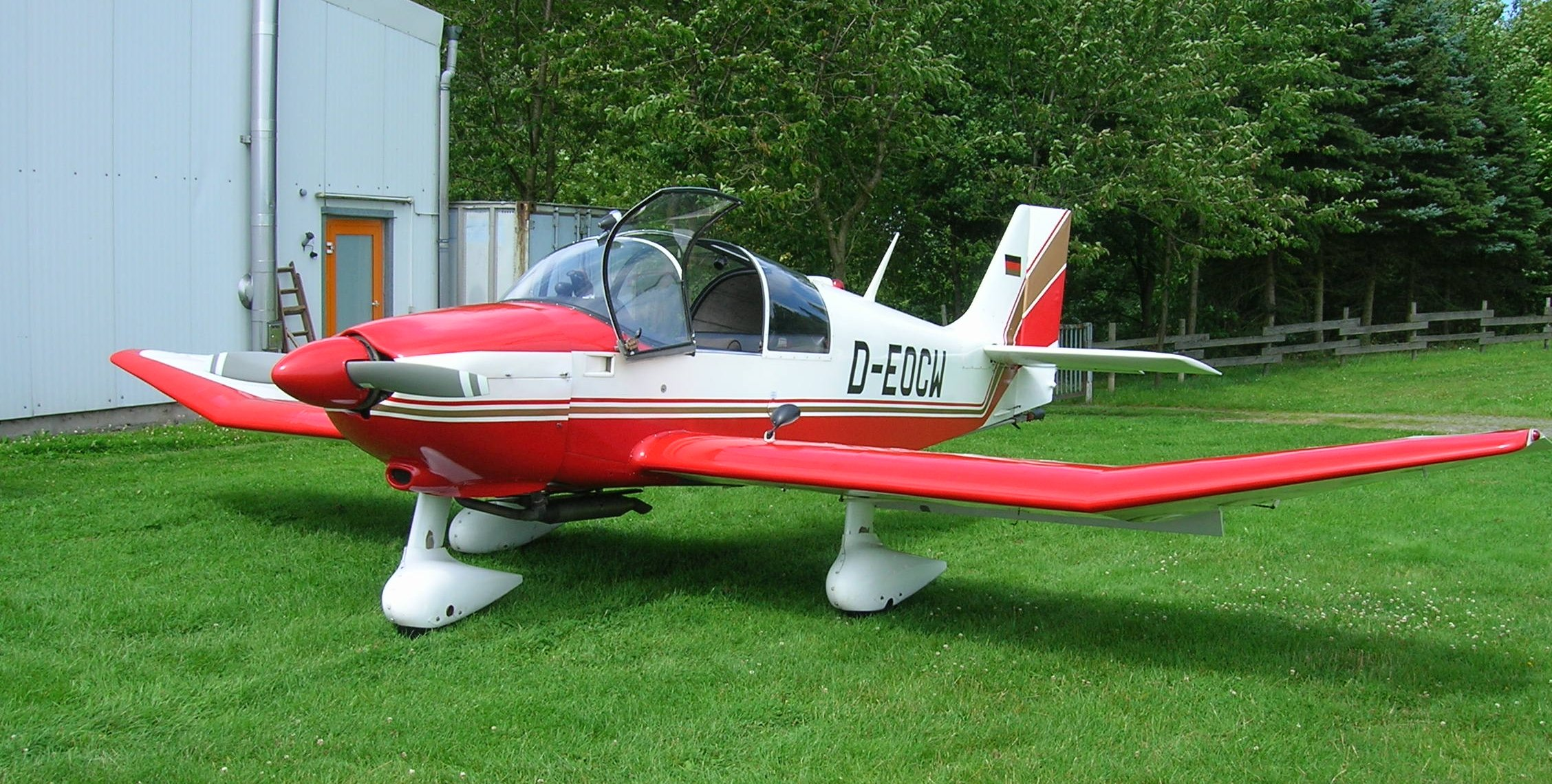
DR300-180R

DR300 with a 180hp Lycoming O-360-A3A engine.

DR300/180R
Glider tug version of the DR.300-180.
DR400/100 Cadet
Two-seat version of the DR.400-108
DR400/108 Dauphin 80 2+2
DR300/108 with forward-sliding canopy
DR400/120 Petit Prince
DR300/120 with forward-sliding canopy
DR400/120 Dauphin 2+2
Petit Prince with extra cabin windows.
DR400/125
DR400/120 with a 125hp Lycoming O-235-F engine
DR400/140 Earl
DR300/140 with forward-sliding canopy
DR400/140B Major 80
DR400/140 with a 160hp Lycoming O-320-D2A
DR400/160 Chevalier
Original designation for the DR400-140B
DR400/180 Regent
DR300/180 with forward-sliding canopy, later models have extra cabin windows.
DR.400/180 Regent III
A Nouvelle Generation DR400
DR400/180R Remorqueur
DR400/180 glider tug with clear canopy
DR400/180RP Remo 212
DR400/180R fitted with a 212hp Porsche PFM 3200 engine and 3-bladed propeller
DR401

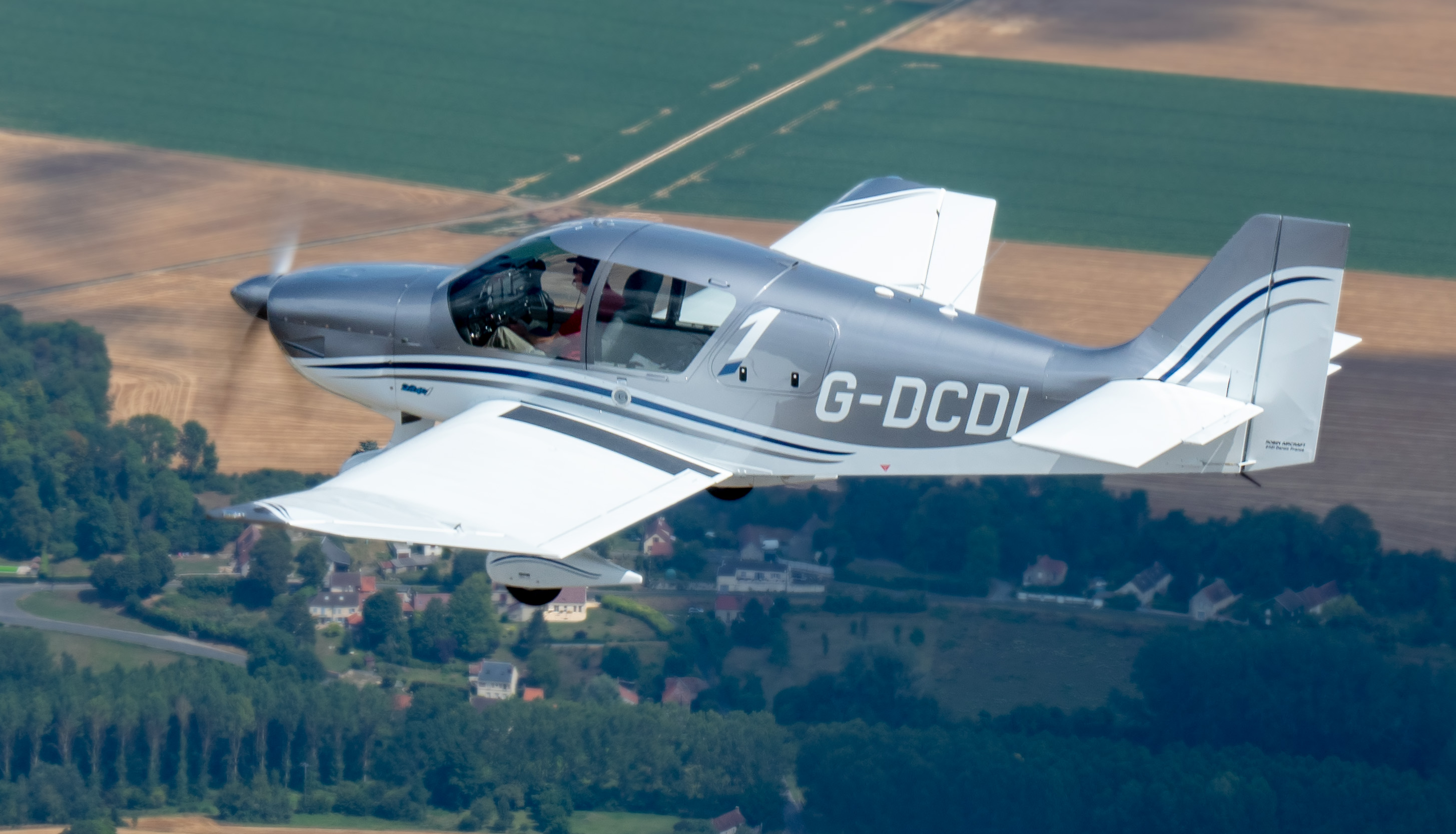
A DR401-155CDI in flight

Supplied by the resurrected Robin Aircraft. Glass cockpit, larger cockpit, electric trim and flaps, range of engine options, variants for "long range" and "aerotow".

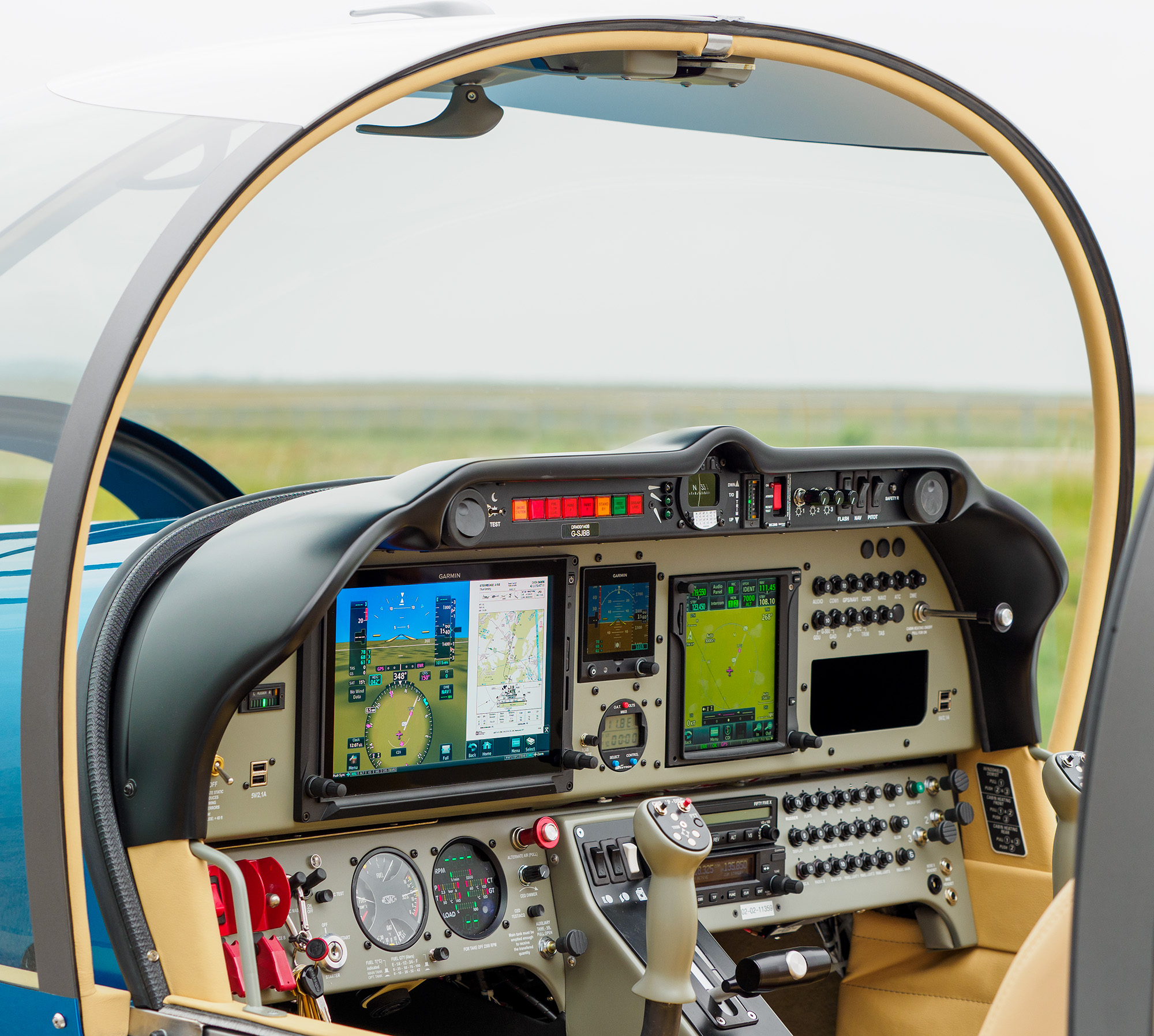
Cockpit of a DR-401-155CDI equipped with full glass cockpit and IFR certified.

== Specifications ==
3-view line drawing of the Robin DR 400

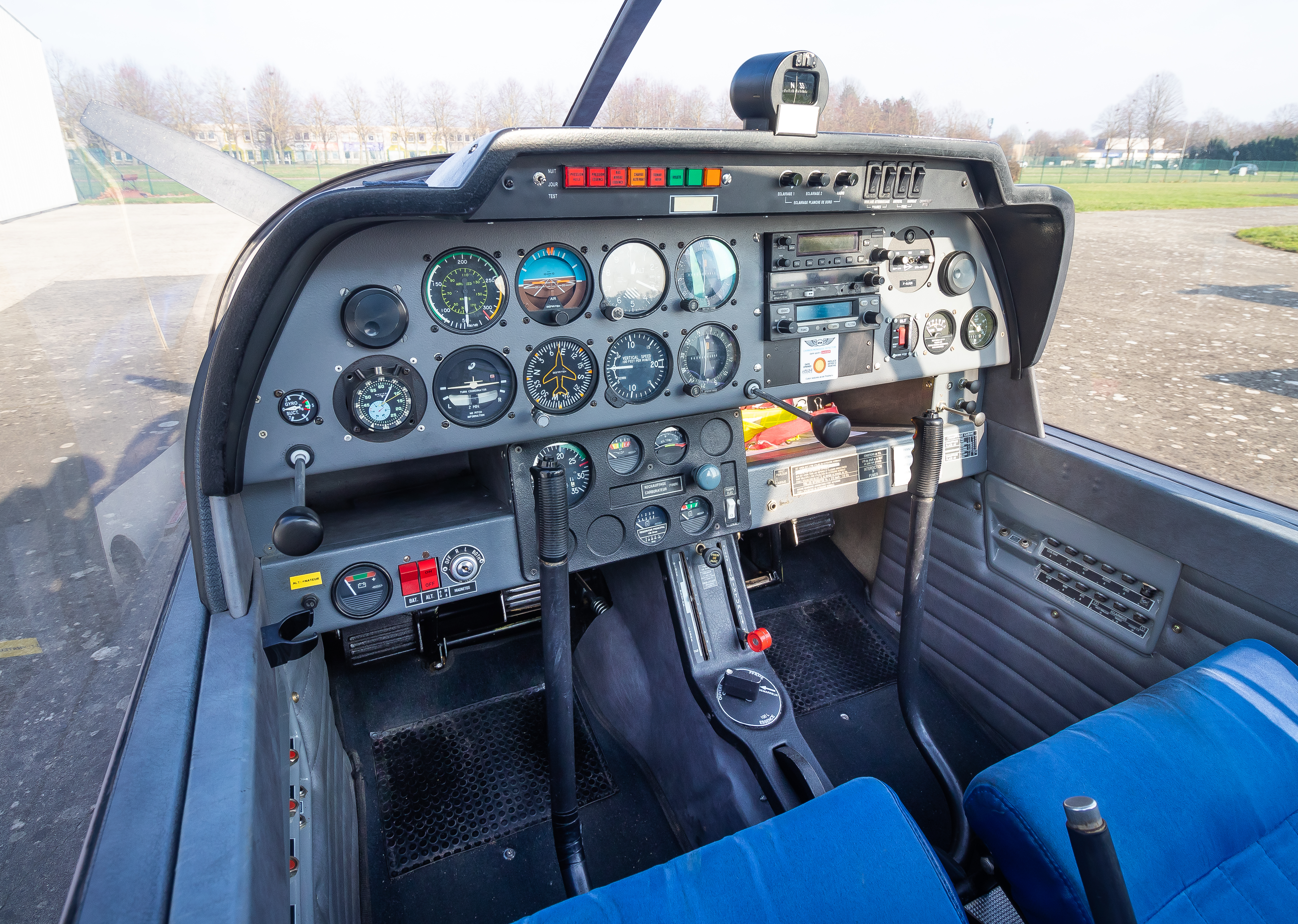
Cockpit of a DR400-120

Over the years, the dashboards of the DR400 have evolved. A noticeable difference is that some aircraft are not equipped with pedal-brakes but rather with a brake handle located between the two front seats. Some other differences can be noticed such as the presence (or lack of) warning panels.

The DR400 is also available with a glass cockpit.

	Dauphin 2+2	Dauphin 4	Major	Régent	Remo 180	Remo 200
Engine	Lycoming O-235	Lycoming O-320	Lycoming O-320	Lycoming O-360	Lycoming O-360	Lycoming IO-360
Horsepower	118	160	160	180	180	200
Propeller	Two bladed, fixed pitch	Two bladed, fixed pitch	Two bladed, fixed pitch	Two bladed, fixed pitch	Two bladed, fixed pitch	Two bladed, variable pitch
Capacity	2+2	4	4	4	4	4
Wingspan (m)	8.72	8.72	8.72	8.72	8.72	8.72
Length (m)	6.96	6.96	6.96	6.96	6.96	7.22
Height (m)	2.23	2.23	2.23	2.23	2.23	2.23
Wing Surface (m)	13.60	13.60	14.20	14.20	13.60	13.60
Empty Weight (kg)	550	580	598	610	592	650
Max. Weight (kg)	900	1,000	1,050	1,100	1,000	1,100
Useful Load (kg)	350	420	452	490	408	450
Max. Speed (km/h)	241	265	271	278	270	270
Cruising Speed (km/h)	215	215	245	260	230	250
Stall Speed (km/h)	82	99	93	95	87	91
Range (km)	928	860	1,530	1,278		

Source.
