= Alpha 2000 =

General aviation aircraft by Alpha Aviation

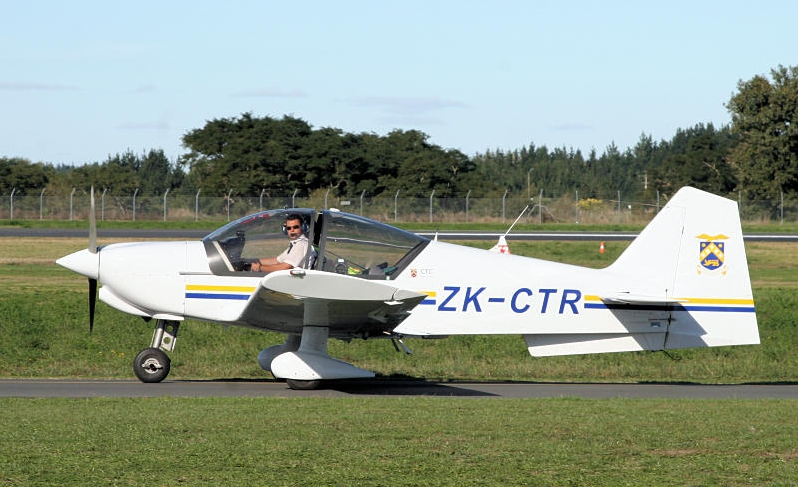
- R2160 Alpha Sport

General information
- Type: Multipurpose civil aircraft
- Manufacturer: Alpha Aviation
- Designer: Chris Heintz

History
- First flight: 15 January 1976

The Alpha Aviation Alpha 2000 is a two-seat, all-metal training and general aviation aircraft, designed by Chris Heintz and built in Hamilton, New Zealand. It continues the successful French Apex Aircraft's Robin R2000 series acquired upon Apex's purchase of the Avions Robin company.

== History 1971–1994 ==
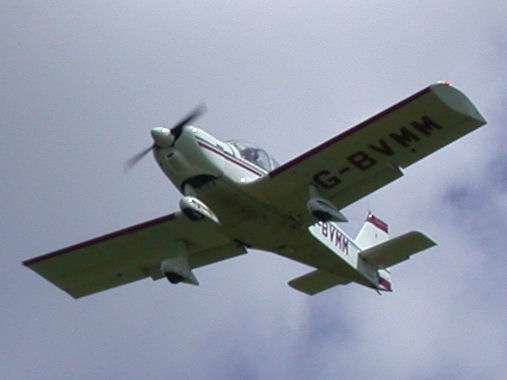
Robin HR200/100 G-BVMM

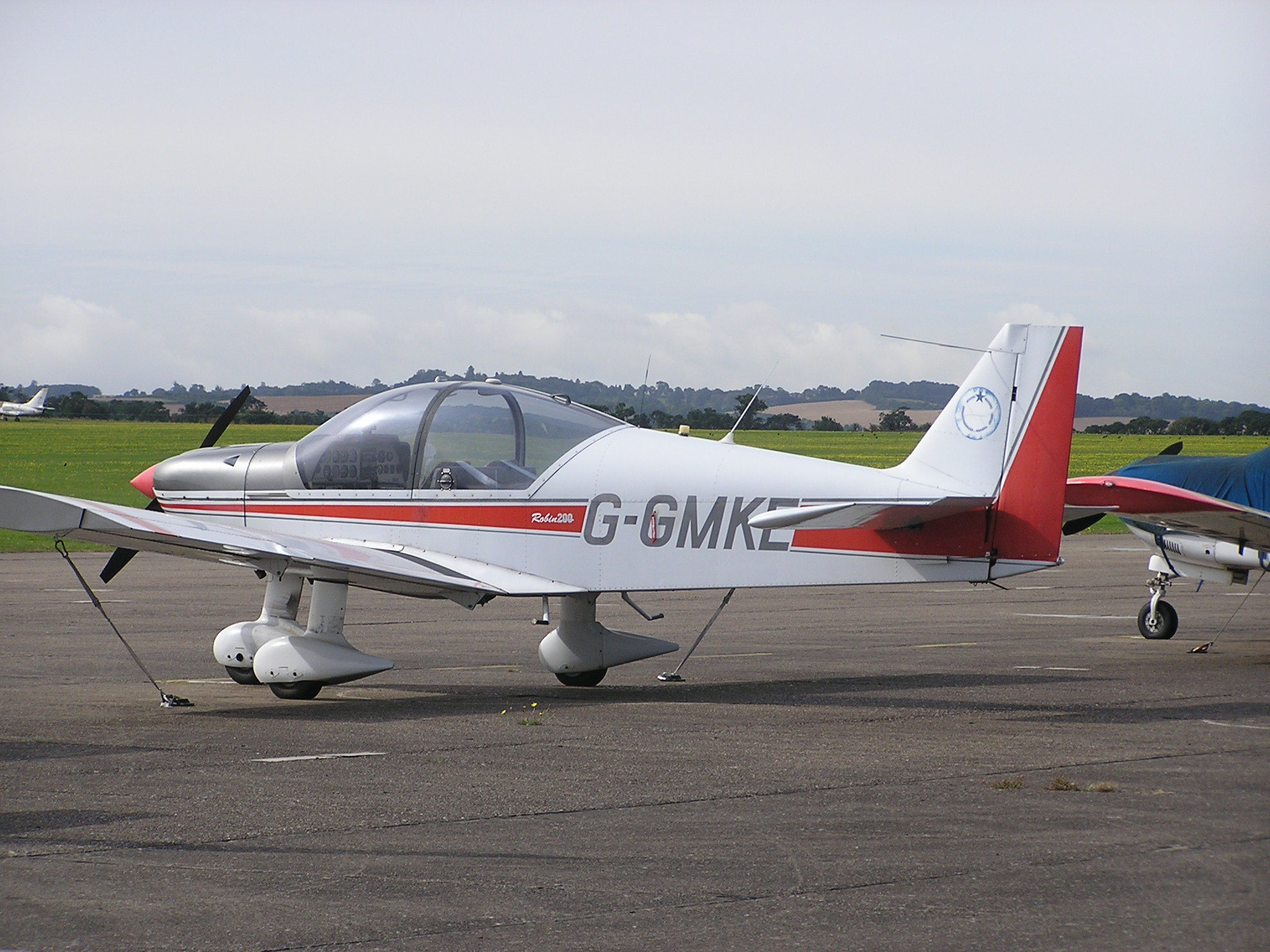
Robin HR200/120B

The original Avions Robin HR200 was designed by Christophe Heintz, to supplement the earlier Avions Robin designs of Jean Délémontez who also designed the popular post war wooden Jodel. The HR 200 prototype first flew on 19 July 1971, and entered production in 1973. The R2000 Alpha name was applied to a new aircraft which shared the fuselage of the HR 200, but had all new wing and tail surfaces, to allow aerobatics. The prototype R2000 Alpha flew on 15 January 1976 and production followed in 1977 to 1983. The aircraft features side-by-side seating, an innovative control stick mechanism which reduces the risk of blockage and an unusually large payload for an aerobatic aircraft, making it useful for overland trips as well.

Licensed production was also undertaken in Canada.

== History 1994–2004 ==
The R2160 model was returned to production with minor modifications in 1994 by Apex Aircraft. It was stressed to +6/−3 g and has a MTOW of 900 kg. There was also a fuel injected model (R2160i) and a non-aerobatic 120 hp trainer.

== New Zealand production 2004–2008 ==
In 2004 Alpha Aviation of New Zealand bought engineering jigs and equipment and worldwide production rights to both the Robin HR200 and Robin R2000 series. Alpha Aviation has recommenced production of the Robin R2120 as the Alpha 2000 120T and of the Robin R2160 as the Alpha 2000 160A and 160Ai. Apex continues to market the aircraft in Europe.

Production of the New Zealand development began in 2006 against orders for nine aircraft and eighteen options (including orders from the UK, South Africa and Australia), with capacity to build four aircraft a month. An Alpha 160A, ZK-FXY, was first off the production line, being test flown on 12 April 2006. It was subsequently used as a company demonstrator. It made its first public appearance at the 2006 Warbirds over Wanaka airshow. In January 2008 production was halted due to the liquidation of Alpha Aviation by parent company Inventis. Alpha Aviation Holdings Limited in New Zealand continues to hold the type certificate. The STC for spare parts supply was re-acquired by CEAPR in France in 2017.

== Variants ==
=== Robin/Apex ===
R 2100A
Powered by 81 kW (108 hp) Lycoming O-235 engine. 34 built
R 2112 Alpha
Replacement for R 2100 with 83.5 kW (112 hp) Lycoming O-235 engine.
R 2160 Alpha Sport
119 kW (160 hp) Lycoming O-320 engine. Originally named Acrobin. R 2160 D: technically identical version with slightly reduced max. allowed RPM to meet German noise limitations.

=== Alpha Aviation ===
As of 2006 three variants are offered. The approximate horsepower of each is indicated by the type number.

Alpha 120T
the smallest and cheapest, envisaged as a trainer.
Alpha 160A
a more powerful fully aerobatic trainer.
Alpha 160Ai
a fuel injected engine and equipped for cross country touring as well as aerobatics.

== Specifications (R2160 Alpha Sport) ==
Data from Jane's All The World's Aircraft 1982–83

General characteristics

- Crew: 2
- Length: 7.10 m (23 ft 3.5 in)
- Wingspan: 8.33 m (27 ft 4 in)
- Height: 2.135 m (7 ft 0 in)
- Wing area: 13.00 m^{2} (140 sq ft)
- Aspect ratio: 5.34
- Airfoil: NACA 23015
- Empty weight: 575 kg (1,268 lb)
- Max takeoff weight: 1,000 kg (2,205 lb)
- Powerplant: 1 × Avco Lycoming O-320-D2A air-cooled flat-four piston engine, 119 kW (160 hp)

Performance

- Maximum speed: 257 km/h (160 mph, 138 kn) at sea level
- Cruise speed: 234 km/h (145 mph, 126 kn) at 3,350 m (11,000 ft)(65% power)
- Stall speed: 85 km/h (53 mph, 46 kn) (flaps down)
- Never exceed speed: 333 km/h (207 mph, 180 kn)
- Range: 796 km (495 mi, 430 nmi) (max fuel, 65% power)
- Service ceiling: 3,800 m (12,500 ft)
- Rate of climb: 5.2 m/s (1,025 ft/min)

== See also ==
Aircraft of comparable role, configuration, and era

- Liberty XL2
- AMD Alarus
- Grumman American AA-1
- Piper Tomahawk
- Cessna 152

Related lists

- List of civil aircraft
