= Beardmore Inflexible =

Inflexible
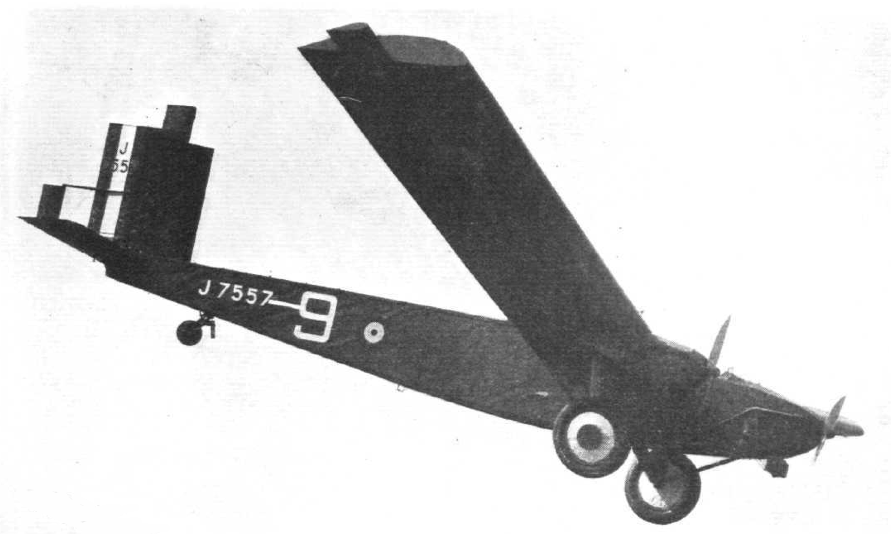

General information
- Type: Experimental Transport
- Manufacturer: Beardmore
- Designer: Dr Rohrbach/W.S Shackleton
- Status: Retired
- Primary user: Royal Air Force
- Number built: 1

History
- Introduction date: 1928
- First flight: 5 March 1928
- Retired: 1930

The Beardmore Inflexible, also known as the Rohrbach Ro VI, was a three-engined all-metal prototype transport aircraft built by William Beardmore and Company at Dalmuir, Scotland.

== Design and development ==
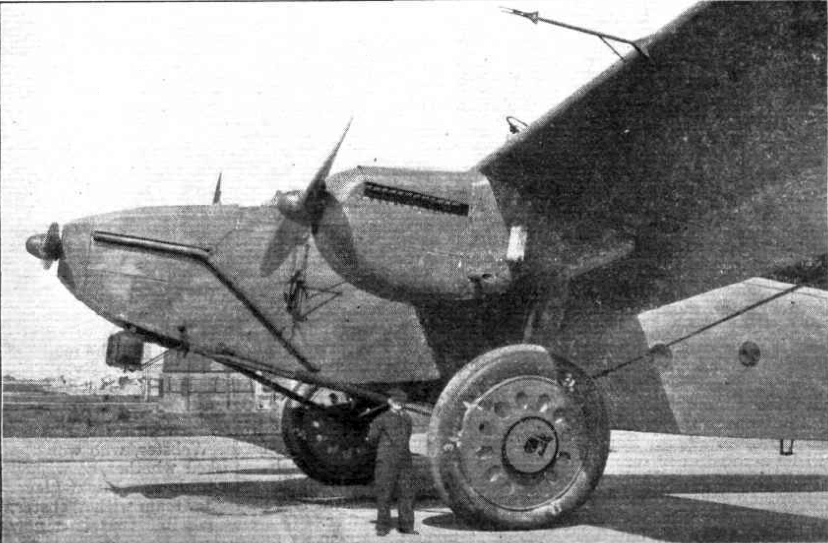
Beardmore Inflexible photo published in Flight magazine, April 1928

William Beardmore and Company had acquired a licence for the use of the Rohrbach principle for stressed-skin construction. Using these principles and drawings supplied by Rohrbach for the RoVI, the Beardmore company built a massive all-metal three-engined transport, the Beardmore Inflexible.

The aircraft was built in sections at Dalmuir between 1925 and 1927 which were shipped by sea to Felixstowe and from there delivered by road to the Aeroplane & Armament Experimental Establishment (A&AEE) at Martlesham Heath Airfield where it first flew on 5 March 1928. It appeared at the Hendon RAF Display later in the year. The aircraft was structurally advanced for its time and had good flying qualities. It was also a very large aircraft for the time, having a wingspan of 157 ft (48 m) - around 16 ft (4.9 m) greater than the Boeing B-29 Superfortress heavy bomber of World War II. However, with an all up weight of 37,000 lb (17,000 kg) it was underpowered and, with no interest forthcoming from the RAF for a production contract, the aircraft was dismantled at Martlesham Heath in 1930. It was then examined for the effects of corrosion on light-alloy stressed skin structures.

The aircraft's main wheels both survive. One is on exhibit in the Science Museum, London. The other is at the Midland Air Museum.

== Operators ==
United Kingdom

- Royal Air Force

== Specifications ==
Data from Air Enthusiast International

General characteristics

- Length: 75 ft 6 in (23.01 m)
- Wingspan: 157 ft 6 in (48.01 m)
- Height: 21 ft 2 in (6.45 m)
- Wing area: 1,967 sq ft (182.7 m^{2})
- Empty weight: 24,301 lb (11,023 kg)
- Max takeoff weight: 37,000 lb (16,783 kg)
- Powerplant: 3 × Rolls-Royce Condor II V12 piston engine, 650 hp (480 kW) each

Performance

- Maximum speed: 109 mph (175 km/h, 95 kn)
- Service ceiling: 9,350 ft (2,850 m)
- Rate of climb: 436 ft/min (2.21 m/s) at 2,000 ft (610 m)

== See also ==
Related development

- Rohrbach Ro IV

Aircraft of comparable role, configuration, and era

- Rohrbach Ro VII Robbe
- Rohrbach Roland
- Rohrbach Ro IX Rofix
- Rohrbach Romar
- Rohrbach Ro XI Rostra

Related lists

- List of aircraft of the Royal Air Force
