= Rohrbach Ro IV =

Ro IV
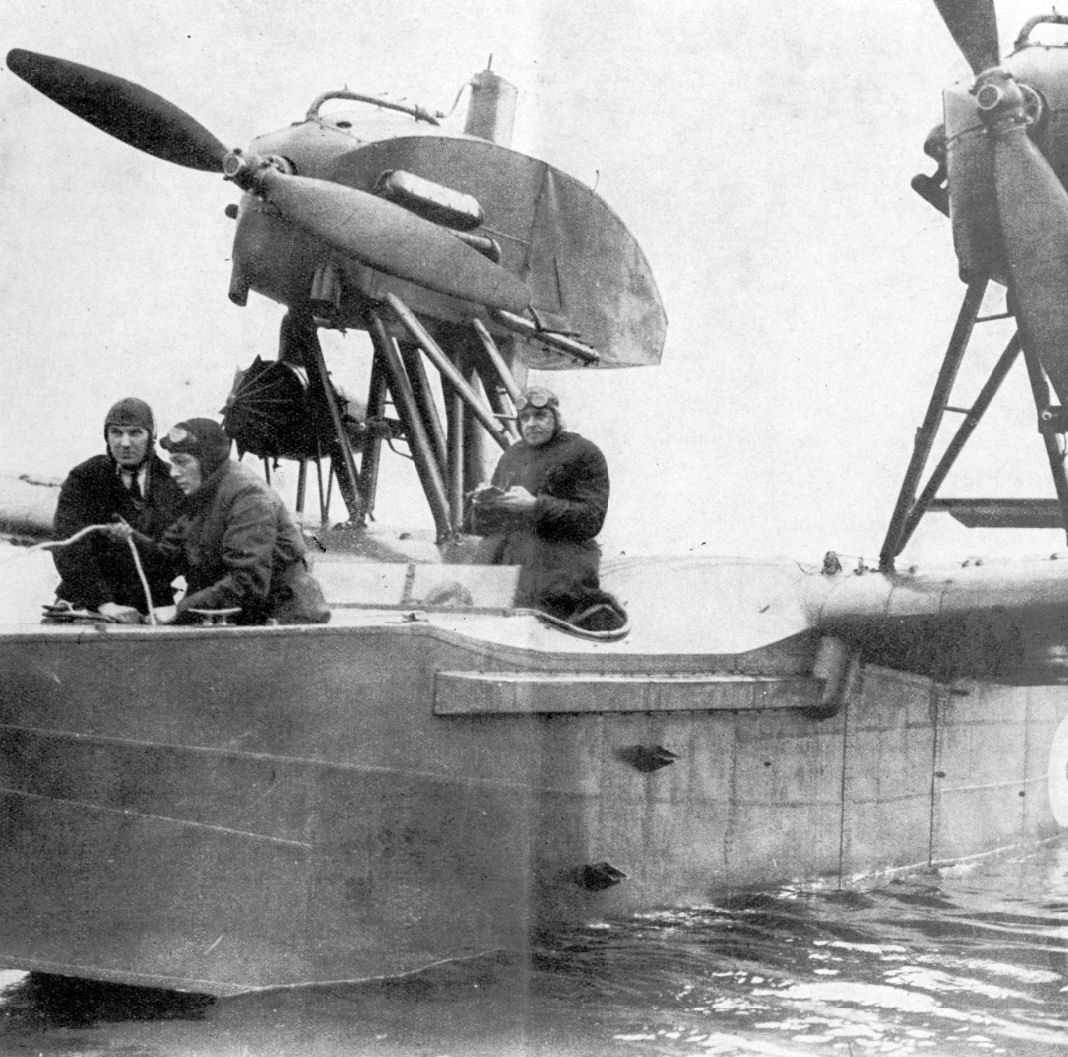
- Beardmore Inverness

General information
- Type: Flying boat
- National origin: Germany
- Manufacturer: Rohrbach/William Beardmore and Company
- Status: Prototype
- Primary user: Marine Aircraft Experimental Establishment
- Number built: 2

History
- First flight: 1925
- Developed from: Rohrbach Ro III

The Rohrbach Ro IV, also known as the Beardmore BeRo.2 Inverness was an all-metal monoplane flying boat of the 1920s. Designed by the German company Rohrbach for the British Royal Air Force, two were ordered, one completed by Rohrbach's Danish subsidiary and the second by the British licensees, William Beardmore and Company, but the type performed poorly during testing and was abandoned.

== Design and development ==
Dr.-Ing. Adolf Rohrbach, formerly of Zeppelin-Staaken, set up Rohrbach Metall-Flugzeugbau in 1922 to design and build large all-metal aircraft, with stressed skin structures, unusual for the time. In order to evade the restrictions of the Treaty of Versailles, Rohrbach set up a Danish subsidiary, Rohrbach Metal-Aeroplan Co A/S to assemble aircraft.

The Scottish shipbuilding company William Beardmore and Company of Dalmuir agreed a license manufacturing deal with Rohrbach in 1924. The British Air Ministry was interested in the use of metal hulls for flying boats, and therefore drew up Specification 20/24 for an all-metal monoplane flying boat to compare with the wooden biplanes in service with the Royal Air Force. In November 1924 Beardmore received an order for two Rorhbach flying boats, based on Rohrbach's Ro III but powered by British Napier Lion engines.

The Ro IV, known as the BeRo.2 Inverness by Beardmore, was a twin-engined high-winged cantilever monoplane, constructed mainly of duralumin. Its two engines were mounted in streamlined tractor nacelles above the wing centre section; the slab-sided fuselage accommodated the crew of four.

In order to speed delivery, the first aircraft serial number N183 was assembled in Rohrbach's Copenhagen factory from parts made in Rohrbach's main works in Berlin. It was delivered to the Marine Aircraft Experimental Establishment at Felixstowe on 18 September 1925, but testing showed the aircraft had poor handling both in the air and on the water, and poor performance, and it was destroyed during strength testing in May 1927.

The second prototype, assembled by Beardmore from Berlin-built parts, did not fly until 30 November 1928. While it incorporated a revised fuel and cooling system and a modified rudder, N184 still demonstrated poor performance. The programme was stopped in April 1929, and the prototype scrapped.

== Specifications (N.184) ==
Data from British Flying Boats

General characteristics

- Length: 56 ft 11 in (17.35 m)
- Wingspan: 94 ft 0 in (28.65 m)
- Height: 16 ft 3 in (4.95 m)
- Wing area: 760.7 sq ft (70.67 m^{2})
- Empty weight: 10,580 lb (4,799 kg)
- Max takeoff weight: 13,160 lb (5,969 kg)
- Powerplant: 2 × Napier Lion V W12 engine, 450 hp (340 kW) each

Performance

- Maximum speed: 110 mph (180 km/h, 96 kn)
- Endurance: 4 hr 30 min (estimated)
- Service ceiling: 8,750 ft (2,670 m)
- Rate of climb: 550 ft/min (2.8 m/s)

== See also ==
- Beardmore Inflexible

Related lists

- List of flying boats and floatplanes
