= Zeppelin-Staaken E-4/20 =

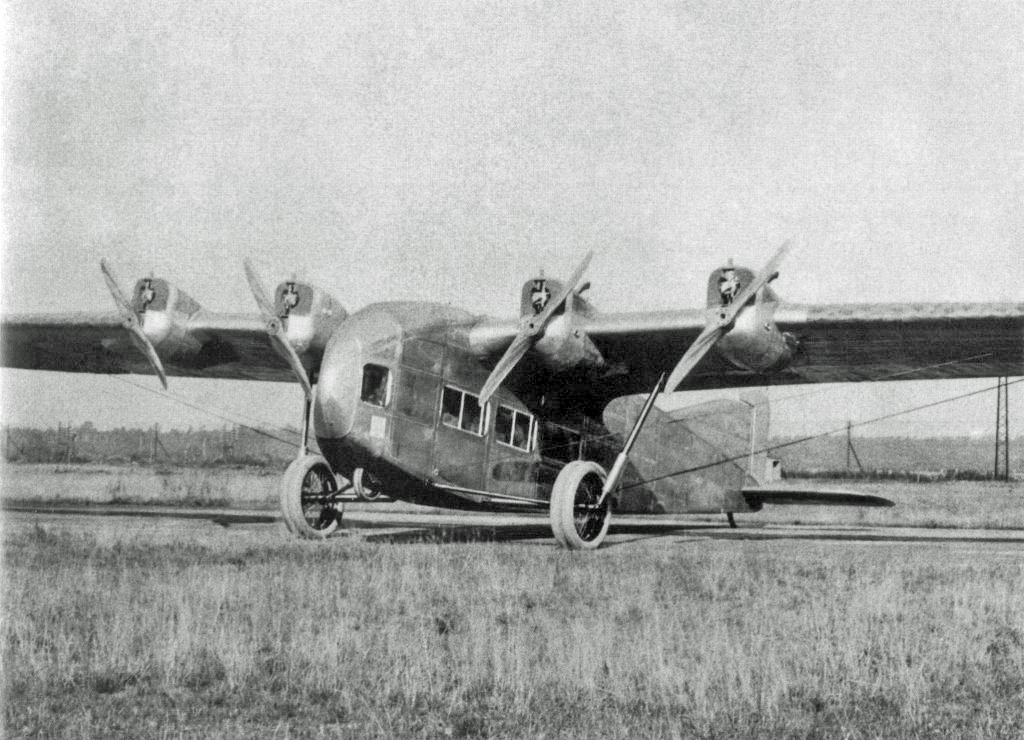

General information
- Type: Airliner
- National origin: Germany
- Manufacturer: Zeppelin-Staaken (Zeppelin-Werke G.m.b.H., Staaken, Berlin)
- Designer: Adolf Rohrbach
- Number built: 1

History
- First flight: 30 September 1920

The Zeppelin-Staaken E-4/20 was a revolutionary four-engine all-metal passenger monoplane designed in 1917 by Adolf Rohrbach and completed in 1919 at the Zeppelin-Staaken works outside Berlin, Germany. The E-4/20 was the first four-engine, all-metal stressed skin heavier-than-air airliner built.

== Design and development ==
At a time when most aircraft were small, single-engine biplanes made of wood and canvas, the E-4 was a large (102-foot wingspan), all-metal, four-engine, stress-skinned, semi-monocoque, cantilevered-wing monoplane, with an enclosed cockpit, and accommodation for 18 passengers plus a crew of five, including two pilots, a radio operator, an engineer and a steward, as well as radio-telegraph communications, a toilet, a galley and separate baggage and mail storage. With a maximum speed of 143 mph, cruising speed of 211 km/h (131 mph), a range of about 1,210 km (750 mi), and a fully loaded weight of 8,500 kg (18,739 lb), it outperformed most other airliners of its day.

The E-4 included numerous innovations, including its all-metal monocoque construction, onboard facilities such as lavatory, kitchen and radio communications, and its notable and sturdy monoplane load-bearing box-girder wing constructed of dural metal which formed both the wing's main girder and the structure of the wing itself. Skinned with thin sheets of dural metal to give the aerofoil shape necessary for a wing, the girder section wing had fabric covered leading and trailing edges attached to it. This superb and innovative wing was robust and self-supporting.

The E-4 was completed in 1919 and test flown between 30 September 1920 and 1922 when it was broken up on the orders of the Inter-Allied Commission.

== Background ==
The Zeppelin-Staaken E-4/20 was a product of the innovative Zeppelin Airship company. Count Ferdinand von Zeppelin, founder of the Luftschiffbau Zeppelin GmbH (Zeppelin Airship Construction Co.) was himself an aeronautical innovator, creator of the groundbreaking giant aluminium alloy framed Zeppelin lighter than air dirigible airships and later developer of a series of Riesenflugzeuge (R-Planes).

Zeppelin was one of the first aeronautical pioneers to apply stringent scientific principles to the design of aircraft, focusing on issues like power-to-weight ratios of engines and using the new metal alloy aluminium for structural components. Zeppelin heard of the success in Russia of Igor Sikorsky's pioneering four-engined Sikorsky Russky Vityaz (Le Grand) and Sikorsky Ilya Muromets aircraft. From the start of the First World War in 1914 the four-engined Ilya Muromets class of aircraft were used as heavy bombers.

The German government saw the potential for large strategic bombers and issued a design standard which was used by several manufacturers to produce Riesenflugzeuge (giant aircraft) or R-Planes. The most successful design and manufacturing company of R-Planes was Zeppelin which was also the only company to manufacture them in series production, the R-VI.

== Legacy ==
Adolf Rohrbach went on to found his own aircraft company, Rohrbach Metall-Flugzeugbau where he designed and built a number of innovative civil all-metal airliners, such as the Ro-VIII trimotor as well as some groundbreaking flying boats.

The Smithsonian Institution's "Airspace Magazine" suggested that Rohrbach could have been Germany's Boeing or Douglas but that the Inter-Allied Commission deemed the E-4/20 too much of a threat as a potential bomber to be allowed to go into serial production and ordered its destruction, even declining offers to sell it to allied countries.

The 1932 Armstrong Whitworth Atalanta used a very similar configuration, differing in construction details and more powerful engines.

== Specifications ==
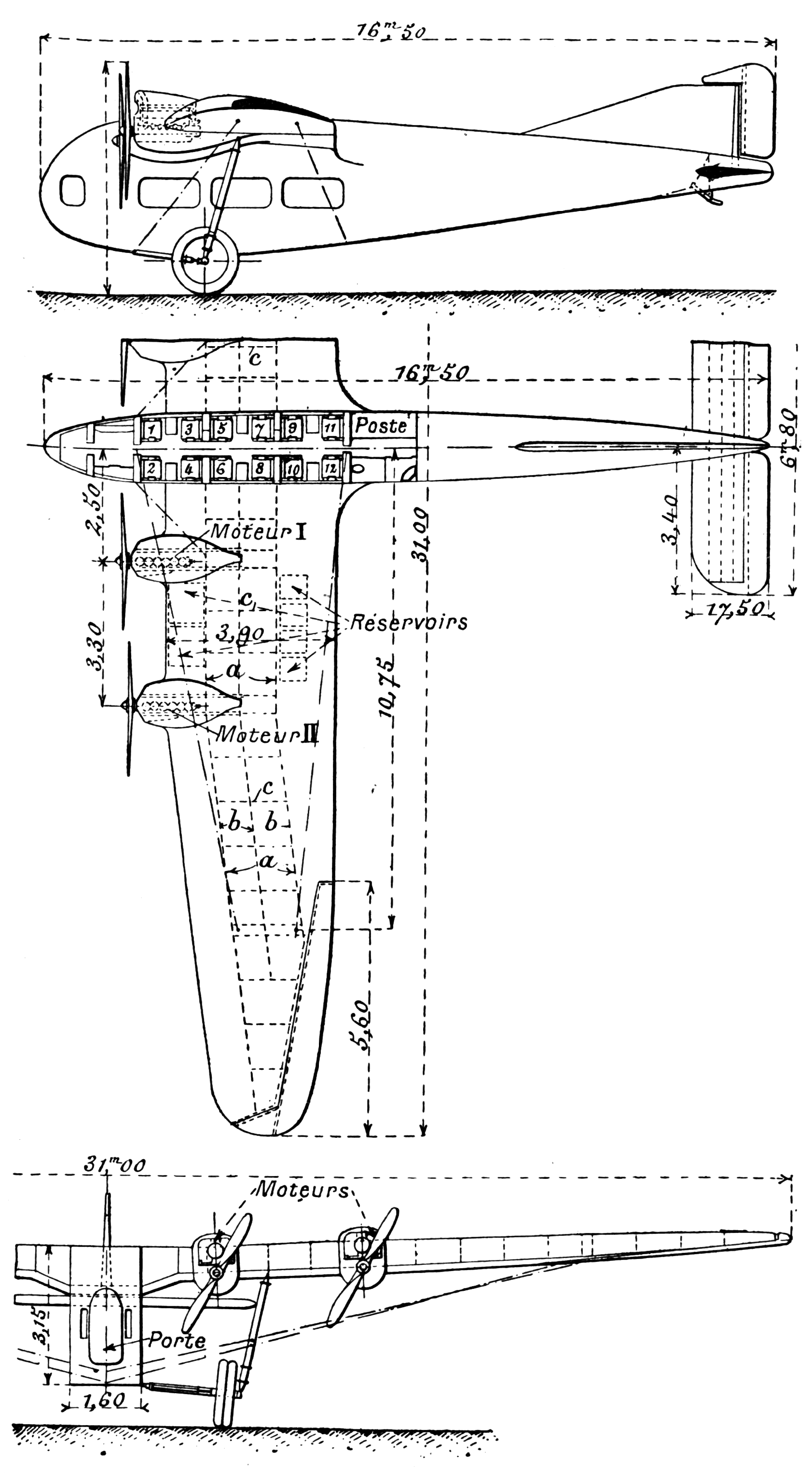
Zeppelin-Staaken E-4/20 3-view drawing from Le Génie Civil August 20, 1921

Data from

General characteristics

- Crew: 3–5
- Capacity: 12-18 pax
- Length: 16.6 m (54 ft 6 in)
- Wingspan: 31 m (101 ft 8 in)
- Height: 4.5 m (14 ft 9 in) approx.
- Wing area: 106 m^{2} (1,140 sq ft)
- Empty weight: 6,072 kg (13,386 lb)
- Gross weight: 8,500 kg (18,739 lb)
- Powerplant: 4 × Maybach Mb.IVa 6-cyl water-cooled in-line piston engines, 183 kW (245 hp) each
- Propellers: 2-bladed fixed pitch wooden propellers

Performance

- Maximum speed: 225 km/h (140 mph, 121 kn)
- Cruise speed: 200 km/h (120 mph, 110 kn)
- Range: 1,200 km (750 mi, 650 nmi)
- Endurance: 5–6 hours
- Wing loading: 80 kg/m^{2} (16 lb/sq ft)
- Power/mass: 0.09 kW/kg (0.055 hp/lb)
