= Albatros L 75 =

1920s German trainer biplane

L 75 Ass
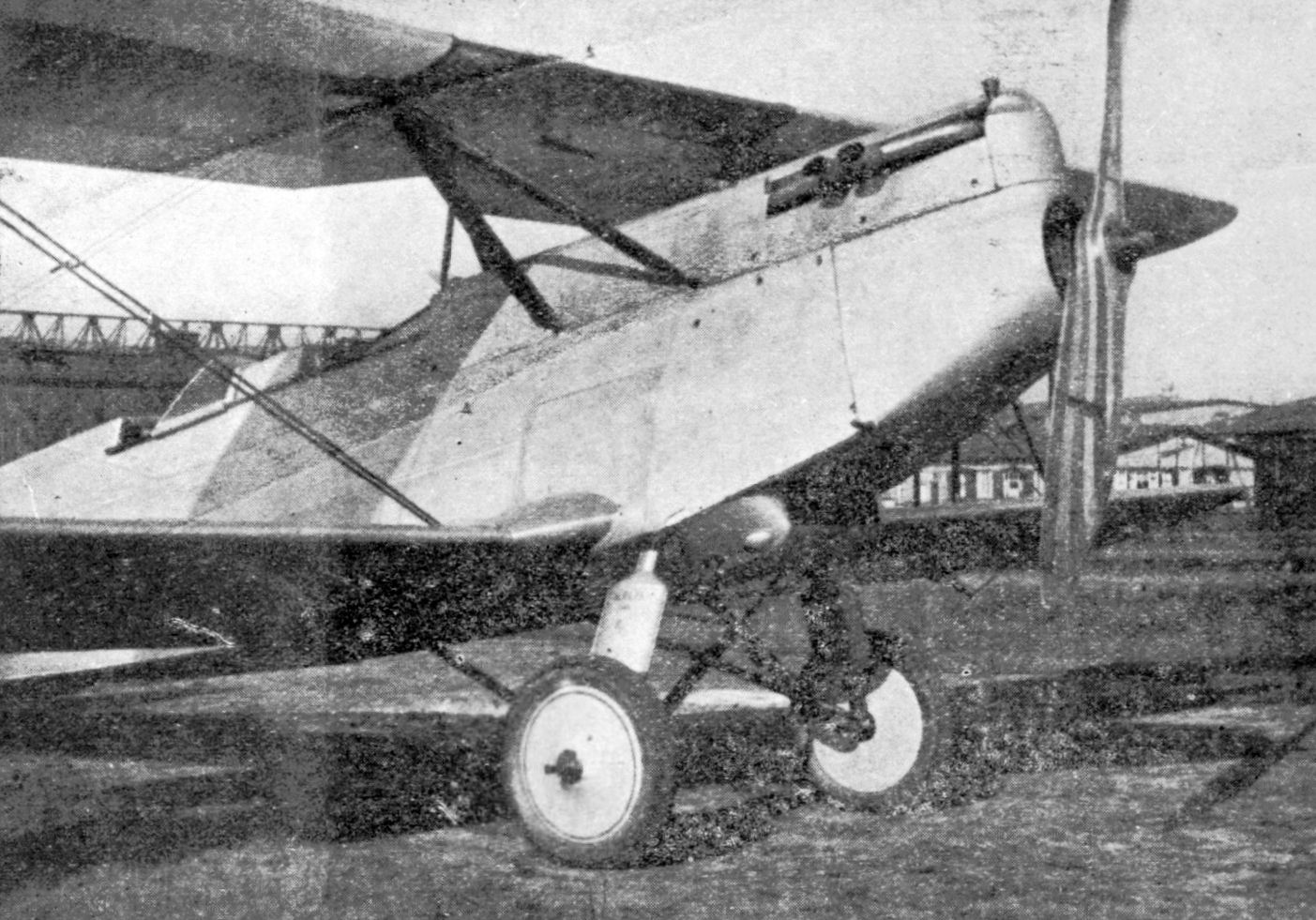

General information
- Type: Trainer
- Manufacturer: Albatros Flugzeugwerke
- Designer: Walter Blume
- Number built: 43

History
- First flight: 1928

The Albatros L 75 Ass (German, 'Ace') was a German trainer biplane of the 1920s. Of conventional configuration, it seated the pilot and instructor in separate, open cockpits. The wings were single-bay, equal-span, and had a slight stagger. Production continued after Albatros was absorbed by Focke-Wulf.

== Variants ==
- L 75 - prototype with BMW IVa engine
- L 75a - production version with BMW Va engine
- L 75b - with Junkers L5 engine
- L 75c - BMW Va engine
- L 75d - BMW Va engine
- L 75E - BMW Va engine
- L 75F - Junkers L5G engine
- L 75DSA - BMW Va engine
- L 75DSB - Junkers L5 engine

== Operators ==
- DVS

== Specifications (L 75a) ==
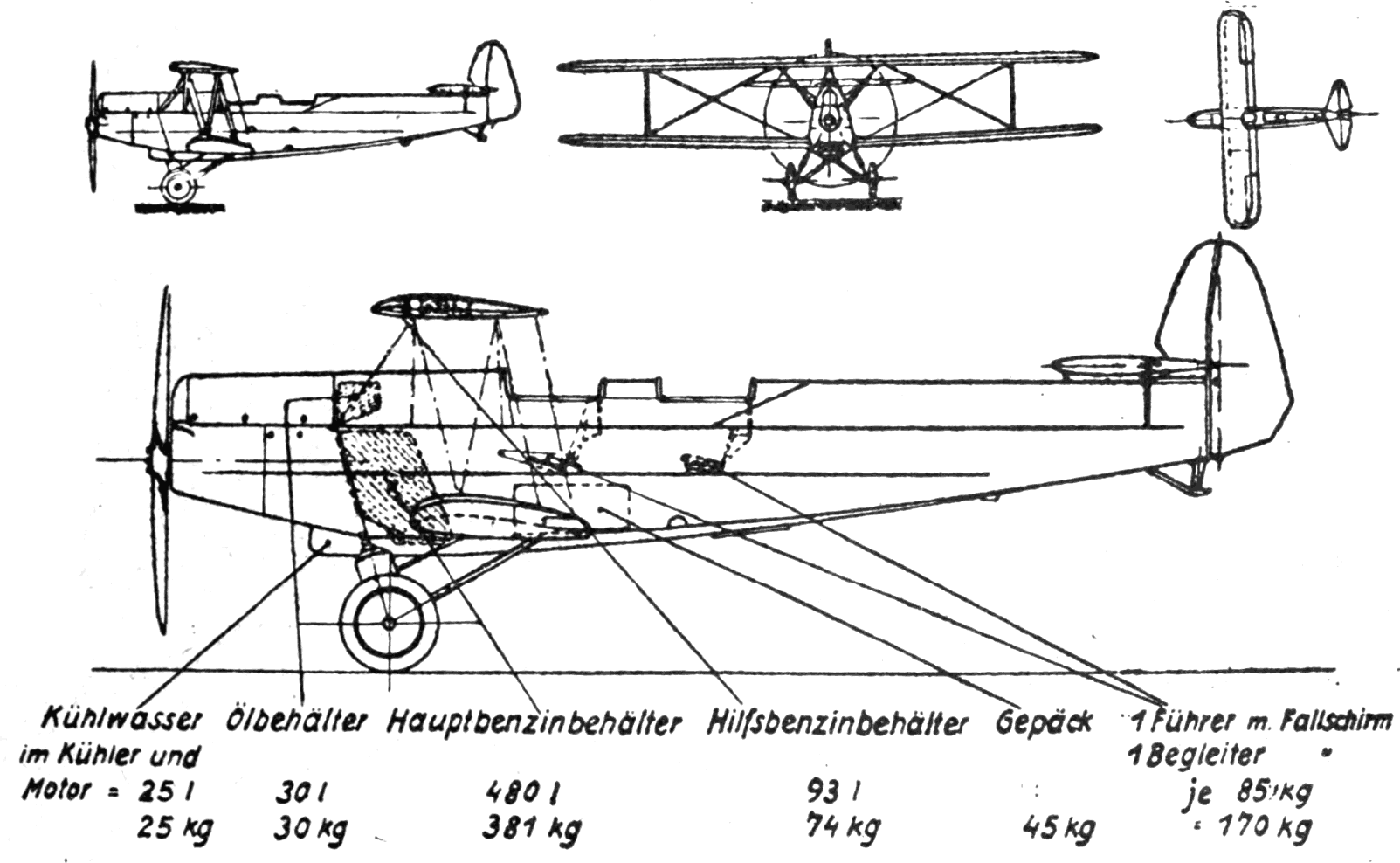
Albatros L 75 drawing from Le Document aéronautique November,1928

Data from Jane's all the World's Aircraft 1928, German Aircraft between 1919–1945

General characteristics

- Crew: 2
- Length: 10 m (32 ft 10 in)
- Wingspan: 12.5 m (41 ft 0 in)
- Height: 3.25 m (10 ft 8 in)
- Wing area: 37 m^{2} (400 sq ft)
- Empty weight: 1,150 kg (2,535 lb)
- Gross weight: 1,835 kg (4,045 lb)
- Fuel capacity: 480 L (130 US gal; 110 imp gal) main, 93 L (25 US gal; 20 imp gal) in reserve gravity-feed tank
- Powerplant: 1 × BMW Va six-cylinder in-line water-cooled piston engine, 270 kW (360 hp) for take-off 240 kW (320 hp) continuous
- Propellers: 2-bladed fixed pitch propeller

Performance

- Maximum speed: 217 km/h (135 mph, 117 kn)
- Cruise speed: 170 km/h (110 mph, 92 kn)
- Landing speed: 90 km/h (56 mph; 49 kn)
- Range: 1,600 km (990 mi, 860 nmi)
- Service ceiling: 5,500 m (18,000 ft)
- Time to altitude: 1,000 m (3,300 ft) in 7 minutes
- Wing loading: 59.8 kg/m^{2} (12.2 lb/sq ft)
- Power/mass: 0.1141 kW/kg (0.0694 hp/lb)
