= Rohrbach Ro III =

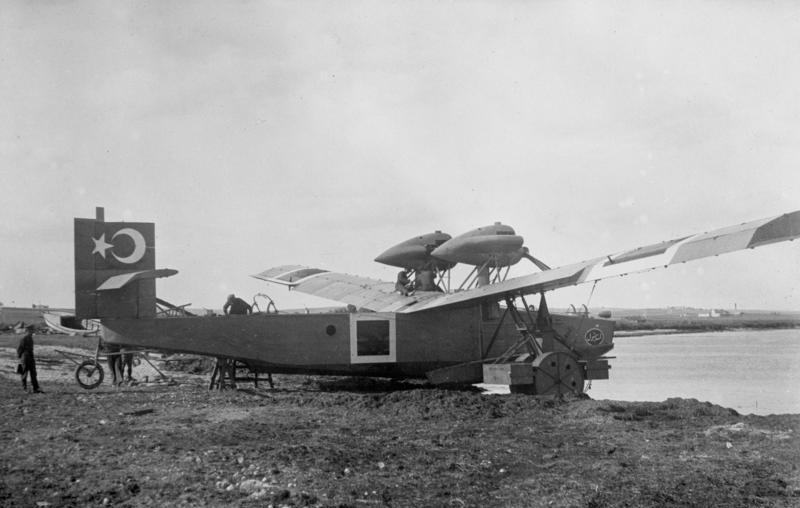
- A Rodra in Turkish Naval markings, November 1930

General information
- Type: Flying boat airliner or long-range reconnaissance aircraft
- National origin: Germany
- Manufacturer: Rohrbach Metall-Flugzeugbau
- Number built: at least six

History
- First flight: c.1924
- Developed from: Rohrbach Ro II

The Rohrbach Ro III was a twin-engined, all-metal flying boat built in Germany in the mid-1920s. A development of the Ro II, it could be configured either as an airliner or a reconnaissance aircraft. It was developed into the similar but more powerful Ro IIIa Rodra (Ro + dr(ei) + a), intended only as a military reconnaissance/bomber. Four Ro IIIs were bought by Japan and two Rodras by Turkey.

== Design and development ==
Dr.-Ing. Adolf Rohrbach gained his initial experience with light-alloy structures for aircraft with Zeppelin at Staaken but in 1922 he founded the Rohrbach Metall-Flugzeugbau GmbH in Berlin. At that time powered aircraft construction was banned in Germany by the Versailles Treaty, so he established a second factory in Copenhagen. His first completed design, the all-metal Rohrbach Ro II was built there, as was the Ro III but the Ro IIIa Rodra was built in Berlin after the Versailles conditions were relaxed in 1926. Completion and flight testing were nonetheless done in Copenhagen.

During its construction the Ro III was known as the Ro II series III, indicating its close similarity to its predecessor. The most obvious difference was a sharp bow to improve seaworthiness. It was advertised in two forms, either as a ten passenger airliner or a long range reconnaissance aircraft.

The Ro III had a cantilever high wing of strictly rectangular plan and thick aerofoil section. It had a span of 17.2 m (56 ft 5 in), an aspect ratio of 11.46, high for the time, and 6° of dihedral. Wing construction was similar to that of the Ro II, using duralumin throughout, with nose and rear box spars joined by the ribs and metal skin into a large box girder. It was attached to the fuselage sides at their tops. Balanced rectangular ailerons filled about 35% of the trailing edges out to the tips.

The Ro III was powered by a pair of 270 kW (360 hp) water-cooled V-12 Rolls-Royce Eagle IX engines strut-mounted close together above the wing, their propellers well ahead of the leading edge.

The hull, like the rest of the aircraft, was all-metal and rectangular, with flat sides and top. Its planing bottom was also flat, with two steps. Stability on the water was provided by long, stepless floats on each side, strut-mounted from the wings a little outside the engines and braced to the fuselage with a parallel pair of horizontal struts. The hull tapered in plan to the tail, where the empennage was again rectangular, with a broad fin reaching out beyond the end of the hull and carrying a balanced rudder. The tailplane was mounted on the fin about one third of the way up, braced from below with a single strut on each side, and carried narrow-chord elevators.

There was an open cockpit just ahead of the propeller discs. In military reconnaissance configuration it had a crew of three. Like some other Rohrbach flying boats, the Ro III carried a pair of masts and sails, to be used if the aircraft was forced to put down at sea without engine power.

In the first half of 1926, Rohrbach introduced the Ro IIIa Rodra. The new variant was more powerful, with two 340 kW (450 hp) Lorraine 12E Courlis W12 water-cooled engines in shorter and more streamlined cowlings, with their honeycomb radiators on the wing underside below them. The wing was mounted on top of the fuselage, its span reduced by 1.45 m (4 ft 9 in), and the ailerons were no longer compensated.

Designed only for the long range reconnaissance bomber role it had side-by-side dual controls and two gun positions, one in the nose and the other closer to the tail than the wing, both equipped with twin machine guns. The nose position was also used for observation and bomb-aiming; the bombs were mounted underwing beyond the floats.

== Operational history ==
Four Ro IIIs were delivered to Japan in 1925 as Rohrbach R-1s. Two of these had their original 270 kW (360 hp) Eagles engines replaced by 340 kW (450 hp) Hispano-Suiza or Lorraine 12E Courlis engines, and were re-designated R-2 and R-3. At least one Ro III appeared on the Japanese civil register as J-BHAE and was used by the Japan Airline Co. Mitsubishi bought a licence to build Rohrbach aircraft in Japan but it seems not to have been used.

Two Rodras were sold to the Turkish Navy and based at Smyrna. After four years of operation, they were given a lengthy examination by the German aviation authorities, who found them in good order and with no safety problems.

Two Rodras were bought by and tested by the RAF at Martlesham Heath.

== Variants ==
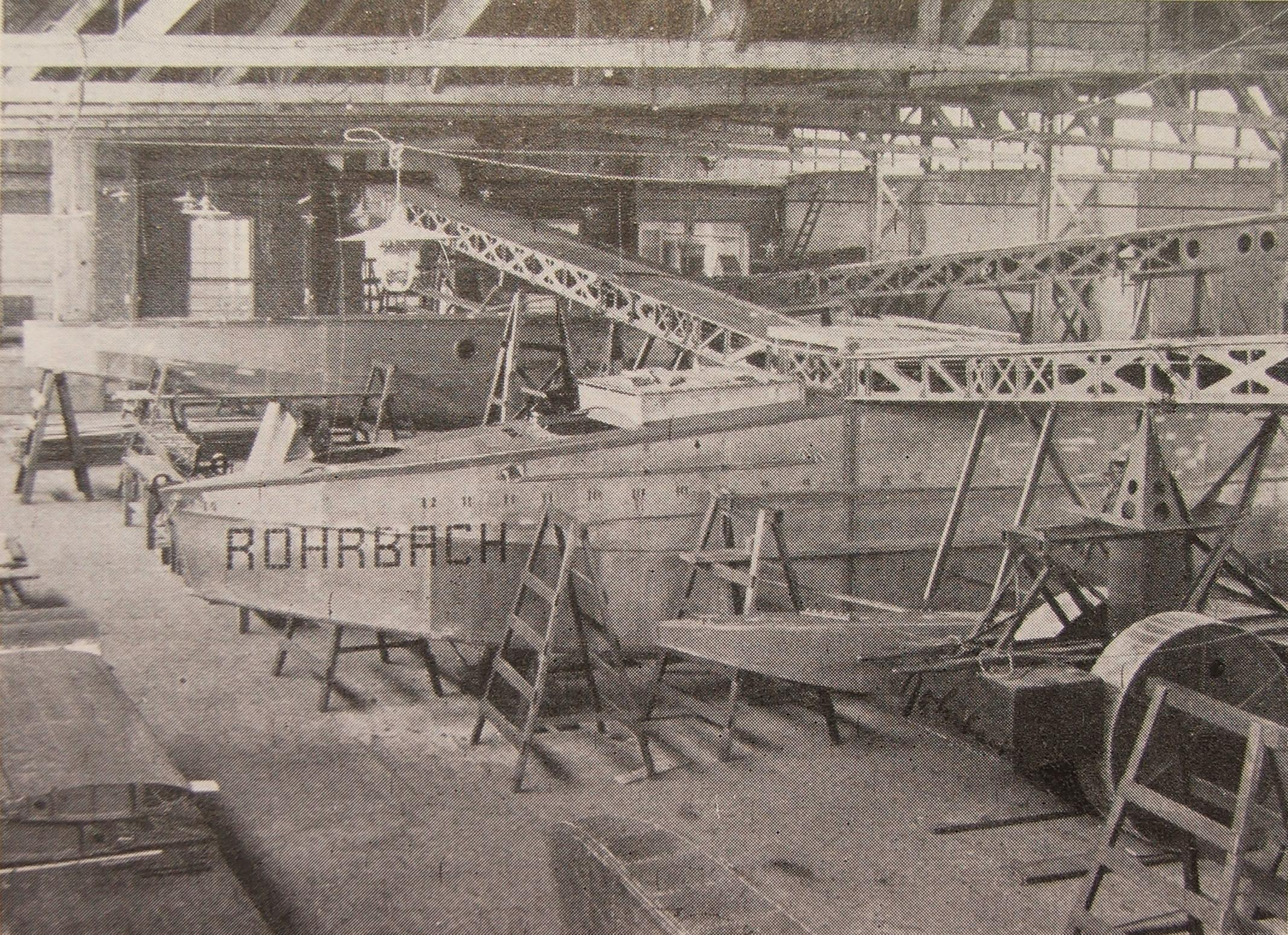
Rodra under construction, January 1927

Ro III
29 m (95 ft 2 in) span, 270 kW (360 hp) Rolls-Royce Eagle IX engines initially. Four sold to Japan where two were re-engined.
Ro IIIa Rodra
As described, two sold to Turkish Navy.

== Specifications (Ro IIIa Rodra) ==
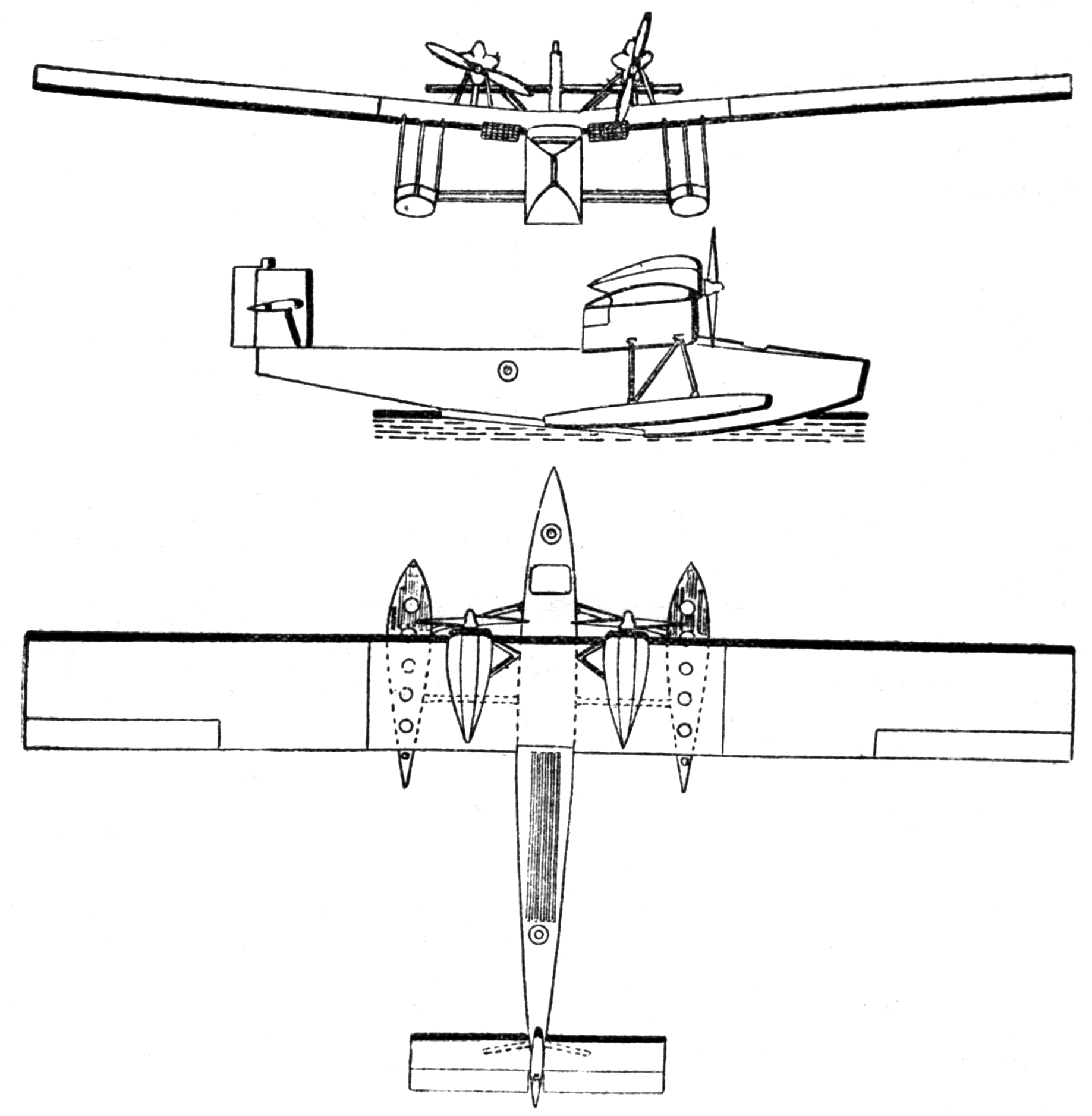
Rohrbach Ro.III Rodra 3-view drawing from Les Ailes March 31,1927

Data from Les Ailes, March 1927 except where noted

General characteristics

- Crew: Three
- Length: 17.20 m (56 ft 5 in)
- Wingspan: 27.55 m (90 ft 5 in)
- Height: 6.0 m (19 ft 8 in)
- Wing area: 73.40 m^{2} (790.1 sq ft)
- Aspect ratio: 10.3
- Empty weight: 3,900 kg (8,598 lb)
- Gross weight: 5,650 kg (12,456 lb)
- Powerplant: 2 × Lorraine 12E Courlis water-cooled W12, 340 kW (450 hp) each
- Propellers: 2-bladed

Performance

- Maximum speed: 195 km/h (121 mph, 105 kn)
- Endurance: 3 hr
- Service ceiling: 3,000 m (9,800 ft)
- Time to altitude: 17 min to 2,000 m (6,600 ft)
- Touchdown speed: 100 km/h (62 mph; 54 kn)

Armament

- Guns: Pairs of machine guns in nose and dorsal positions. total of 2,000 rounds.
- Bombs: 1,196 kg (2,637 lb)
