= Rohrbach Ro XI Rostra =

Ro XI Rostra
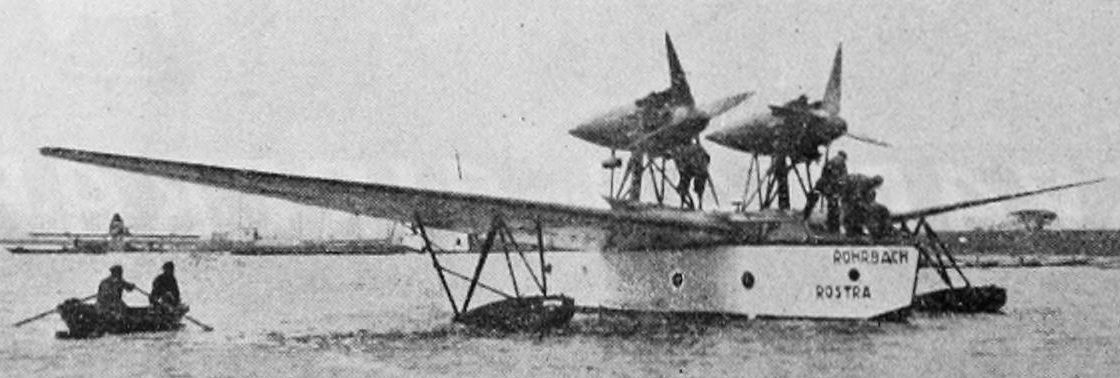

General information
- Type: Flying boat mail plane
- National origin: Germany
- Manufacturer: Rohrbach
- Number built: 1

History
- First flight: 30 October 1928

The Rohrbach Ro XI Rostra was a flying boat built in Germany in 1928 for use as a transatlantic mail plane.

== Design and development ==
The Ro XI shared the same general configuration its predecessor, the Ro V Rocco: a conventional, high-wing flying boat with cruciform empennage and two engines mounted tractor-fashion in nacelles mounted on struts above the wing. The flight deck and cabin were fully enclosed. However, while the Rocco's wings had been braced by struts, the Rostra's wings were a fully cantilever design. The aircraft featured a set of masts and sails that could be deployed for extended travel on water in the event of a forced landing.

By late 1928, Philadelphia journalist Mildred Johnson was organising an east-to-west transatlantic flight aboard the Rostra, initially with three other passengers, but later as the sole passenger. In middle of 1929, the Rostra made a preliminary 1,760 km (1,090 mi) round trip between Travemünde and Stockholm carrying ten passengers, and a longer-range flight to Iceland was planned.

== Specifications ==
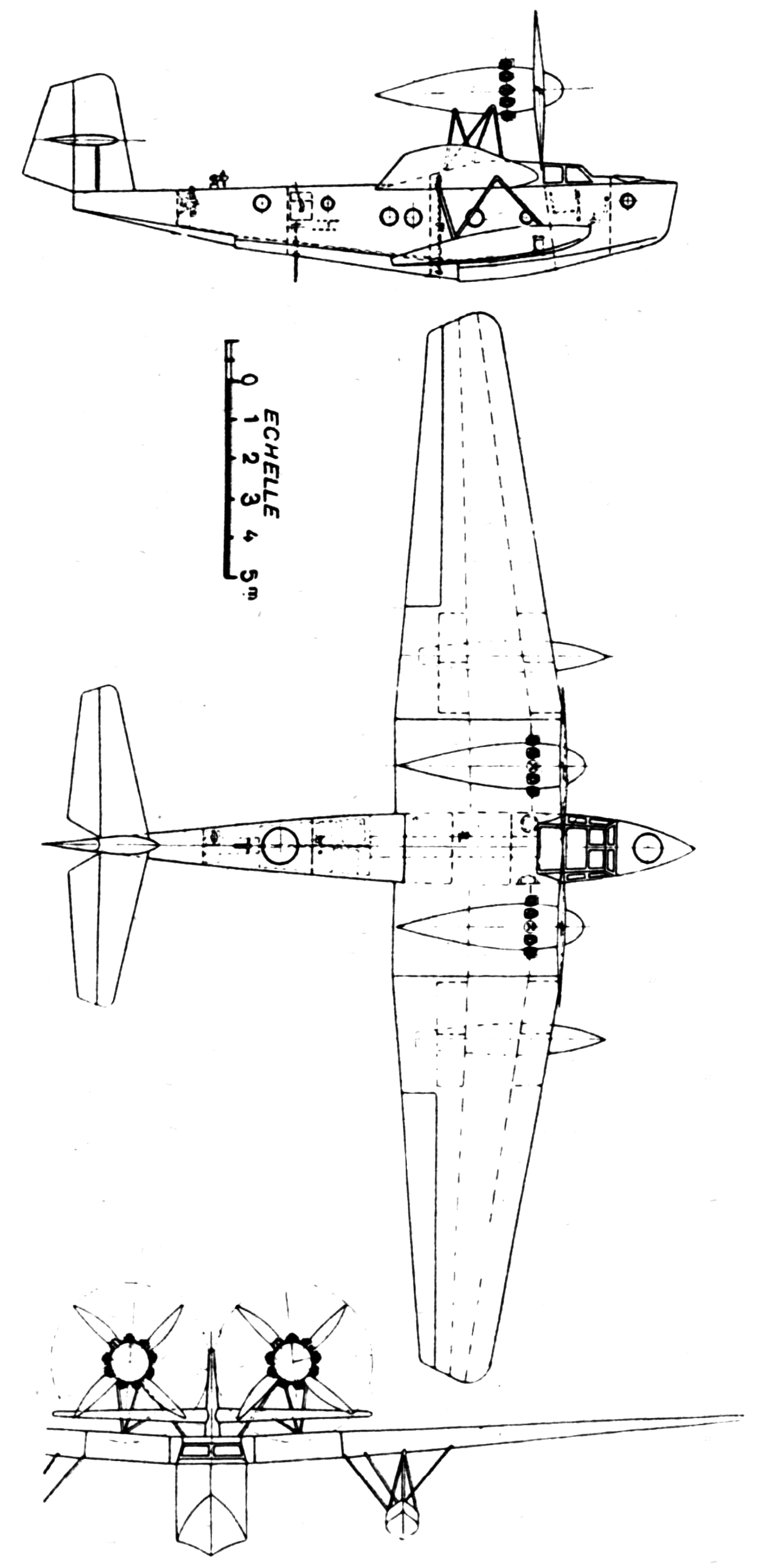
Rohrbach Ro XI Rostra 3-view drawing from L'Aérophile November,1928

Data from Rohrbach Ro XI Rostra - Histaviation

General characteristics

- Crew: 1 or 2
- Capacity: 4 or 5 pax
- Length: 15.60 m (51 ft 2 in)
- Wingspan: 26.90 m (88 ft 3 in)
- Height: 6.30 m (20 ft 8 in)
- Wing area: 77.0 m^{2} (828 sq ft)
- Empty weight: 4,340 kg (9,550 lb)
- Gross weight: 8,400 kg (18,480 lb)
- Powerplant: 2 × Gnome et Rhône-built Bristol Jupiter VI , 300 kW (400 hp) each

Performance

- Maximum speed: 220 km/h (140 mph, 120 kn)
- Range: 2,370 km (1,480 mi, 1,290 nmi)
- Service ceiling: 3,000 m (9,800 ft)

== See also ==
Related lists

- List of flying boats and floatplanes
