= Rohrbach Ro VIII Roland =

Ro VIII Roland
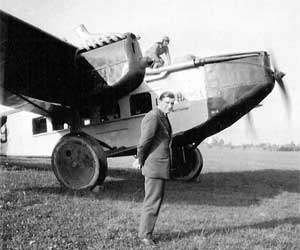

General information
- Type: Airliner
- National origin: Germany
- Manufacturer: Rohrbach
- Designer: Adolf Rohrbach
- Primary user: Deutsche Luft Hansa
- Number built: 18

History
- First flight: 1926

The Rohrbach Ro VIII Roland was an semi-cantilever monoplane trimotor airliner designed and produced by the German aircraft manufacturer Rohrbach. It was capable of unrivalled performance in some categories; during its early years, the type held no less than 22 world records.

The Roland, which performed its maiden flight in 1926, was promptly adopted by the German airline Deutsche Luft Hansa later that same year, using it on its route between Berlin and London via Hanover and Amsterdam. During 1928, Luft Hansa replaced three of its Rolands with a new variant, the Ro VIIIa, which had a stretched fuselage and were powered by the more powerful BMW V engines; the three withdrawn aircraft were quickly acquired by the Spanish airline, Iberia and used on its inaugural service between Madrid and Barcelona. In 1929, Rohrbach produced nine examples of a substantially updated Roland for Luft Hansa, which featured a major redesign of the flight deck, and a new wing design. Referred to as the Roland II, these aircraft continued in service with the airline until 1936 on its Hamburg–Malmö and Berlin–Munich routes.

Luft Hansa's Rowlands were sold onto numerous other operations, including Deruluft and the Luftwaffe, the latter opting to arm the type and operated it from its clandestine school at Lipetsk to train bomber crews. During his 1932 election campaign, Adolf Hitler hired a Ro VIII airliner from Deutsche Luft Hansa to conduct his two first series of campaign flights in March and July; this aircraft was named Immelmann I after the First World War-era pilot Max Immelmann.

== Design ==
The Rohrbach Ro VIII Roland was a semi-cantilever monoplane trimotor aircraft. It was loosely based on the Zeppelin-Staaken E-4/20, an earlier aircraft that had also been designed by Adolf Rohrbach. It had a fully enclosed flight deck and passenger cabin along with fixed conventional undercarriage. Power was supplied by three engines, one in the nose, and two mounted in nacelles on the wings. Metal construction was present throughout.

The aircraft conformed with the Rohrbach system of construction, which included extensive use of duralumin, accommodation for easy inspection and replacement of all components, and a relatively strength-to-weight ratio. The aircraft had a rectangular-shaped fuselage with rounded upper edges; the wing was also rectangular in shape, except for its rounded wingtips. The aircraft was capable of flying for up to five hours while carrying its maximum capacity of ten passengers. The undercarriage arrangement consisted of hinged axles that attached to the lower fuselage's longeron, which was held in place by a single horizontal strut that was also hinged to the same longeron in a slightly more forward position. It was also connected with the wing via a vertical spring strut. Spiral springs were present on the vertical struts that functioned as shock absorbers. The wheels consisted of rubber tyres, steel rims, and wire spokes.

The cockpit was located in the forward portion of the fuselage. Each of the two pilots were provided with adjustable seats, complete with armrests and straps, positioned in a side-by-side arrangement. Dual flight controls were provisioned, which consisted of wheels and rudder bars. Certain controls, such as the throttle, were arranged so that they could be manipulated either jointly or individually. Separate fuel gauges were installed to indicate the levels of each tank. Exterior visibility was favourable in all directions, even to the rear, both above and below the wing.

Electricity was supplied by a windmill-driven generator and several 12v storage batteries. Standard instrumentation included three revolution counters (one for each engine), six thermometers (for both oil and coolant), an altimeter, air-speed meter, three chronometers, and a single compass. Special apparatus, such as a specialised altimeter for night flights, a gyroscopic inclinometer, and an onboard search light, were available for installation at customer request. Illuminated instrumentation was provided, along with landing and position lights. The cockpit was typically accessed via an exterior walkway that ran along the top of the fuselage to the tail; it could also be accessed via an interior door to the passenger cabin.

The passenger cabin featured numerous luxurious fittings for the era; these included leather upholstering around the window sills and cloth set above, openable windows (controlled via hand cranks), plywood flooring, racks for hand baggage, overhead ventilation, cabin heating (drawn from the engines), electric lighting, emergency exits via openings in the ceiling, and a toilet aft of the cabin. The forward portion of the passenger cabin could be used to carry a spare engine. A baggage compartment was present in the rear of the fuselage, which was also accessible from the passenger cabin as well as via an exterior hatch.

The aircraft was typically powered by three BMW Va in-line engines; two of these were positioned on steel girders suspended from the wings while the third engine was installed within the aircraft's nose. Engine start-up was typically achieved via the use of three large cylinders containing compressed air; exterior air cylinders could also be plugged directly into the starting lines of the aircraft via a connection point on the fuselage. The engines were relatively accessible for the era. Several radiators were used to cool the engines; the nose-mounted engine made use of a radiator positioned underneath the fuselage while units orientated laterally beneath the wings. The engines were regulated using push rods.

Fuel pumps were used to supply fuel from the tanks to the engines; numerous fire cocks were present along the fuel lines as well as fire extinguishers as protective measures. All of the fuel piping was run externally while the various pipes used for water, oil, gas, and air were colour coded in accordance with Germany industrial best practice of the era. An above-average oil supply was provided for along with a dedicated oil cooler. Piping ran within the wings, along with the rest of the interior wing structure, could be easily inspected as the trailing edge of the wing, which was hinged, could be readily swung open. The control rods for the ailerons ran just aft of the forward spar while the rods to actuate the elevators and rudder ran within the fuselage and had joints at several intervals.

The aircraft's wing has a visible dihedral and a single cable than ran between each half of the wing to the underside of the fuselage. The meeting point between the fuselage and the wings incorporated a patented design produced by Dr Rohrback; specially, beyond the standard two attachment points, it used a third point that was intentionally angled differently to the other two. The aircraft was fitted with an adjustable stabiliser, although such adjustments could only be performed on the ground; the vertical fin was not adjustable. The tailplanes and the wings shared similar construction, being built in longitudinal sections with a hollow middle section. All sections of the wing provided spare internal volume for the fitting of fuel tanks, which enabled the aircraft to achieve an impressive range when configured appropriately. The exterior covering was duralumin sheeting.

== Operational history ==
In 1926, Deutsche Luft Hansa purchased the prototype Roland, followed by five production examples over that year and the next. The production machines were built with open flight decks, although they were later enclosed, as on the prototype. These were put to work servicing a route between Berlin and London via Hanover and Amsterdam. In July 1927, the Roland held the world endurance record for a payload of 1,000 kg, having flown for 14 hours and 23 minutes, and the world distance record for a payload of 2,000 kg of 1,750 km (1,090 mi). At different times, the Roland held no less than 22 world records.

During 1928, Luft Hansa replaced three of its Rolands with new machines of slightly different design. Designated Ro VIIIa, these had a fuselage that was stretched by 30 cm (1 ft) and were powered by the more powerful BMW V engines in place of the BMW IVs fitted to the prototype and first production batch. A new Spanish airline, Iberia, purchased the three Rolands that Luft Hansa retired, and put them into service on its inaugural service between Madrid and Barcelona.

In 1929, Rohrbach produced nine examples of a substantially updated Roland for Luft Hansa. These featured a major redesign of the flight deck, and a new wing design. Dubbed the Roland II, these aircraft continued in service with the airline until 1936 on its Hamburg–Malmö and Berlin–Munich routes. Luft Hansa sold at least three of these aircraft to Deruluft upon retirement. The Luftwaffe acquired another one, armed it and operated it at the clandestine school at Lipetsk to train bomber crews.

During his 1932 election campaign, Adolf Hitler hired a Rohrbach Ro VIII Roland aeroplane from Deutsche Luft Hansa for his two first series of campaign flights in March and July. The aeroplane was named Niederwald. Hitler switched to a Ju 52 named Immelmann in November 1932.

== Popular culture ==
The Spanish Tibidabo Amusement Park in Barcelona got a real-size replica of that plane, painted red. It is the most famous ride in the park, opened on 23 September 1928, sometimes referred to as "the first flight simulator in the world", and called "L'avió" (Catalan for "the plane").

== Variants ==
Data from:German Aviation 1919 - 1945

Ro VIII Roland I
Initial version powered by three 250 PS (250 hp; 180 kW) BMW IV 6-cylinder in-line water-cooled engines.
Ro VIIIa Roland Ia
Three aircraft purchased by Deutsche Luft Hansa, with a 0.30 m (1 ft) fuselage stretch, powered by three 360 PS (360 hp; 260 kW) BMW V 6-cylinder in-line water-cooled engines.
Ro VIII Roland II
A significantly up-graded version for Deutsche Luft Hansa, with revised cockpit and re-designed wing, powered by three BMW V engines; nine built.

== Specifications (Ro VIIIa Roland Ia) ==
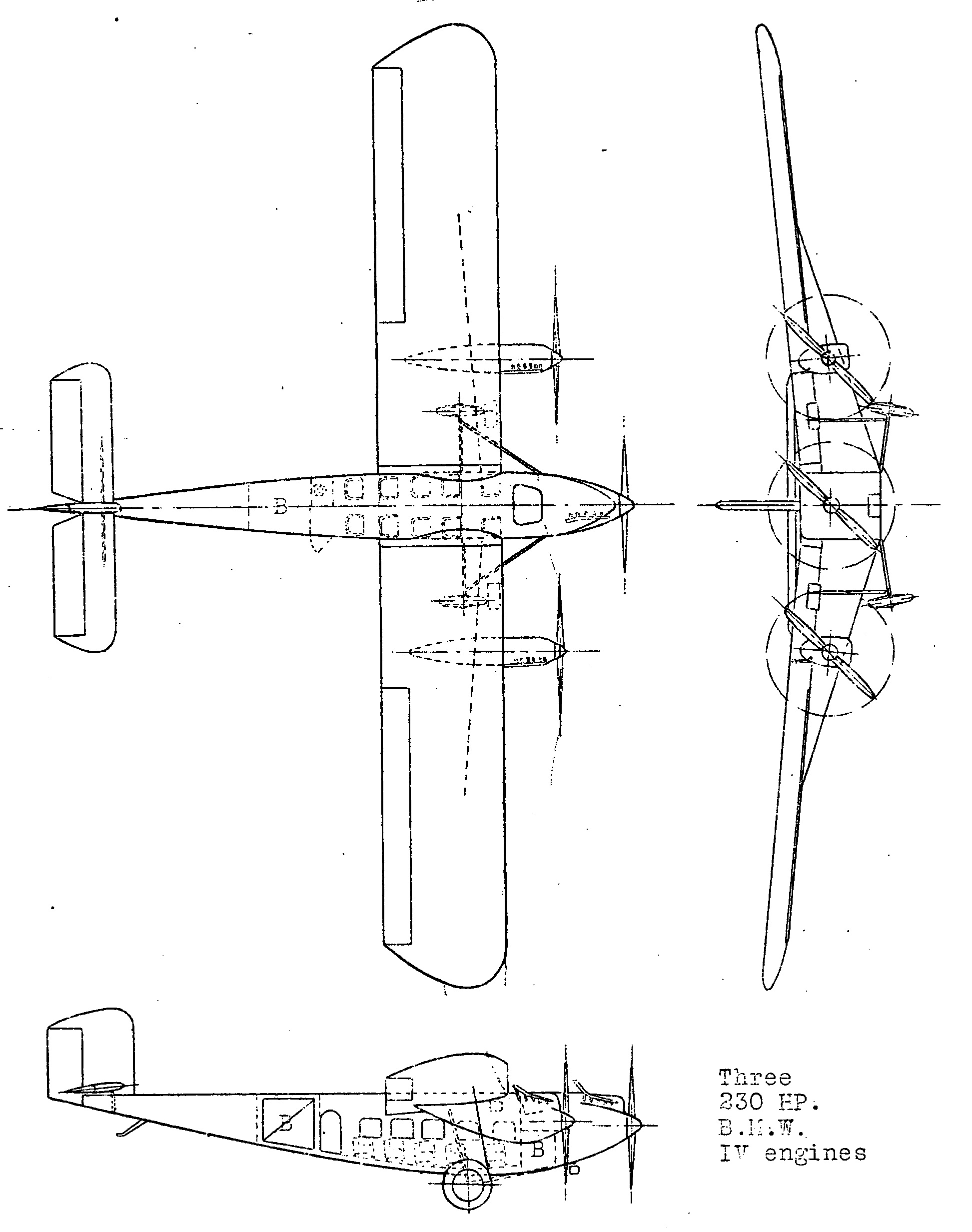
Rohrbach Ro.VIII 3-view drawing from NACA Aircraft Circular No.24

Data from Jane's all the World's Aircraft 1928, National Advisory Committee for Aeronautics

General characteristics

- Crew: 3 (two pilots and one engineer)
- Capacity: 10 passengers
- Length: 16.4 m (53 ft 10 in)
- Wingspan: 26 m (85 ft 4 in)
- Wing area: 88 m^{2} (950 sq ft)
- Empty weight: 4,900 kg (10,803 lb)
- Gross weight: 7,400 kg (16,314 lb)
- Powerplant: 3 × BMW Va six-cylinder in-line water-cooled piston engines 240 kW (320 hp) - 270 kW (360 hp) each

Performance

- Maximum speed: 204 km/h (127 mph, 110 kn)
- Cruise speed: 165 km/h (103 mph, 89 kn)
- Landing speed: 106 km/h (66 mph; 57 kn)
- Range: 875 km (544 mi, 472 nmi)
- Service ceiling: 4,200 m (13,800 ft)
- Time to altitude: 1,000 m (3,300 ft) in 5.5 minutes; 2,000 m (6,600 ft) in 13 minutes
- Wing loading: 84 kg/m^{2} (17 lb/sq ft)
- Power/mass: 0.0973 kW/kg (0.0592 hp/lb)
