= Paul Bäumer =

German flying ace (1896–1927)

- Born: 11 May 1896; Duisburg
- Died: 15 July 1927 (aged 31); Copenhagen, Denmark
- Military career
- Allegiance: German Empire; Weimar Republic
- Branch: Infantry, Luftstreitkräfte
- Service years: 1914–1918
- Rank: Leutnant
- Nickname: "Der Eiserne Adler" (The Iron Eagle)
- Units: FA 7, Jastas 2 & 5
- Awards: Pour le Mérite, Military Merit Cross, Iron Cross 1st & 2nd Class, Silver Wound Badge, House Order of Hohenzollern

Paul Wilhelm Bäumer (11 May 1896 – 15 July 1927), also known as The Iron Eagle, was a German fighter ace in World War I. Bäumer died in an air crash at Copenhagen on 15 July 1927, age 31, while test flying a Rohrbach Ro IX fighter. Rohrbach's test pilot had already been involved in a spinning accident, and Bäumer, acting as a freelance test pilot, continued the testing and died after the aircraft entered a spin and crashed in the Øresund.

== Background ==
Bäumer was born on 11 May 1896 in Duisburg, Germany. He was a dental assistant before World War I, and earned a private pilot's license by the summer of 1914.

== Involvement in World War I ==
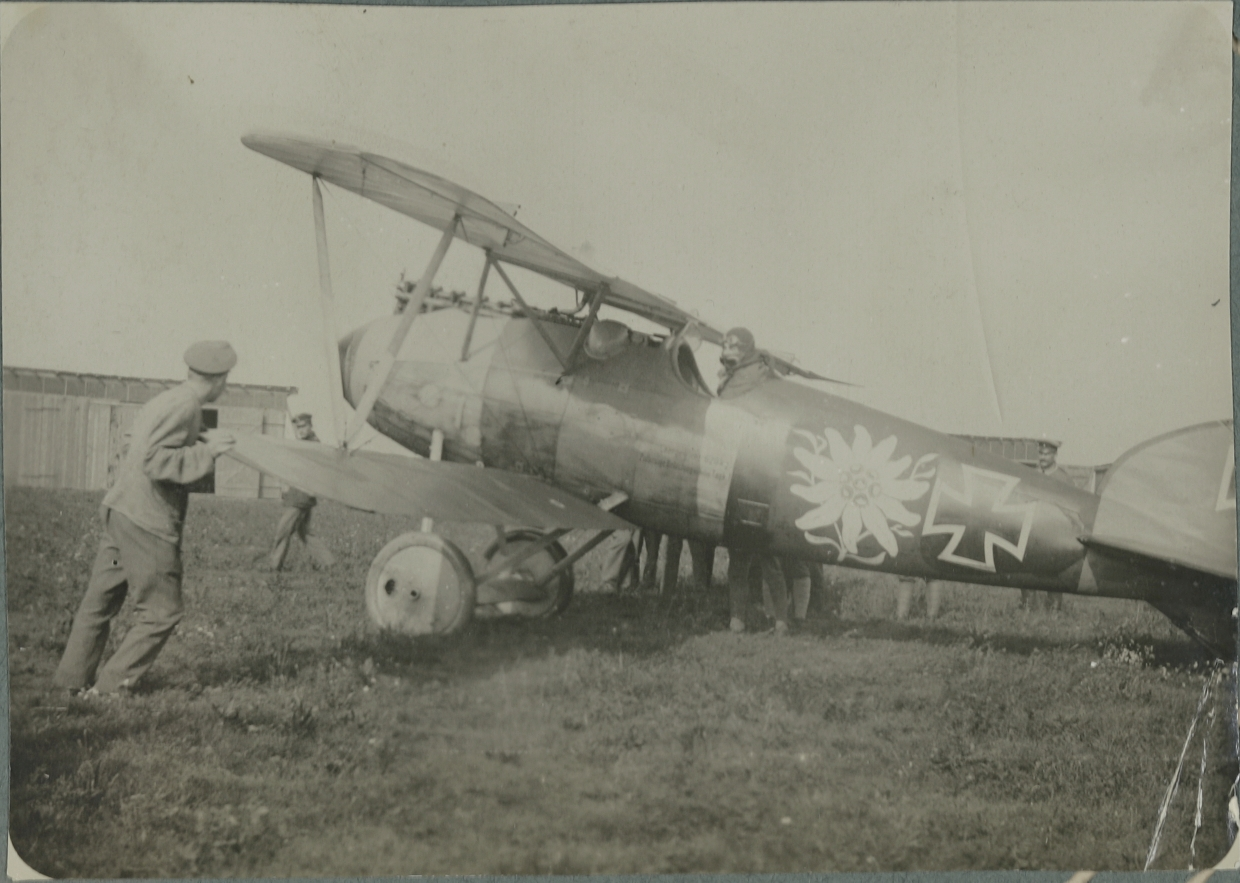
Paul Bäumer's Albatros D.V fighter aircraft, 1917

At the start of the war, he joined the 70th Infantry Regiment. He served in both France and Russia, being wounded in the arm in the latter. He then transferred to the air service as a dental assistant before being accepted for military pilot training.

By October 1916, he was serving as a ferry pilot and instructor at Armee Flugpark 1. On 19 February 1917, he was promoted to Gefreiter. On 26 March, he was assigned to Flieger Abteilung 7; he was promoted to Unteroffizier on the 29th.

On 15 May 1917, he was awarded the Iron Cross Second Class. He subsequently received training on single-seaters, consequently being posted to fighter duty. Bäumer joined Jagdstaffel 5 on 30 June 1917, scoring three victories as a balloon buster in mid-July before going to the elite Jasta Boelcke.

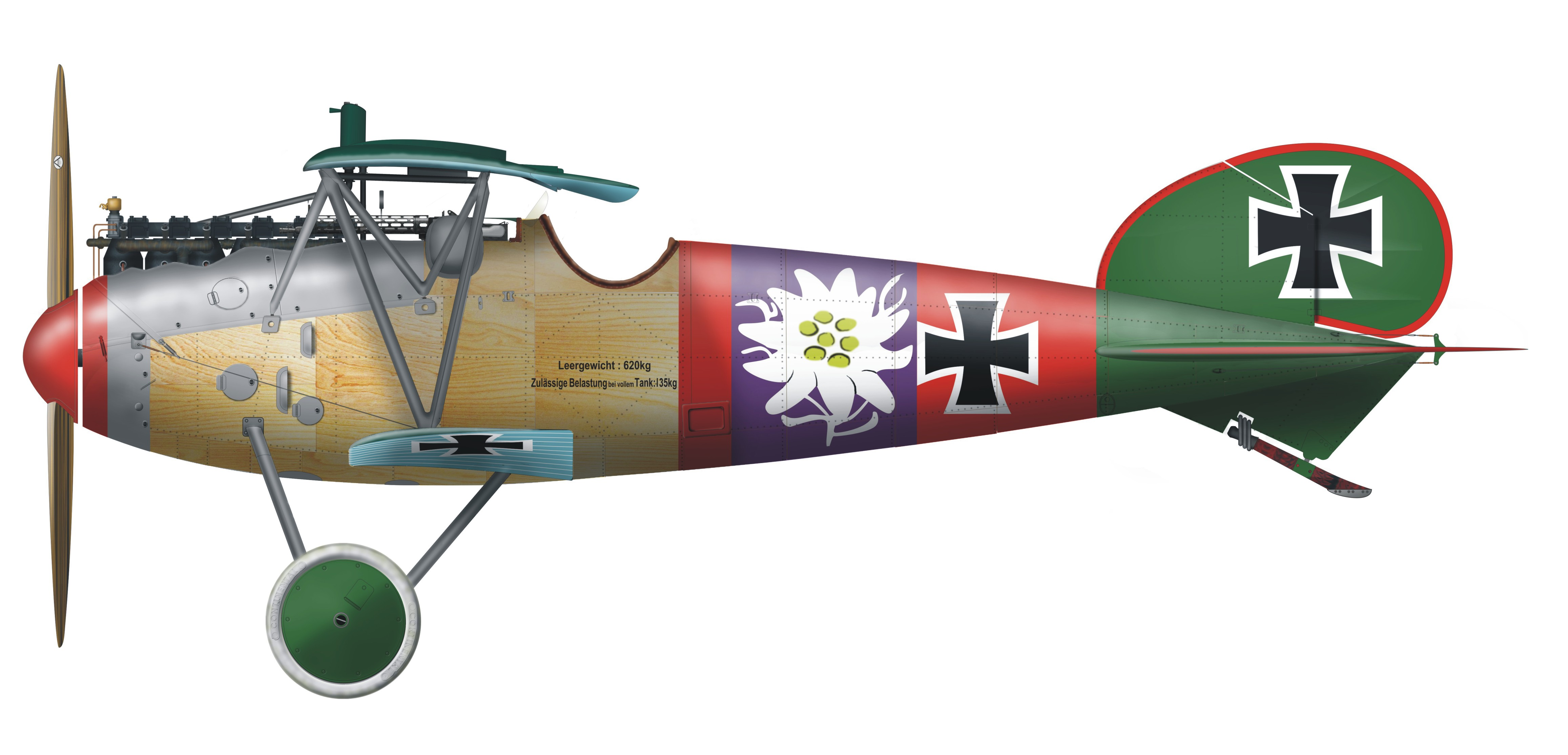
Albatros D.V of Paul Bäumer while with Jagdstaffel 5

Bäumer claimed heavily, reaching 18 victories by year end. He was commissioned in April 1918. On 29 May Bäumer was injured in a crash, breaking his jaw, and he returned to the Jagdstaffel in September. With the arrival of the Fokker D.VII he claimed even more success, including 16 in September. He flew with a personal emblem of an Edelweiss on his aircraft. He was one of the few pilots in World War I whose lives were saved by parachute deployment, when he was shot down in flames in September. He received the Pour le Mérite shortly before the Armistice and was finally credited with 43 victories, ranking ninth among German aces.

== Post-war career ==
After the war, Bäumer worked briefly in the dockyards before he became a dentist, and reportedly one of his patients, Erich Maria Remarque, used Bäumer's name for the protagonist of his antiwar novel All Quiet on the Western Front.

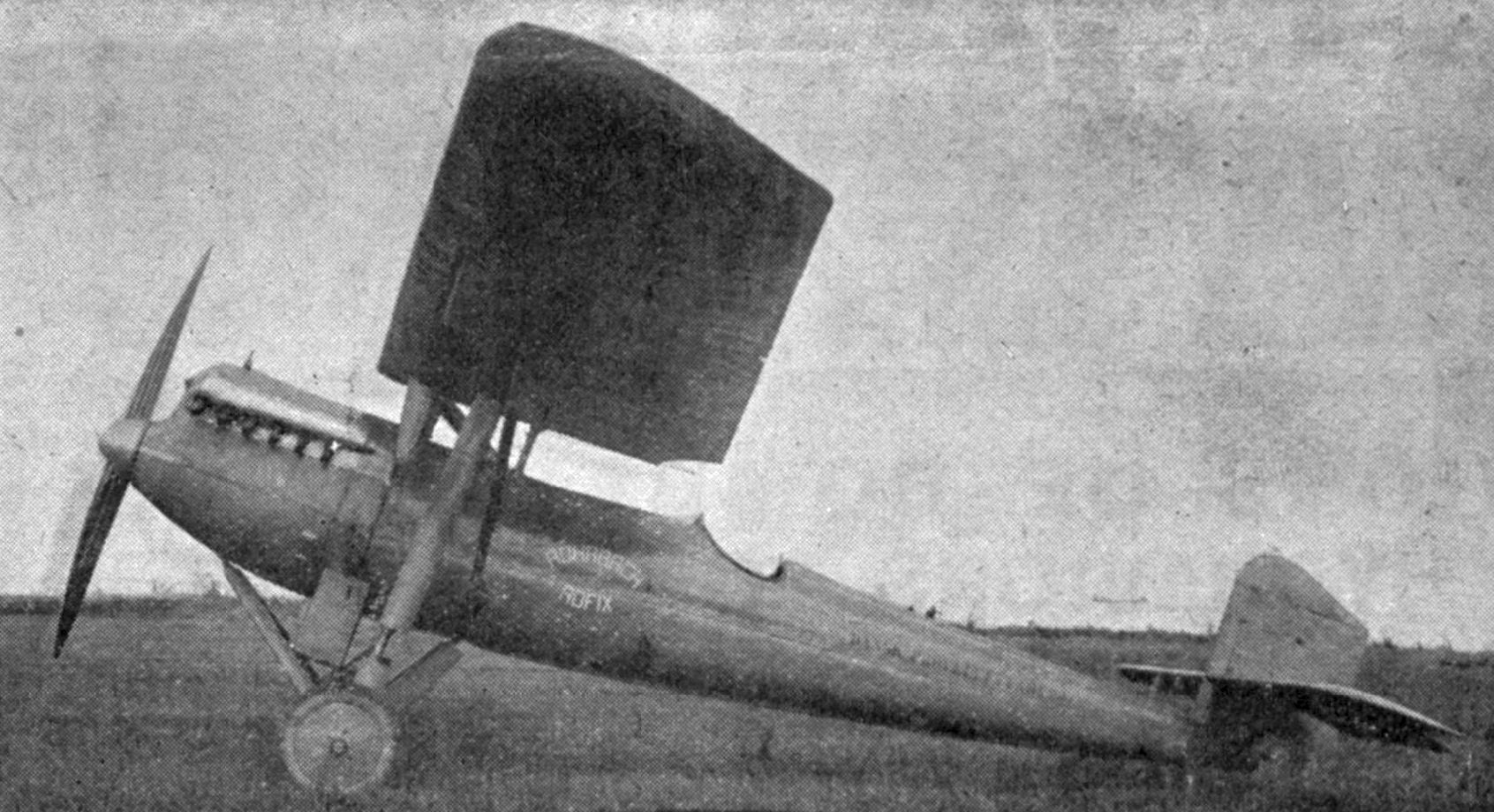
Bäumer was killed testing a Rohrbach Ro IX fighter.

Continuing his interest in flying, he founded his own aircraft company in Hamburg. Bäumer died in an air crash at Copenhagen on 15 July 1927, age 31, while test flying a Rohrbach Ro IX fighter, Rohrbach's test pilot had already been involved in a spinning accident, and Bäumer, acting as a freelance test pilot, continued the testing and died after the aircraft entered a spin and crashed in the Øresund.

== Bibliography ==
- "Casualty Compendium". Archive. No. 1. Air-Britain. 1981. p. 27.
- "Casualty Compendium: Part 2". Archive. No. 2. Air-Britain. 1981. pp. 53–55.
- Franks, Norman; et al. (1993). Above the Lines: A Complete Record of the Fighter Aces of the German Air Service, Naval Air Service, and Flanders Marine Corps 1914–1918. London: Grub Street. ISBN 9780948817731.
