= Albatros L 73 =

L 73
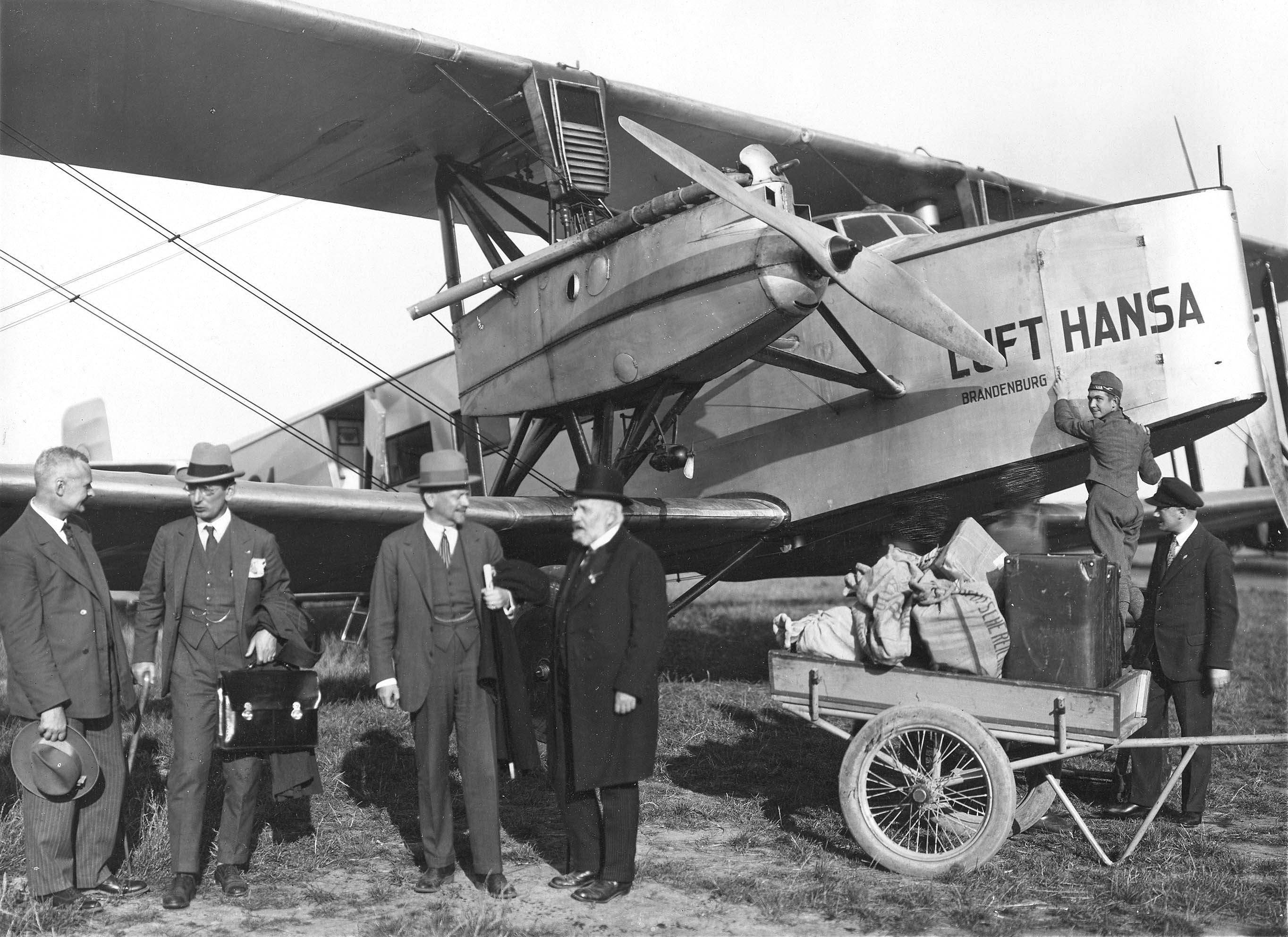
- D-961 Brandenburg at the opening of Stettin Airstrip in 1927. Second from left the Stockholm Municipal commissioner Yngve Larsson.

General information
- Type: Airliner
- Manufacturer: Albatros Flugzeugwerke
- Designer: Gustav Lachmann
- Primary user: Deutsche Luft Hansa
- Number built: 4

History
- First flight: 1926

The Albatros L 73 was a German twin-engined biplane airliner of the 1920s. Of conventional configuration, it featured a streamlined, boat-like fuselage and engine nacelles. All four manufactured aircraft of that type were operated by Deutsche Luft Hansa, one of which (Brandenburg, D-961) crashed near Babekuhl on 28 May 1928.

== Variants ==
L 73a
powered by two 310 kW (420 hp) Siemens-built Bristol Jupiter.
L 73b
version with Junkers L5 engines
L 73c
engines upgraded to BMW V

== Operators ==
Bulgaria

- Bulgarian Air Force

Germany

- Deutsche Luft Hansa

== Specifications (L 73b) ==
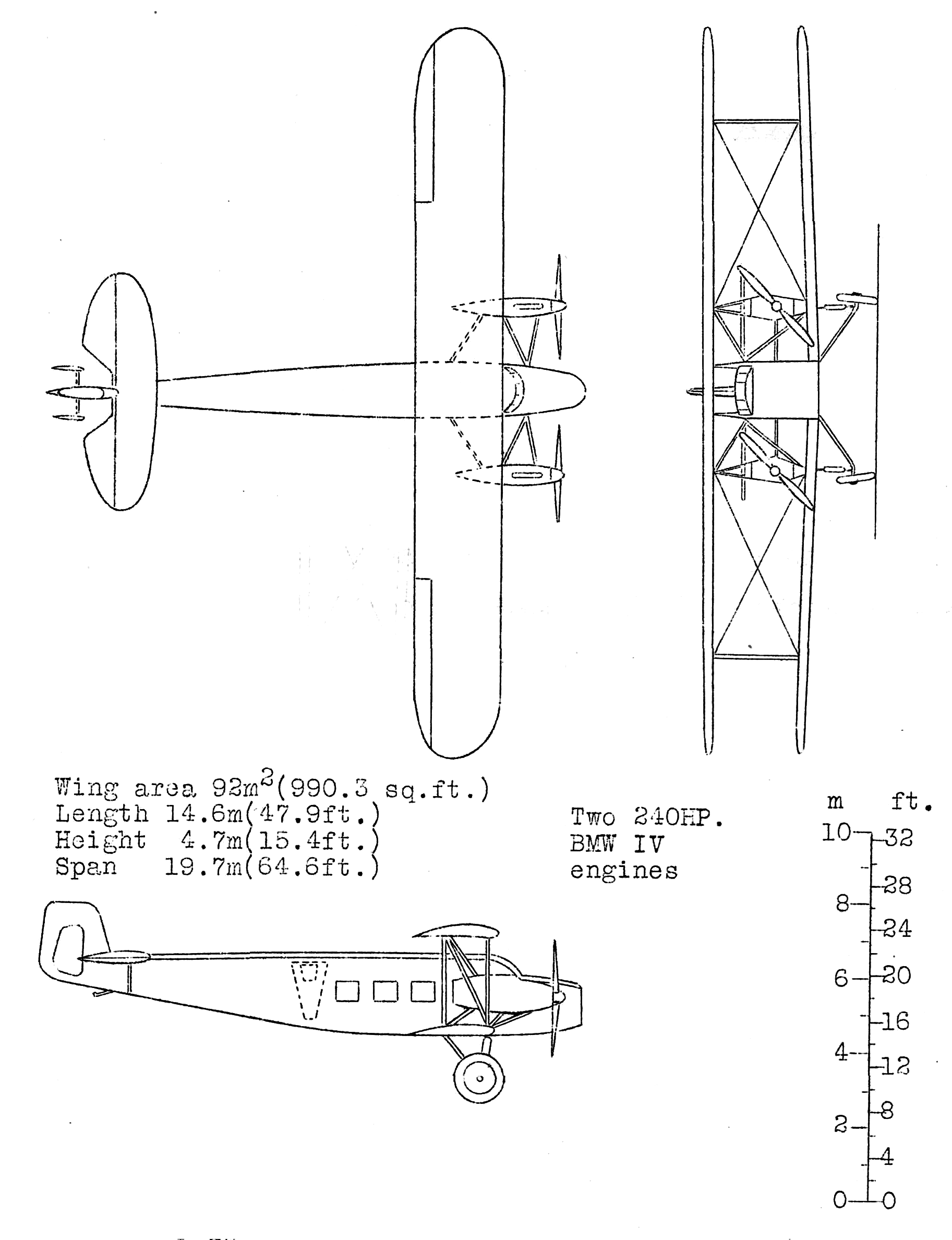
Albatros L 73 3 view drawing from NACA Aircraft Circular No.16

Data from The Albatros L.73

General characteristics

- Crew: Two (pilot and engineer)
- Capacity: Eight passengers
- Length: 14.6 m (47 ft 11 in)
- Wingspan: 19.7 m (64 ft 8 in)
- Height: 4.7 m (15 ft 5 in)
- Wing area: 92 m^{2} (990 sq ft)
- Empty weight: 2,914 kg (6,424 lb)
- Gross weight: 4,610 kg (10,163 lb)
- Powerplant: 2 × BMW IV six-cylinder, water-cooled Inline engine, 180 kW (240 hp) each

Performance

- Maximum speed: 145 km/h (90 mph, 78 kn)
- Range: 540 km (340 mi, 290 nmi)
- Service ceiling: 3,000 m (9,800 ft)
- Time to altitude: 14 minutes to 1,000 m (3,300 ft)
