= Stressed skin =

Type of rigid construction

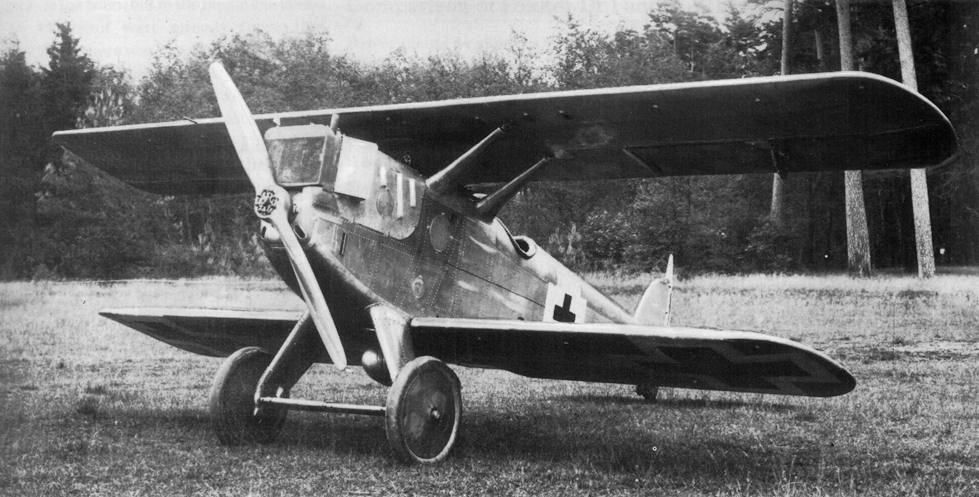
The Zeppelin-Lindau D.I had stressed skin fuselage and wings.

In mechanical engineering, stressed skin is a rigid construction in which the skin or covering takes a portion of the structural load, intermediate between monocoque, in which the skin assumes all or most of the load, and a rigid frame, which has a non-loaded covering. Typically, the main frame has a rectangular structure and is triangulated by the covering; a stressed skin structure has localized compression-taking elements (rectangular frame) and distributed tension-taking elements (skin).

== Description ==
A rectangular box can be distorted with a small load (left), but adding a diagonal member to form a triangular truss results in a more rigid structure (right)

A simple framework box with four discrete members is not inherently rigid as it will distort from being square under relatively light loads; however, adding one or more diagonal element(s) that take either tension or compression makes it rigid, because the box cannot deviate from right angles without also altering the diagonals. Sometimes the diagonal elements are flexible like wires, which are used to provide tension, or the elements can be rigid to resist compression, as with a Warren or Pratt truss; in either case, adding discrete diagonal members results in full frame structures in which the skin contributes very little or nothing to the structural rigidity.

The square frame (black members) resist compression while the skin (translucent pink), which is fixed to the frame (blue rivets), resists in-plane shear that would distort the frame from square

In a stressed-skin design, the skin or outer covering is bonded or pinned to the frame, adding structural rigidity by serving as the triangulating member which resists distortion of the rectangular structure. The skin provides a significant portion of the overall structural rigidity by taking the in-plane shear stress; however, the skin provides very little resistance to out-of-plane loads.

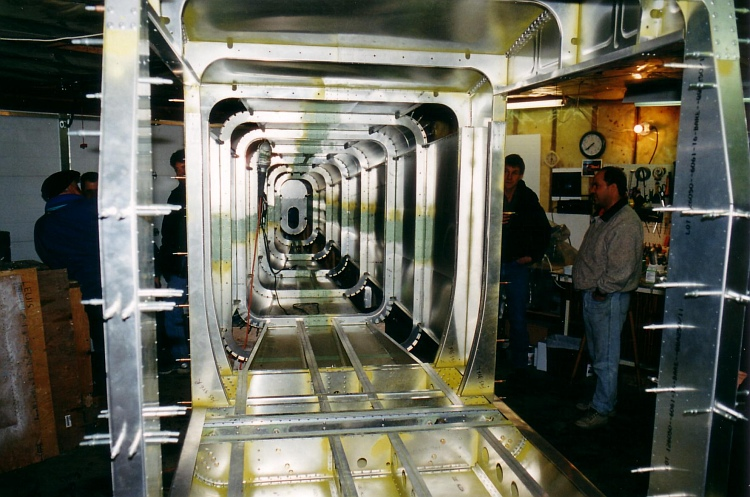
Internals of stressed skin construction on Murphy Moose showing frames and supporting skin

These types of structures may also be called semi-monocoque to distinguish them from monocoque designs. There is some overlap between monocoque, semi-monocoque (stressed skin), and rigid frame structures, depending on the proportion of the structural rigidity contributed by the skin. In a monocoque design, the skin assumes all or most of the stress and the structure has fewer discrete framing elements, sometimes including only longitudinal or lateral members. In contrast, a rigid frame structure derives only a minor portion of the overall stiffness from the skin, and the discrete framing elements provide the majority.

This stressed skin method of construction is lighter than a full frame structure and not as complex to design as a full monocoque.

=== History ===
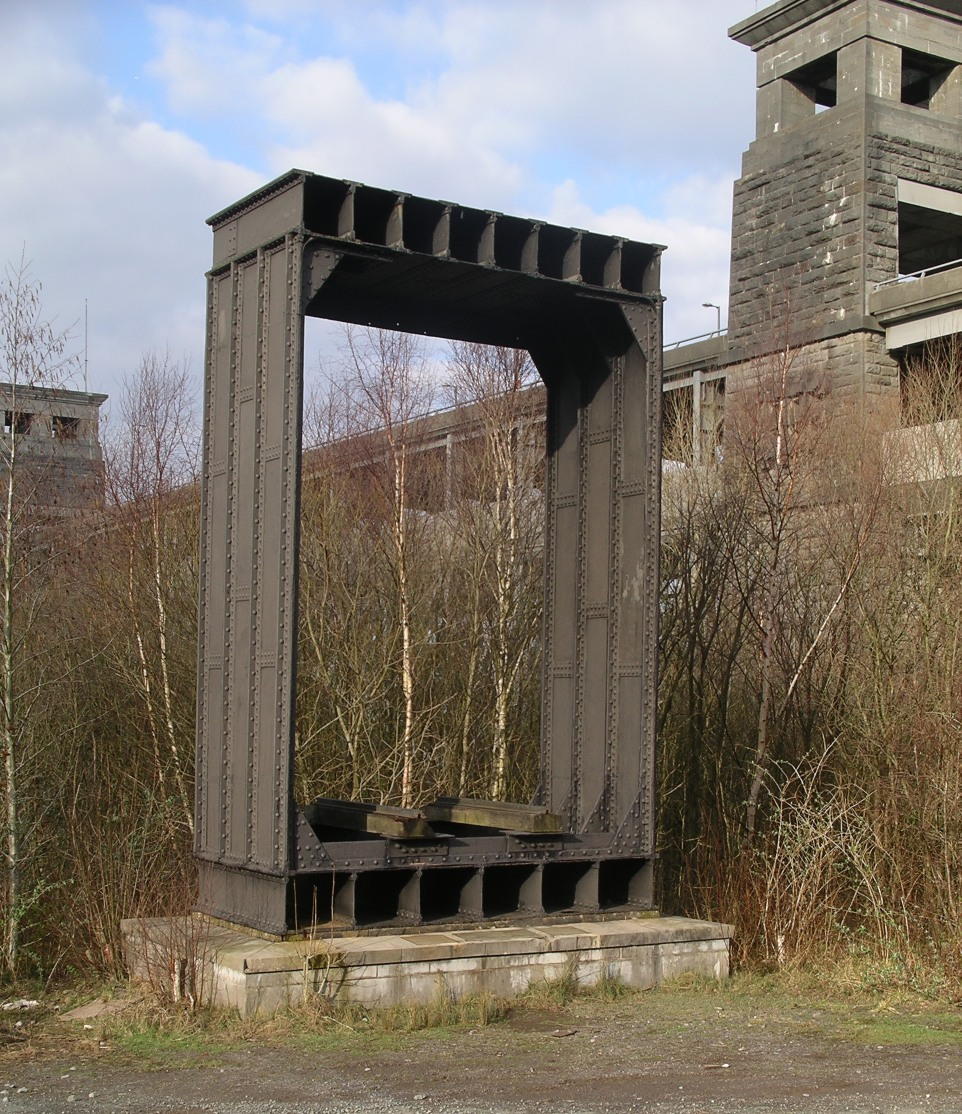
Section from the original Britannia Bridge, showing top and bottom stressed-skin construction

William Fairbairn documented the development of the Britannia and Conwy tubular bridges for the Chester and Holyhead Railway in 1849; in it, Fairbairn describes how Robert Stephenson enlisted his aid to revise Stephenson's original concepts, which would route rail traffic inside riveted steel tubes, supported by chains, with a circular- or egg-shaped cross-section. Experiments with scale models led Fairbairn to suggest a hollow rectangular beam instead, with longitudinal stringers on top and bottom fixed firmly to structural coverings: "two longitudinal plates, divided by vertical plates so as to form squares, calculated to resist the crushing strain in the first instance, and the lower parts [...], also longitudinal plates, well-connected with riveted joints, and of considerable thickness to resist the tensile strain in the second". This has been credited as the first instance of stressed skin design, also known as sandwich or double hull.

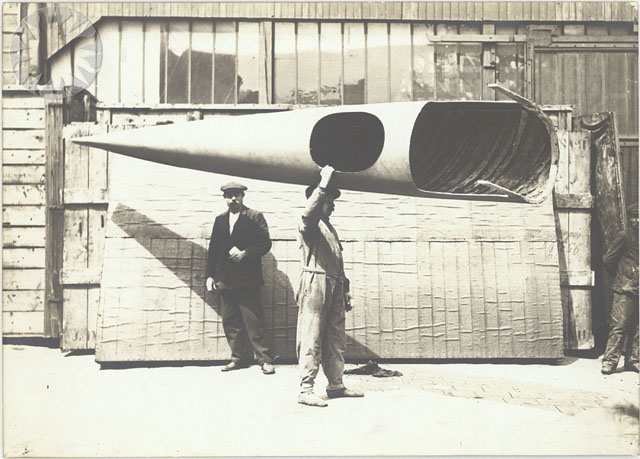
Worker carrying partially finished Deperdussin Monocoque fuselage, c. 1912

The first aircraft from the early 1900s were constructed with full frames consisting of wood or steel tube frame members, covered with varnished fabric or plywood, although some companies began developing monocoque structures which were built by bending and laminating thin layers of tulipwood. Oswald Short patented an all-metal, stressed-skin wing in the early 1920s. Dr.-Ing Adolf Rohrbach is credited with coining the term "stressed skin" in 1923. By 1940, duralumin sheets had replaced wood and nearly all new designs used monocoque construction.

The adoption of stressed-skin construction resulted in improved aircraft speed and range, accomplished by reduced drag through smoother surfaces, elimination of external bracing, and providing internal space for retractable landing gear.

== Examples ==
Examples include nearly all modern all-metal airplanes, as well as some railway vehicles, buses and motorhomes. The London Transport AEC Routemaster incorporated internal panels riveted to the frames which took most of the structure's shear load. Automobile unibodies are a form of stressed skin as well, as are some framed buildings which lack diagonal bracing.

- Dornier-Zeppelin D.I (1918) : first all-metal stressed skin fighter and first with stressed skin wings
- Zeppelin-Lindau (Dornier) Rs.IV (1918) : first aircraft with an all-metal stressed skin fuselage to fly
- Zeppelin-Staaken E-4/20 (1919) : first all-metal stressed skin four-engine airliner
- Short Silver Streak (1920) : first all-metal British stressed skin aircraft
- Northrop Alpha (1930) : first American all-metal stressed skin aircraft
- GM New Look bus (1959) : stressed-skin bus, over 44,000 built since 1959, and many still in service
