= Rohrbach Ro II =

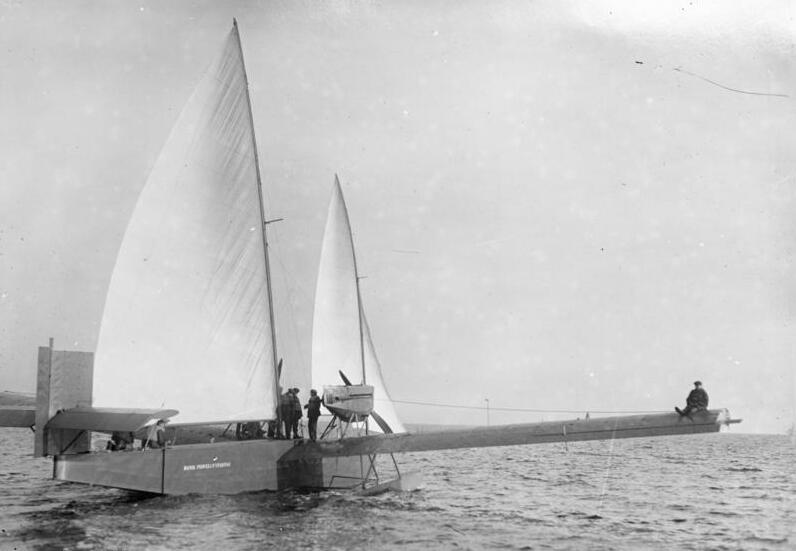
- The Rohrbach Ro II demonstrating its emergency sailing rig

General information
- Type: Flying Boat
- National origin: Germany
- Manufacturer: Rohrbach-Metall-Aeroplan Co. A/S, Copenhagen
- Designer: Adolf Rohrbach
- Number built: 1

History
- First flight: 11 November 1923

The Rohrbach Ro II was an all-metal, 4-seat reconnaissance and bomber flying boat, designed and produced in Germany in 1923.

== Development ==
Founded in 1923 by Dr.-Ing. Adolf Rohrbach, the Rohrbach Metall-Flugzeugbau GmbH designed and built many aircraft using light-alloy stressed skin construction methods that were at the cutting edge of aircraft design in the 1920s. His previous experience with light-alloys at the Zeppelin-Staaken factory served Rohrbach well when designing the Rohrbach stressed-skin aircraft.

After designing the un-built Ro I twin-engined flying boat, Rohrbach developed the Rohrbach Ro II flying boat as an all-metal shoulder winged monoplane flying boat with two tractor engines mounted in nacelles, above the wings, on struts. Planforms and profiles were kept as simple as possible with rectangular section fuselage frames (with vee planing bottoms), constant chord wings, tailplane and fin with square cut tips and distinctive protruding servo/trim/balance tabs at wing and fin tips. The two-seat open cockpit sat between the engines at the wing leading edge, with an open gunner/bosun's position at the extreme nose. The hull itself is divided into watertight compartments, such that the aircraft will stay afloat with any two compartments flooded. A very unusual feature of several of Rohrbach's flying-boats was the provision of a pair of masts and sails to be rigged in the event of engine failure, allowing the aircraft to be sailed back to a safe harbour.

At the time of the Ro II's production the Versailles Treaty forbade the construction of large aircraft in Germany so Rohrbach set up a Danish company, the 'Rohrbach-Metall-Aeroplan Co. A/S', to build the early Rohrbach aircraft. The strict regulation of the aircraft industry was relaxed in 1926, allowing the Rohrbach series to be built at the Rohrbach Metall-Flugzeugbau GmbH factory in Berlin.

== Operational history ==
The first flight of the Ro II took place on 11 November 1923, pilotted by Werner Landmann and the aircraft was used in FAI record attempts for speed/load on 24 October 1924. After trials and record attempts were completed the aircraft was sold to Mitsubishi Shoji Kaisha Ltd., re-designated Yokosho Experimental Type R 1 and used for trials by the Imperial Japanese Navy.

== Operators ==
- Imperial Japanese Navy

== Specifications ==
Data from

General characteristics

- Crew: 4
- Length: 16.5 m (54 ft 2 in)
- Wingspan: 27 m (88 ft 7 in)
- Height: 5.0 m (16 ft 5 in)
- Wing area: 73.4 m^{2} (790 sq ft)
- Empty weight: 3,700 kg (8,157 lb)
- Gross weight: 5,700 kg (12,566 lb)
- Powerplant: 2 × Rolls-Royce Eagle IX , 268 kW (360 hp) each
- Powerplant: 3 × sails - schooner rig for emergency surface propulsion

Performance

- Maximum speed: 165 km/h (102.5 mph, 89.1 kn)
- Stall speed: 110 km/h (68 mph, 59 kn)
- Service ceiling: 3,000 m (9.842 ft)

Armament

- provision for one or two machine guns in the nose gunners position
- unknown provisions for bombs
