= BMW V =

German six-cylinder aircraft engine (built in the 1920s)

- Type: Inline engine
- National origin: Germany
- Manufacturer: BMW
- Major applications: Albatros L 73; Albatros L 75
- Developed from: BMW IV

The BMW V was a six-cylinder, water-cooled inline aircraft engine built in Germany in the 1920s, with power of 240 kW (320 hp) for the production version, the BMW Va.

== Specifications (BMW Va) ==
Data from Pagé, p. 1516.

=== General characteristics ===
- Type: Six-cylinder inline piston engine
- Bore: 160 mm (6.30 in)
- Stroke: 190 mm (7.48 in)
- Displacement: 22.92 L (1,399 cu in)
- Length: 1,668 mm (65.7 in)
- Width: 635 mm (25.0 in)
- Height: 1,133 mm (44.6 in)
- Dry weight: 317 kg (699 lb)

=== Components ===
- Cooling system: Water-cooled

=== Performance ===
- Power output: 240 kW (320 hp) at 1560 rpm

== Applications ==
- Albatros L 73
- Albatros L 75
- Rohrbach Ro VII Robbe II

== Bibliography ==
- Pagé, Victor W. (1929). Modern Aviation Engines. New York City: Norman W. Henley. pp. 1513–1516. hdl:2027/mdp.39015023919429.
