= Rohrbach Ro IX Rofix =

1926 German all-metal, parasol-wing fighter

Rohrbach Ro IX
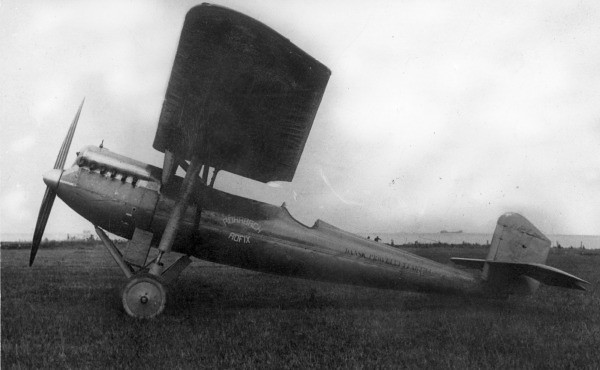
- Side view of the first prototype, November 1926

General information
- Type: Fighter aircraft
- National origin: Germany
- Manufacturer: Rohrbach Metall-Flugzeugbau
- Number built: 2 prototypes

History
- First flight: About September 1926

The Rohrbach Ro IX "Rofix" was a German all-metal, parasol-wing fighter designed to meet the requirements for a new fighter competition conducted by the Turkish Air Force during the mid-1920s. A pair of prototypes were ordered, but both crashed during flight testing, killing one pilot, and further development was cancelled.

== Background and description ==
In 1925 the Turkish Air Force decided to replace its obsolete SPAD S.XIII biplane fighters and announced a competition for modern aircraft. It received eight submissions from French and German companies and decided to order two prototypes each of the Dewoitine D.21, Nieuport-Delage NiD 42, Blériot-SPAD S.51, and the Rohrbach Ro IX Rofix for evaluation. Rohrbach Metall-Flugzeugbau received its contract in March 1926 that included an option for 28 additional aircraft and detail design work began at its Berlin factory under the supervision of Kurt Tank, designer of the Second World War-era Focke-Wulf Fw 190 fighter.

The Rofix had an oval-profile monocoque fuselage with the single-seat cockpit positioned unusually far aft behind the trailing edge of the wing which had a cutout to improve the pilot's visibility. The parasol wing was built around a single box girder spar and was connected to the fuselage with cabane struts. A single bracing wire extended from the wing to the bottom of the fuselage on each side. The aircraft was powered by a single closely-cowled, liquid-cooled 600-horsepower (450 kW) BMW VI V-12 engine. Its radiator protruded from the bottom of the fuselage between the struts for the conventional landing gear in line with the wing's leading edge. The Rofix was armed with a pair of 8-millimetre (0.315 in) machine guns that could be mounted in either the wings or in the upper forward fuselage. Each gun was provided with 250 rounds of ammunition.

== Construction and flight testing ==
Due to the restrictions of the Versailles Treaty that forbade the building of military aircraft in Germany, Rohrbach was forced to build the Rofix at its Danish factory in Copenhagen. Construction proceeded quickly and the company applied for a test-flight permit on 11 August 1926. Rohrbach reported that the first prototype was ready on 31 August and that the second one was almost complete, which probably meant that the Rofix made its first flight in early September. Test pilots reported that "handling was excellent and landing characteristics were good. The aircraft was well suited for aerobatics". Despite these positive reports flight testing revealed problems with the aircraft's spinning characteristics and the wing's dihedral had to be altered several times to correct the issues.

Despite these changes, the company's chief pilot, Werner Landmann, crashed the first prototype on 27 January 1927 while conducting spinning tests. The prominent First World War fighter ace Ernst Udet also flew the aircraft, probably after Landmann's crash, and commented that the pilot had a good view in all directions, even better than in the Fokker D.VII, the action of the elevators was good, but the ailerons were only partially effective, and the rudder was too small in a report that he submitted on 1 July. Another notable fighter ace, Paul Bäumer, was hired by Rohrbach to demonstrate the Rofix in Turkey and began to familiarise himself with the aircraft on 13 July in preparation for the acceptance trials. Two days later he began a spin at high altitude and could not recover from the spin, crashing with fatal results. The loss of the second prototype ended any possibility of further development and the option was cancelled, with an order for 10 D.21s ultimately being placed.

== Specifications ==
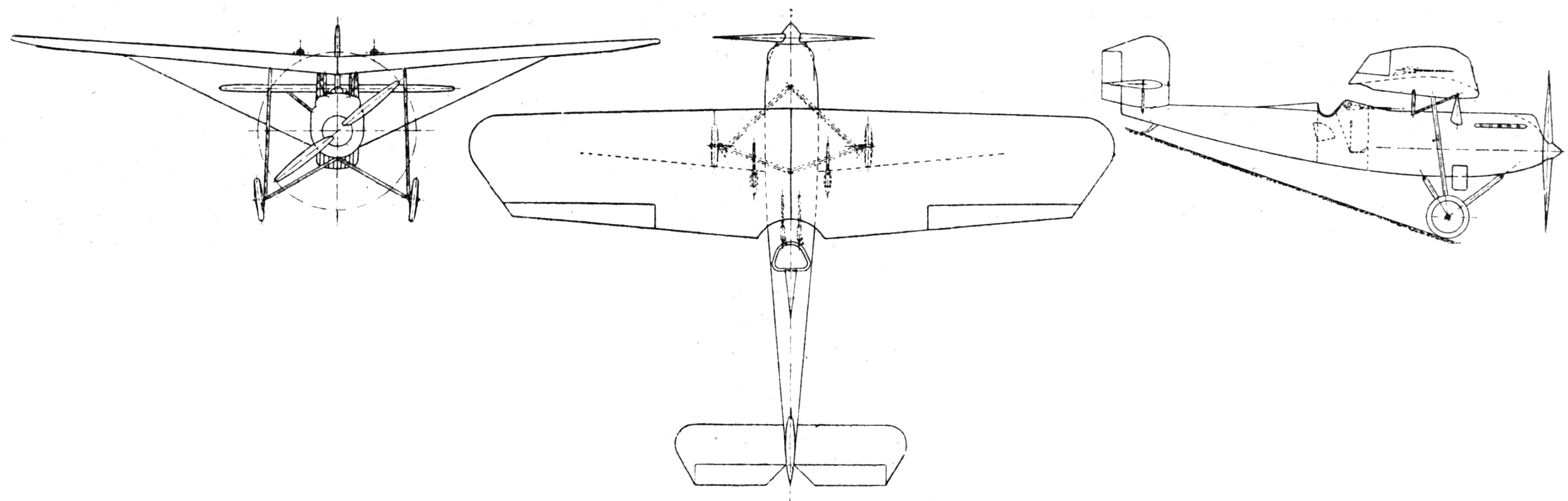
Rohrbach Rofix 3-view drawing from L'Aéronautique February,1927

Data from The Complete Book of Fighters: An Illustrated Encyclopedia of Every Fighter Built and Flown; Turkish Dismay: The Ill-Starred Rohrbach Ro IX Rofix Fighter

General characteristics

- Crew: 1
- Length: 9.50 m (31 ft 2 in)
- Wingspan: 14.00 m (45 ft 11 in)
- Height: 3.70 m (12 ft 2 in)
- Wing area: 28.0 m^{2} (301 sq ft)
- Empty weight: 1,320 kg (2,910 lb)
- Gross weight: 1,850 kg (4,079 lb)
- Powerplant: 1 × BMW VI water-cooled V-12 engine, 450 kW (600 hp)
- Propellers: 2-bladed

Performance

- Maximum speed: 285 km/h (177 mph, 154 kn)
- Range: 770 km (480 mi, 420 nmi)
- Service ceiling: 7,600 m (24,900 ft)
- Time to altitude: 2 minutes to 1,000 m (3,300 ft)
  - 14 minutes to 5,000 m (16,000 ft)
- Wing loading: 66.1 kg/m^{2} (13.5 lb/sq ft)

Armament

- Guns: 2 × fixed 8 mm (0.315 in) machine guns

== Bibliography ==
- Andersson, Lennart (2021). "Turkish Dismay: The Ill-Starred Rohrbach Ro IX Rofix Fighter". The Aviation Historian (35): 58–63. ISSN 2051-1930.
- Green, William & Swanborough, Gordon (2001) [1994]. The Complete Book of Fighters: An Illustrated Encyclopedia of Every Fighter Built and Flown (Revised and Updated ed.). London: Salamander Books. ISBN 1-84065-269-1.
