= Rohrbach Romar =

Ro X Romar
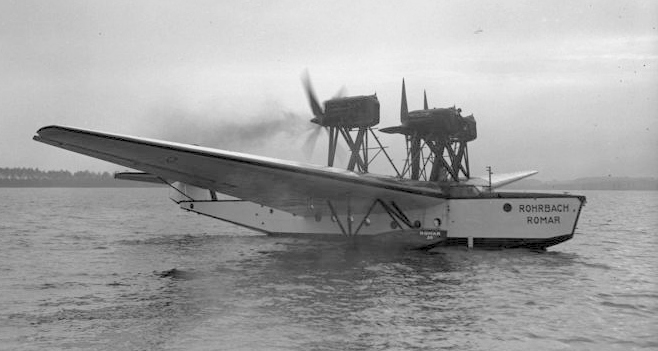

General information
- Type: Long-range commercial flying-boat
- National origin: Germany
- Manufacturer: Rohrbach Metall Flugzeugbau GmbH
- Primary users: Deutsche Luft Hansa French Navy
- Number built: 4

History
- First flight: 1928

The Rohrbach Ro X Romar was a German long-range commercial flying-boat and the last aircraft designed and built by Rohrbach Metall Flugzeugbau GmbH.

== Development ==
The Romar was the final production aircraft from Rohrbach and was a monoplane flying-boat with a crew of four or five and two cabins for a total of 12 passengers. The revised Romar II could accommodate 16 passengers. It had three BMW VIUZ Vee piston engines strut mounted above the wing. The first aircraft flew on 7 August 1928 and was unveiled at the Berlin Aviation Exhibition in October 1928. Only four aircraft were built, three were used on Baltic services by Deutsche Luft Hansa and one was supplied to the French Navy.

== Operators ==
France

- French Navy

Weimar Republic

- Deutsche Luft Hansa

== Specifications ==
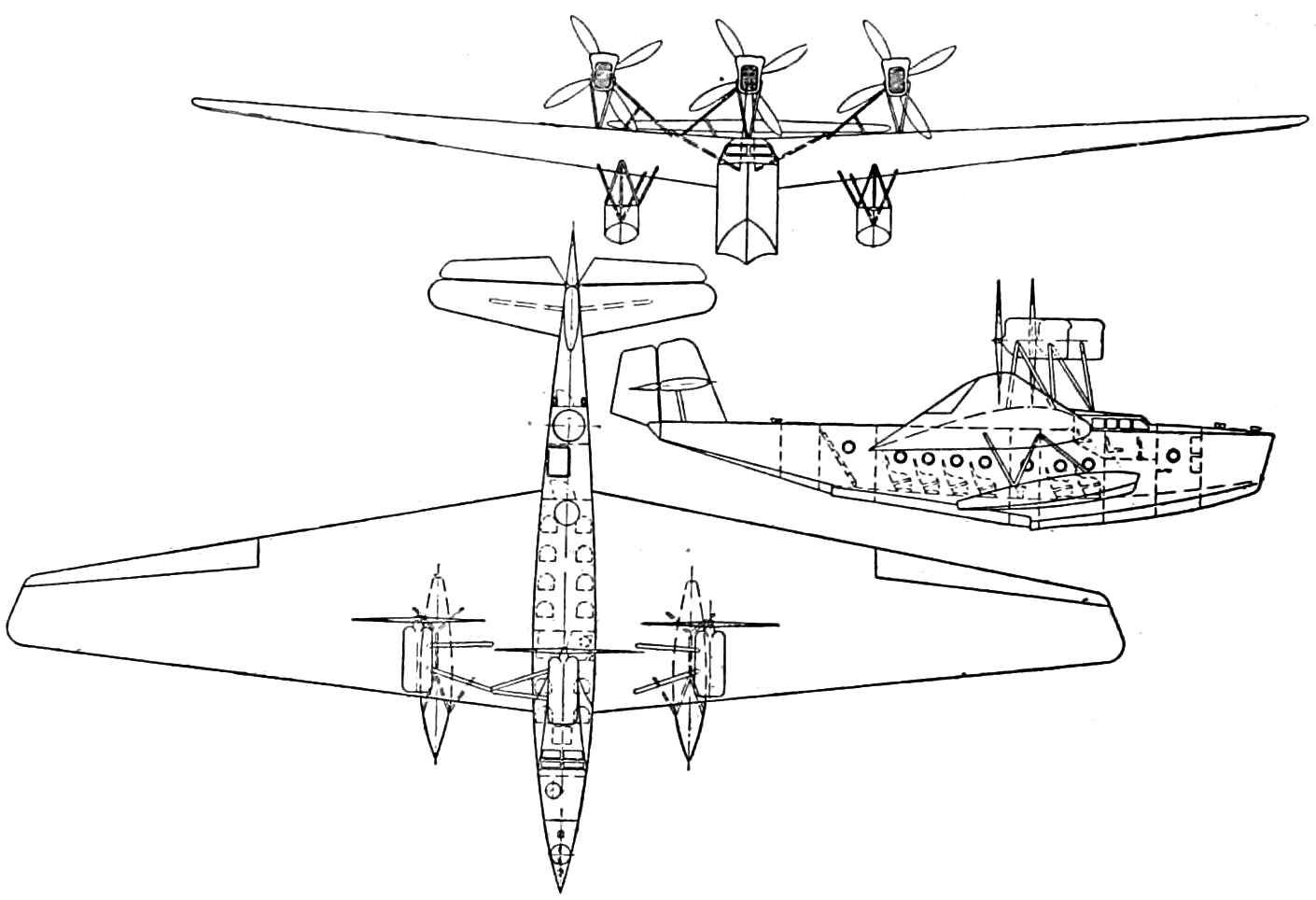
Rohrbach Romar 3-view drawing Aero Digest January 1929

Data from Jane's all the World's Aircraft 1928

General characteristics

- Crew: 4
- Capacity: 12 pax
- Length: 22 m (72 ft 2 in)
- Wingspan: 36.9 m (121 ft 1 in)
- Height: 8.3 m (27 ft 3 in)
- Wing area: 170 m^{2} (1,800 sq ft)
- Empty weight: 9,900 kg (21,826 lb)
- Gross weight: 19,000 kg (41,888 lb)
- Powerplant: 3 × BMW VI UZ V-12 water-cooled piston engines, 370 kW (500 hp) each -540 kW (720 hp)
- Propellers: 4-bladed fixed pitch pusher propellers

Performance

- Maximum speed: 217 km/h (135 mph, 117 kn) at 14,900 kg (32,800 lb); 208 km/h (129 mph; 112 kn) at 19,000 kg (42,000 lb)
- Cruise speed: 162 km/h (101 mph, 87 kn)
- Range: 4,000 km (2,500 mi, 2,200 nmi) with full fuel load
- Service ceiling: 4,550 m (14,930 ft) at 14,900 kg (32,800 lb); 2,800 m (9,200 ft) at 19,000 kg (42,000 lb)
- Time to altitude: 1,000 m (3,300 ft) in 4.4 minutes at 14,900 kg (32,800 lb); 1,000 m (3,300 ft) in 8.6 minutes at 19,000 kg (42,000 lb)
- Wing loading: 112 kg/m^{2} (23 lb/sq ft)
- Power/mass: 0.084 kW/kg (0.051 hp/lb)

== See also ==
Related lists

- List of flying boats and floatplanes
