= Rohrbach Metall-Flugzeugbau =

Defunct German aircraft manufacturing company

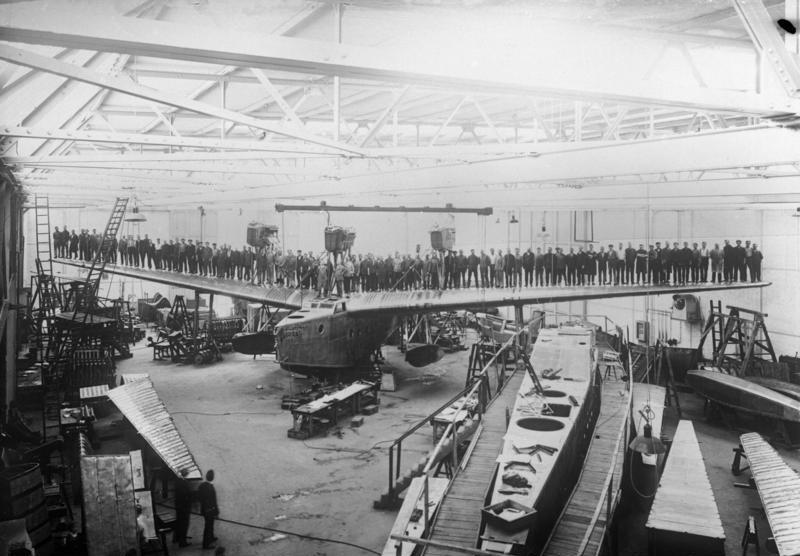
The strength of an aircraft wing being demonstrated in the Rohrbach factory

Rohrbach Metall-Flugzeugbau was an airplane factory located in Berlin, Germany and founded in 1922 by Dr.-Ing Adolf Rohrbach. Rohrbach was a pioneer in building airplanes based on the metal stressed skin principle.

At the time of the early aircraft production the Versailles Treaty forbade the construction and export of large aircraft in Germany, so Rohrbach set up a Danish company, the 'Rohrbach-Metall-Aeroplan Co. A/S', to build the early Rohrbach aircraft. The strict regulation of the aircraft industry was relaxed in 1926 allowing the Rohrbach series to be built at the Rohrbach Metall-Flugzeugbau GmbH factory in Berlin.

The company enjoyed only limited commercial success, with the Rohrbach Roland ten-seat airliner as its only model built in any quantity. By 1934 the company was taken over by Weser Flugzeugbau, where Adolf Rohrbach became technical director.

== Models ==
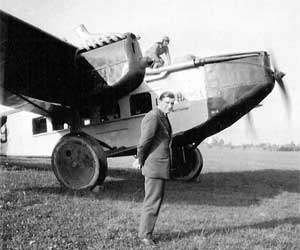
Rohrbach Ro-VIIIa Roland at Geneva-Cointrin airport (1929)

- Rohrbach Ro I
- Rohrbach Ro II 1923
- Rohrbach Ro III 1927
- Rohrbach Ro IIIa Rodra
- Rohrbach Ro IV 1925
- Rohrbach Ro V Rocco 1927
- Rohrbach Ro VI or the 'Beardmore Inflexible' 1928, one built in the UK by William Beardmore & Co
- Rohrbach Ro VII Robbe 1926
- Rohrbach Ro VIII Roland 1926
- Rohrbach Ro IX Rofix 1927
- Rohrbach Ro X Romar 1927
- Rohrbach Ro XI Rostra 1928
- Rohrbach Ro XII Roska project
- Rohrbach Roterra

== Bibliography ==
- Rohrbach
