= Rohrbach Ro V Rocco =

Ro V Rocco
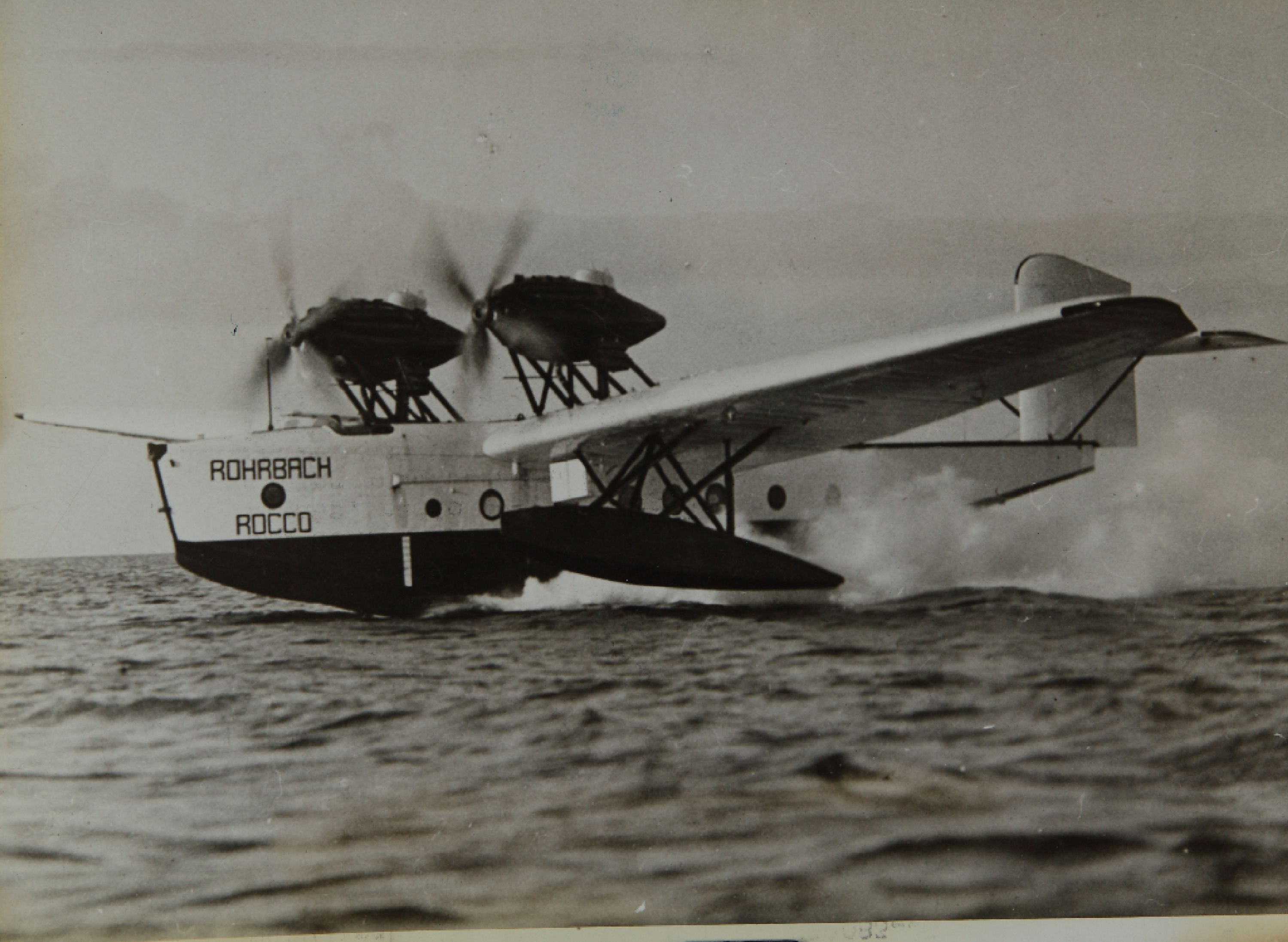

General information
- Type: Flying boat airliner
- Manufacturer: Rohrbach Metall-Flugzeugbau

The Rohrbach Ro V Rocco was a twin-engined seaplane that was designed and manufactured by the German aircraft manufacturer Rohrbach Metall-Flugzeugbau.

The Rocco was designed during the mid 1920s and only a single seaplane was produced, performing its maiden flight in 1927. It was delivered to Severa GmbH, where the Rocco undertook comparison flights against the Dornier Do J "Superwal" and as a seaplane trainer. During 1928, the Rocco was used on commercial flights by the German flag carrier Deutsche Luft Hansa, specifically the Travemünde to Oslo route.

== Design and development ==
It was designed by Dr.-Ing Adolf Rohrbach and largely conformed with the conventions practiced in his prior seaplane designs; however, the Rocco embodied several evolutionary features in its design, particularly in its wings. In contrast to Rohback’s earlier seaplanes, which had been furnished with wings that maintained a constant chord and section, the Rocco made use of tapered wing tips instead. Furthermore, a sizable dihedral angle was also present in order to accommodate the relatively high position of the engines. In terms of its general configuration, the Rocco had a monoplane wing that carried both of the seaplane’s engines in combination with a flat-sided and relatively narrow beam hull that was stabilised (when on the water) using a pair of outboard floats. It featured all-metal construction (akin to Rohback’s earlier seaplanes), the majority of which being composed of duralumin (exceptions include several fittings on the wing and bracing struts – which were composed of steel). The seaplane’s covering function as a stress-bearing element of the design, not only across the hull but also the wings.

The wings were covered with sheet duralumin, which formed part of the wing box. This wing box could be considered as being a single sizable spar that extended from between the two tip of the wing and roughly half-way in the wing chord up to a short distance to the aft of the leading edge, was built up in the form of a front and rear member that corresponded approximately to the front and rear spars used in more orthodox types of construction. These members were joined at intervals by fore and aft bulkheads or formers while the covering was riveted to both the spars and formers. Furthermore, the thickness of the skin varied across the wing in accordance to the localised stresses; these changes were effected partly by using sheet duralumin of different gauges and partly by lamination. Both the leading and trailing edges were hinged to the forward and rear spars at short intervals and were attached in such a manner that, after undoing several bolts, both the leading and trailing edges could be swung upwards or downwards to facilitate inspections of the interior of the wing box as well as minor repairs and draining out accumulated water.

The hull was flat-sided, which minimised the need (and thus expense) of panel beating the sheet material into the desired shape, which in this application would have typically required a double curvature. One exception was the form of the planing bottom of the hull, which had a pronounced V-shaped formation that sharply contrasted with the flat-bottomed hulls of the earlier Rohrbach seaplanes, which were reportedly prone to leakage after sustaining a series of hard landings. A twin-step hull was used, in common with the more capable seaplanes of the era. The construction of both the hull and the wings employed only flat sheet and open sections, which were relatively affordable to construct and easy to inspect. The manufacturer claimed that all riveting across the structure was open to inspection from both sides; furthermore, the use of open sections made the task of protecting the material against corrosion considerably easier.

Internally, the hull was divided by a series of bulkheads into water-tight compartments; every door in the cabin was also designed to be water-tight when closed. This measure reduced the risk of the seaplane sinking in the event of a single compartment sustaining damage. Rohrback claimed that the buoyancy of the hull was such that, if all of the doors and windows were closed, the seaplane would remain afloat even with two adjacent compartments were compromised. A similar principle applied to the outboard wing floats. Specifically, as a safeguard against the seaplane turning over in case of damage to one of the floats, the outer few feet of the wing itself were formed into water-tight boxes. In the event of the seaplane beginning to heel over, the wing tip would meet the water and the buoyancy of these wing tip boxes, effectively acting on a long lever arm, ought to prevent the seaplane from turning right over, although it would still lean over at a somewhat uncomfortable angle.

The nose of the hull formed a so-called "collision compartment" that protected the rest of the hull in the event of an obstacle being struck that resulted in a leak into the forward portion of the hull. It was separated from the rest of the hull by a water-tight bulkhead and stored apparatus such as anchor ropes, boat hooks, and drogues. Aft of the collision compartment was the cockpit, which featured two seats in a side by side arrangement along with suitable instrumentation and the flight controls. This cockpit was positioned ahead of the wings, thus enabling relatively favourable external visibility for the flight crew in virtually all directions, especially in light of the hull’s narrow beam. Directly behind the cockpit was the Wireless compartment, which was furnished with various radio apparatus, along with a table and seat, for the operator. This compartment also contained the auxiliary power unit, the arrangement of which was intended to minimise the noise generated by its operation via the use of a soundproof compartment. The auxiliary power unit was used to start the engines, drive the electrical generator and the bilge pumps.

Passengers would be accommodated with the saloon, which provided ample head room for standing upright throughout. A water-tight bulkhead divided the saloon into two separate compartments with a water-tight central door that permitted movement between the two when open. The forward compartment had sufficient accommodation for four passengers while the aft compartment could seat up to six. Entrance to the saloon was via a hatchway in the deck of the hull towards the aft end of the saloon. Various materials, including leather, covered the saloon; these were arranged so that they absorbed a considerable amount of the noise produced by the engines. The seats had adjustable backs and were claimed to be fairly comfortable. The saloon featured numerous round portholes that were, akin to the various doors and hatch covers, designed to be water-tight when closed. The saloon was well-ventilated and heated, every seat was provided with an electric light. Aft of the cabin is a lavatory and the luggage compartment, which could be accessed externally via a hatch in the deck and incorporated provisions to secure the luggage so that it did not shift around during the journey.

The Rocco was powered by a pair of Rolls-Royce Condor III V-12 engines, each one being capable of generating up to 650 HP. These engines were supported on tubular structures above the wing and were neatly cowled. It was claimed that the relatively high position of the engines kept the tractor airscrews well clear of any spray that might be thrown up by rough seas. A pair of oil tanks were located inside of the cowlings, just aft of the engines. Fuel was accommodated in tanks that formed the leading edge of the wing.

== Specifications ==
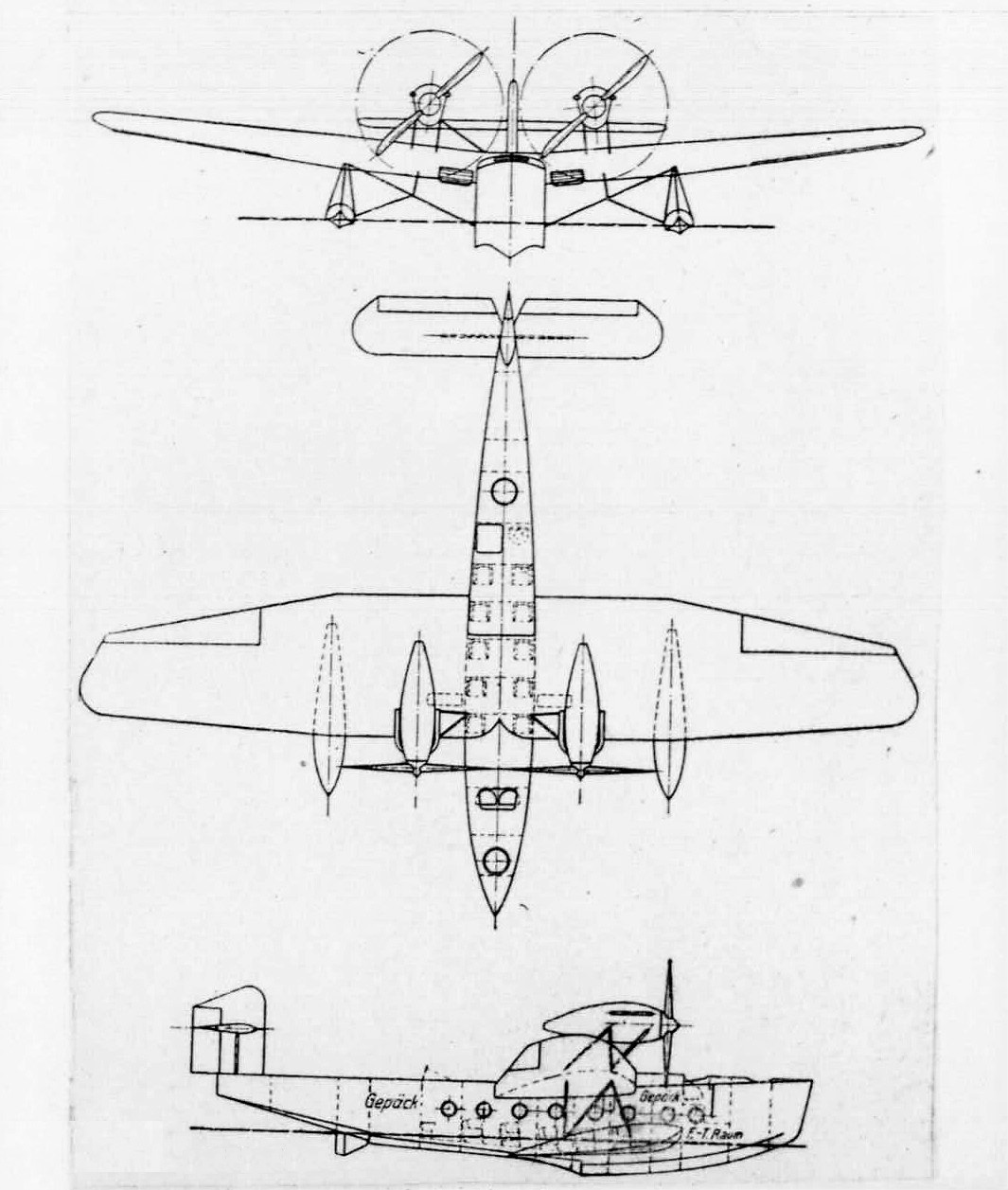
Rohrbach Ro V 3-view drawing from NACA Aircraft Circular No.44

Data from Rohrbach Ro V Rocco, Jane's all the World's Aircraft 1928

General characteristics

- Crew: three
- Capacity: 10 / 12 passengers
- Length: 19.3 m (63 ft 4 in)
- Wingspan: 25.9 m (85 ft 0 in)
- Height: 6.65 m (21 ft 10 in)
- Wing area: 94 m^{2} (1,010 sq ft)
- Empty weight: 6,850 kg (15,102 lb)
- Max takeoff weight: 9,710 kg (21,407 lb)
- Powerplant: 2 × Rolls-Royce Condor III V-12 water-cooled piston engines, 480 kW (650 hp) each
- Propellers: 4-bladed fixed pitch tractor propellers

Performance

- Maximum speed: 220 km/h (140 mph, 120 kn)
- Alighting speed: 115 km/h (71 mph; 62 kn)
- Cruise speed: 168 km/h (104 mph, 91 kn)
- Range: 1,500 km (930 mi, 810 nmi)
- Service ceiling: 2,900 m (9,500 ft) service ceiling; 3,150 m (10,330 ft) absolute ceiling
- Time to altitude: 1,000 m (3,300 ft) in 5.8 minutes; 2,000 m (6,600 ft) in 15.8 minutes
- Wing loading: 102 kg/m^{2} (21 lb/sq ft)
- Power/mass: 0.1008 kW/kg (0.0613 hp/lb)
