= Rohrbach Ro VII Robbe =

Robbe
- Robbe I at the seaplane trials in the Warnemünde

General information
- Type: Commercial transport or military reconnaissance aircraft
- National origin: Germany
- Manufacturer: Rohrbach Metall-Flugzeugbau
- Number built: 3

History
- First flight: 1925

The Rohrbach Ro VII Robbe (English: Seal) was an all-metal, twin engine flying boat built in Germany in the 1920s. It could be adapted to commercial or military rôles.

== Design and development ==
As the full company name (Rohrbach Metall-Flugzeugbau) makes clear, all Rohrbach aircraft were all-metal, including their duralumin skinning. The Robbe was a monoplane with a high wing described at the time as a semi-cantilever structure, meaning that there were no rigid wing struts but that it retained external bracing with flying wires to the wings from the lower fuselage. The wings were mounted with 5° of dihedral. In plan they were straight tapered, with unswept leading edges and blunt tips. Internally the wings were built around single box spars, assisted by leading edge and trailing edge boxes. The edge boxes also served as fuel tanks. At this time there were still doubts about the repairability of metal aircraft, so the Robbe's two-part wing was designed to be easy to inspect internally by the removal of the edge boxes and all parts were replaceable. The wing skin was riveted to the ribs.

The hull was flat-sided and deep. Its underside had two steps; in front of the first the hull bottom was a hollow V in section and behind it a flat V. There was a little water rudder behind the rear step. Pilot and mechanic sat side by side in an open cockpit, with gunner's positions ahead of them and at the trailing edge. Alternatively, the Robbe could be configured to carry four passengers, one in a forward cabin, two in a central one and one more in a rear cabin, or to carry goods or post. The hull was divided into seven watertight compartments to preserve buoyancy. An unusual feature of each gunner's cockpit was a duralumin, telescopic mast. If, in an emergency the Robbe alighted without power, these could each be extended and a simple, triangular sail raised to reach safety. At the rear the tail was conventional, with a blunted rectangular fin and small unbalanced rudder. The high aspect ratio horizontal tail, again rectangular apart from blunted tips, was mounted well up the fin and strut-braced to the upper fuselage. Like the rudder, the elevators were unbalanced.

To keep them clear of the spray of take-off, each of the Robbe's two 170 kW (230 hp) BMW IV water-cooled six cylinder upright inline engines was mounted in pusher configuration high above the wings on vertical faired steel tube N-form struts, the forward inner one particularly sturdy, and with transverse V-strut bracing with its apex on the central, upper fuselage. The engines were cooled with radiators in the front of the engine cowling and behind shutters controlled from the cockpit. There was a reserve fuel tank above each engine.

The Robbe had upward tilted, stabilizing, chined floats at about one third span, each mounted on N-form struts and transversely braced with converging struts to the wing below the engine mountings. Each float was divided into three watertight compartments.

== Operational history ==
The first flight of the Robbe I, as the model described above became known, was in 1925. By the following summer two had been built and were taking part in a seaplane contest on the Warnemünde, though they did not complete it.

In August 1926 the Robbe set at least four world speed records for aircraft carrying loads of 500 and 1,000 kg (1,100 and 2,200 lb) over distances of 100 and 500 km (62 and 311 mi); two of these remained unbroken well into 1927.

A Robbe participated in a competition for a seaworthy reconnaissance flying boat in the Netherlands from 18 October until 21 October. It did not earn a contract.

== Robbe II ==
Rorhbach built a third Ro VII, the Robbe II. Though the layout was the same as the Robbe I and some elements were common to both, the Robbe II was considerably larger and more powerful. It had a new, strongly straight tapered, wing with sweep only on the leading edge and a span of 21.5 m (70 ft 6 in). It was 15.2 m (49 ft 10 in) long and had a loaded weight of 5,050 kg (11,130 lb) in nine-seat passenger configuration. Pilot and mechanic had a low glazed enclosed cockpit ahead of the wing leading edge. Since the Robbe II was about 50% heavier than the earlier version it required more power. Construction began with the intention of fitting a pair of 260 kW (350 hp) BMW V water-cooled six-cylinder inline engines but when completed it had a pair of BMW VI V-12s, each developing 450–520 kW (600–700 hp).

It flew for the first time in the last quarter of 1927 in passenger configuration, with four porthole style windows in the cabin walls. Two military versions were proposed, a marine reconnaissance and anti-submarine aircraft and a conventional and torpedo bomber, both with three crew and machine guns or cannon; the loaded weight of the bomber was 5,550 kg (12,240 lb).

The Robbe II had a maximum speed of 220 km/h (140 mph) and alighted at 135 km/h (84 mph). Its range was about 17% lower and ceiling 5% lower than those of the earlier version.

== Variants ==
Ro VII Robbe I
First version, with 170 kW (230 hp) BMW IV 6-cylinder engines.
Ro VII Robbe II
Larger and heavier, with 450–520 kW (600–700 hp) BMW VI V-12 engines.

== Specifications (BMW IV engine) ==
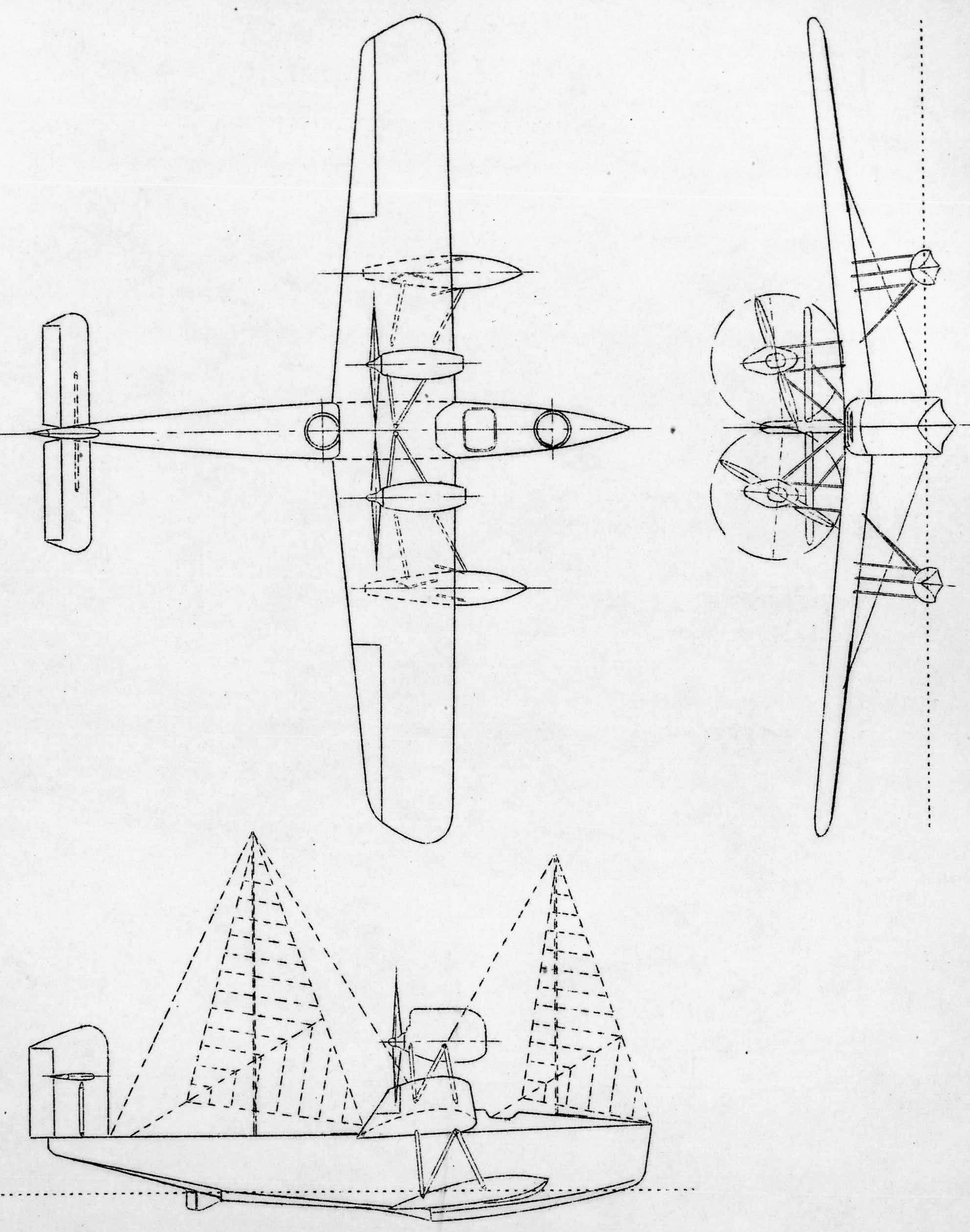
Rohrbach Ro.VII 3-view drawing from NACA Aircraft Circular No.36

Data from NACA Aircraft Circulars no.36, April 1927

General characteristics

- Crew: Two
- Capacity: Four passengers
- Length: 13.2 m (43 ft 4 in)
- Wingspan: 17.4 m (57 ft 1 in)
- Height: 5.5 m (18 ft 1 in) propellers running
- Wing area: 40 m^{2} (430 sq ft)
- Aspect ratio: 1:7.6
- Empty weight: 2,000 kg (4,409 lb)
- Gross weight: 3,360 kg (7,408 lb)
- Fuel capacity: 484 kg (1,067 lb)
- Powerplant: 2 × BMW IV water-cooled 6-cylinder inline engine, 170 kW (230 hp) each
- Propellers: 2-bladed

Performance

- Maximum speed: 210 km/h (130 mph, 110 kn) at 2,000 m (6,600 ft)
- Cruise speed: 150 km/h (93 mph, 81 kn)
- Range: 1,200 km (750 mi, 650 nmi) at 180 km/h (110 mph)
- Service ceiling: 4,500 m (14,800 ft) service
- Time to altitude: 16 min to 3,000 m (9,800 ft)
- Landing speed: 116 km/h (72 mph)
