= List of aircraft (R) =

This is a list of aircraft in alphabetical order beginning with 'R'.

== Ra ==
=== Ra-Son ===
- Ra-Son Warrior

=== Raab ===
(Fritz Raab)

- Raab Krähe
- Raab R2
- Raab Doppelraab
- Pützer Motorraab – built by Alfons Pützer

=== Raab ===
(Antonius Raab – Estonia)

- Raab Schwalbe
- Raab Schwalbe II

=== Raab-Katzenstein ===
(Raab-Katzenstein Flugzeugwerk GmbH (RaKa) – Antonius RAAB & Kurt KATZENSTEIN)

- Raab-Katzenstein KL.1 Schwalbe
- Raab-Katzenstein RK.2 Pelikan
- Raab-Katzenstein RK.6 Kranich – 2-seat biplane trainer, Mercedes (?), e.g. D-1061, '70, D-1152, '56
- Raab-Katzenstein RK.7 Schmetterling (Butterfly), parasol monoplane glider
- Raab-Katzenstein RK.8 Marabu
- Raab-Katzenstein RK.9 Grasmücke
- Raab-Katzenstein RK.22 (Opel-Raab-Katzenstein (RK 9 with solid-propellant Sander rocket)
- Raab-Katzenstein RK.25 (at least two – named Erka & Ruhrland)
- Raab-Katzenstein RK.25/32
- Raab-Katzenstein RK.26 Tigerschwalbe (Tiger Swallow[tail]), 2-seat biplane trainer
  - Raab-Katzenstein RK.26a
- Raab-Katzenstein RK.27 (blimp)
- Raab-Katzenstein RK.29
- Raab-Katzenstein RK.32
- ASJA Sk.10 Tigerschwalbe, rights acquired from Anatole Gobiet
- Pintsch Schwalbe II (RK-1 derivative))
- Pintsch TigerSchwalbe
- Rheinische FR-2 Schwalbe (RK-1 derivative))
- Raab-Katzenstein Bleriot XI replica
- Raab-Katzenstein F 1 Tigerschwalbe (production transition to Fieseler F 1)
- Pintsch TigerSchwalbe
- Fieseler Fi-1 D-1616/D-EVUK (W.Nr.103)

=== Raache ===
- Raache LR-1

=== Rabouyt ===
- Rabouyt D2

=== Raceair Designs ===
- Raceair Skylite
- Raceair Lil Bitts

=== Rackett ===
(William Rackett, Byron Center, MI)

- Rackett A

=== Rad Aviation ===
(Kidlington, United Kingdom)

- Rad Arrow
- Rad MXL
- Rad RXL
- Rad SXL Custom

=== Radioplane ===
(Reginald Denny Hobby Shops / Radioplane)

- Radioplane OQ-1
- Radioplane OQ-2
- Radioplane OQ-3
- Radioplane OQ-6
  - Radioplane OQ-6A
- Radioplane OQ-7
- Radioplane OQ-13
- Radioplane OQ-14
- Radioplane OQ-19
- Radioplane Q-1
- Radioplane Q-3
- Radioplane Q-4
- Radioplane RP-1
- Radioplane RP-2
- Radioplane RP-3
- Radioplane RP-4
- Radioplane RP-5
- Radioplane RP-14
- Radioplane RP-15
- Radioplane RP-61
- Radioplane RP-70
- Radioplane RP-71 Falconer
- Radioplane RP-76
- Radioplane RP-77
- Radioplane RP-78
- Radioplane RP-86
- Radioplane Dennymite
- Radioplane XKD4R
- Radioplane MQM-33
- Radioplane AQM-35
- Radioplane MQM-36 Shelduck
- Radioplane AQM-38
- Radioplane MQM-57 Falconer
- Radioplane KD2R Quail
- Radioplane BTT
- Radioplane TDD-1, target (1939)

=== RAE ===
(Aero Club of the Royal aircraft Establishment)

- RAE Zephyr
- RAE Scarab
- RAE Hurricane

=== Rafaelyants ===
- Rafaelyants PR-5
- Rafaelyants PR-12
- Rafaelyants RAF-1
- Rafaelyants RAF-2
- Rafaelyants RAF-11
- Rafaelyants RAF-11bis
- Rafaelyants Turbolyet
- Rafaelyants izdeliye O

=== Ragot ===
(Henri & Louis Ragot, Adrien Lacroix, New York NY.)

- Ragot 1911 Monoplane

=== RagWing ===
- RagWing RW1 Ultra-Piet
- RagWing RW2 Special I
- RagWing RW4 Midwing Sport
- RagWing RW5 Heath Replica
- RagWing RW6 Rag-A-Muffin
- RagWing RW7 Duster
- RagWing RW8 PT2S
- RagWing RW9 Motor Bipe
- RagWing RW11 Rag-A-Bond
- RagWing RW16 Aerial
- RagWing RW19 Stork
- RagWing RW20 Stork side-by-side
- RagWing RW22 Tiger Moth
- RagWing RW26 Special II

=== Rahn ===
(Rahn Aircraft Corp, Brooklyn NY.)

- Rahn 1935 rotary wing

=== Raiche ===
(François & Bessica Raiche, Mineola NY.)

- Raiche 1910 Biplane

=== Rainbow ===
(Rainbow Aircraft, Edenvale, Gauteng, South Africa)

- Rainbow Aerotrike Cobra
- Rainbow Aerotrike Safari
- Rainbow Aerotrike Scout
- Rainbow Aerotrike Spirit
- Rainbow Cheetah
- Rainbow Cheetah XLS
- Rainbow Skyreach Bush Cat

=== Raisner Aircraft Depot ===
(Part of Leading Edge Air Foils, Peyton Colorado)

- Raisner Graffiti

=== Raj Hamsa ===
- Raj Hamsa X-Air S (Standard)
- Raj Hamsa X-Air F Gumnam
- Raj Hamsa X-Air H Hanuman

=== Ralph ===
(Paul F. Ralph)

- Ralph Santa Ana

=== Ramor ===
(Ramor Flugzeugbau / Albert Kalkert)

- Ramor K.E. 14

=== Ramphos ===
(Ramphos Inc, Fontanafredda, Italy)

- Ramphos C
- Ramphos Hydro
- Ramphos Trident

=== Ramsey ===
(W H Ramsey, Minneapolis MN.)

- Ramsey Flying Bath Tub

=== Rand-Robinson ===
(Rand-Robinson Engineering Inc, Huntington Beach CA.)

- Rand Robinson KR-1
- Rand Robinson KR-1A
- Rand Robinson KR-2
- Rand Robinson KR-3

=== Ranger ===
(Glenn Wade & Harmon Gum, Long Beach CA.)

- Ranger M-1

=== Ranger ===
(Ranger Aircraft Corp, Oklahoma City)

- Ranger 1929 Monoplane
- Ranger C-1 a.k.a. Hunt Racer
- Ranger Cadet
- Ranger SR-3-1
- Ranger Trainer
- Ranger W

=== Rankin ===
((John G "Tex") Rankin School of Flying/Rankin System; Portland OR.)

- Rankin EX-1
- Rankin RBM-4

=== Rans ===
- Rans S-4 Coyote
- Rans S-5 Coyote
- Rans S-6 Coyote II
- Rans S-7 Courier
- Rans S-9 Chaos
- Rans S-10 Sakota
- Rans S-11 Pursuit
- Rans S-12 Airaile
- Rans S-14 Airaile
- Rans S-16 Shekari
- Rans S-17 Stinger
- Rans S-18
- Rans S-19 Venterra
- Rans S-20 Raven
- Rans S-21 Outbound

=== Rasmussen ===
(Hans L Rasmussen, Niles MI.)

- Rasmussen Skippy

=== Rathel ===
((Fred) Rathel Motor Co, Daleville or Farmland or Portland IL.)

- Rathel 1930 Monoplane

=== Rausch ===
(Rausch Engineering Inc, South San Francisco CA.)

- Rausch Star 250

=== Raven ===
(Raven Aircraft Corporation, Surrey, British Columbia, Canada)

- Raven 2XS

=== Raven ===
(Raven Rotorcraft)

- Raven Explorer I
- Raven Explorer II
- Raven Rotor-Plane

=== Ravin Aircraft ===
(SA Ravin Aircraft, Pretoria, South Africa)

- Ravin 500
- Ravin 700

=== Rawdon ===
((Alanson "Dutch," Gene, Herb) Rawdon Bros Aircraft Co, Wichita)

- Rawdon R-1
- Rawdon T-1

=== Rayner ===
(Herb Rayner)

- Rayner Pusher

=== Raytheon ===
- Raytheon 390 Premier I
- Raytheon Sentinel
- Raytheon Beechcraft 1900
- Raytheon Beechcraft Baron
- Raytheon Beechcraft Bonanza
- Raytheon Beechcraft King Air
- Raytheon Beech T-6 Texan II
- Raytheon Beechjet 400
- Raytheon Hawker 400XP (Raytheon Beechjet 400)
- Raytheon Hawker 800
- Raytheon Hawker 1000
- Raytheon Hawker 4000
- Raytheon AQM-37 Jayhawk
- Raytheon CT-156 Harvard II Canadian Armed Forces

=== RBVZ ===
(RBVZ Russko-Baltiisky Vagon Zavod – Russo-Baltic wagon works)

- RBVZ S-6
- RBVZ S-7
- RBVZ S-8 Malyutka
- RBVZ S-9 Kruglyi
- RBVZ S-10
- RBVZ S-11
- RBVZ S-12
- RBVZ S-XVI
- RBVZ S-XVII
- RBVZ S-XVIII
- RBVZ S-XIX
- RBVZ S-XX
- RBVZ S-22
- RBVZ S-23
- RBVZ S-24
- RBVZ S-25
- RBVZ S-26
- RBVZ S-27
- RBVZ Alexander Nevsky (1916 replacement for the IM)
- RBVZ Ilya Muromets
- RBVZ le Grand
- RBVZ Bolshoi Baltiiski
- RBVZ Russky Vityaz

=== RDD Enterprises ===
- RDD Enterprises LX7

=== Reaction Engines ===
- Reaction Engines A2

=== Read ===
(David B Read, Oshkosh WI.)

- Read S-4

=== Read ===
(George Read Jr, St Petersburg FL.)

- Read Tweety Bird

=== Reality ===
- Reality Easy Raider
- Just Escapade

=== Rearwin ===
(Rearwin Aircraft & Engines Inc.)

- Rearwin Ken-Royce
- Rearwin Junior 3000
- Rearwin Junior 4000
- Rearwin Speedster 6000
- Rearwin Sportster 7000
- Rearwin Cloudster 8000
- Rearwin Sportster 8500
- Rearwin Sportster 9000
- Rearwin C-102
- Rearwin 175 Skyranger

=== Reaver ===
(J P Reaver / Nicholas-Beazley Airplane Co, Marshal MO.)

- Reaver Special

=== Reberry ===
(Brian Reberry)

- Reberry 3M1C1R

=== Red Ball ===
(Ward D Hiner, Fort Wayne IN.)

- Red Ball A
- Red Ball 1928 Biplane

=== Red Bird ===
(Red Bird Aircraft Co (pres: Harry Frey), Bern KS; Oklahoma City OK.)

- Red Bird 1928 Biplane

=== Red Wing ===
(Red Wing Airplane Club, Cicero IL.)

- Red Wing Trainer

=== Redback Aviation ===
(Hoppers Crossing, Victoria, Australia)

- Redback Buzzard
- Redback Aviation Spider

=== Redfern ===
(Walter "Wimpy" W. Redfern, Post Falls, Idaho, United States)

- Redfern DH-2
- Redfern Fokker Dr.1
- Redfern Nieuport 17/24

=== Reece ===
(Paul Reece, Brownstown IL.)

- Reece Rocket

=== Reedholm ===
(Wilmer A Reedholm, Lanyon IA.)

- Reedholm 1926 Monoplane

=== Reflex Fiberglass Works ===
(Walterboro, South Carolina, United States)

- Reflex White Lightning
- Reflex Lightning Bug

=== Reflex Paramoteur ===
(Chatou, France)

- Reflex Classic
- Reflex Bi Trike
- Reflex Dynamic
- Reflex J 160
- Reflex J 320
- Reflex S
- Reflex Solo Elec
- Reflex Top Box

=== Regent ===
(Regent Aircraft Sales Corp (Pirtle Aircraft Co), Henderson TX.)

- Regent Rocket
- Regent Rocket 185
- Regent Texas Bullet

=== REGENT ===
(Regent Craft Inc., North Kingstown RI.)

- REGENT Viceroy

=== Reggiane ===
(Officine Meccaniche "Reggiane" S.A.)

- Reggiane Re.2000 Falco
- Reggiane Re.2001 Falco II
- Reggiane Re.2002 Ariete
- Reggiane Re.2003
- Reggiane Re.2004
- Reggiane Re.2005 Bifusoliera
- Reggiane Re.2005 Sagittario
- Reggiane Re.2006
- Reggiane Re.2007
- Reggiane Re.2008

=== Régnier ===
(Carlos Régnier)

- Régnier 12

=== Reid ===
(Donald (or Walter) E Reid, Ashbury Park NJ.)

- Reid Rambler

=== Reid ===
(W T Reid Aircraft Co, Montreal Canada.)

- Reid RFS Commander a.k.a. Reid Flying Submarine

=== Reid and Sigrist ===
- R.S.1 (unofficially (?) the "Snargasher")
- R.S.3 Desford
- R.S.4 Bobsleigh

=== Reims Aviation ===
- Reims F150
- Reims F152
- Reims F172
- Reims F177
- Reims F182
- Reims F337
- Reims-Cessna F406
- Reims RA 110

=== Reissner ===
(Prof. Hans Reissner)

- Reissner Ente

=== Remos ===
(Remos Aircraft Company GmbH,)

- Remos GX
- Remos G3 Mirage
- Remos G3 Mirage S
- Remos G3 Mirage RS
- Remos G3 Mirage RS/L
- Remos G3 Mirage ARF
- Remos G3/600
- Remos G3 RaLi
- Remos GX eLite

=== RemSchetMash ===
- RemSchetMash Robust

=== Renard ===
(Société Anonyme de Avions et Moteurs Renard / Alfred Renard)

- Renard Epervier

=== Renard ===
(Constructions Aéronautiques G. Renard / Georges Renard)

- Renard 16/100
- Renard R.17 100 hp Renard engine
- Renard R.18 Similar to the RSV.18-100, a single engine monoplane two seater with a 100 hp Renard engine.
- Renard R.30
- Renard R.31
- Renard R.32
- Renard R.33
- Renard R.34
- Renard R.35
- Renard R.36
- Renard R.37
- Renard R.37B Low-wing monoplane fighter; a separate project saw the design for the R.37B 14N two-seat attack variant.
- Renard R.38
- Renard R.40
- Renard R.42
- Renard R.44
- Renard R.46

=== Renaudeau ===
- Renaudeau Avia Sport

=== Renault ===
(Société des Moteurs Renault-Aviation)

- Renault O1

=== Renegade ===
(Renegade Light Sport)

- Renegade Falcon LS
- Renegade Falcon LS 2.0
- Renegade Falcon T

=== REP ===
(Établissements D'aviation Robert-Esnault-Pelterie)

- R.E.P. 1904 glider (1)
- R.E.P. 1904 glider (2)
- R.E.P. 1
- R.E.P. 2
- R.E.P. 2 bis
- R.E.P. B
- R.E.P. D
- R.E.P. E-80
- R.E.P. F
- R.E.P. I-80
- R.E.P. K
- R.E.P. K-80
- R.E.P. N
- R.E.P. triplace militaire
- R.E.P. 1911 Monoplan de Course (Circuit Européen)
- R.E.P. 1911 Biplane
- R.E.P. 1912 Hydro (K on floats)
- R.E.P. Vision Totale
- R.E.P. Parasol single-seater
- R.E.P. Parasol two-seater
- R.E.P. C1

=== Replica Plans ===
- Replica Plans SE.5a

=== Replogle ===
(Ralph Replogle, Camden IN.)

- Replogle 1930 Monoplane

=== Replogle ===
(Merle Replogle, Osceola IN.)

- Replogle Gold Bug
- Replogle Golden Bullet GB-1

=== Replogle ===
(E H Replogle)

- Replogle REP-2

=== Reppert ===
(Merle Reppert, Torrance CA.)

- Reppert T-Aero

=== Republic ===
- Republic AP-4
- Republic AP-9
- Republic AP-10 P-47
- Republic AP-12 initial design for the XP-69
- Republic AP-16B F-47N version of P-47
- Republic AP-18 improved XP-69
- Republic AP-19 XP-72
- Republic AP-22 JB-2 Loon
- Republic AP-23 F-84
- Republic AP-23M final design for F-84F; became the YF-96
- Republic AP-23X initial design for F-84F; not accepted by the USAF
- Republic AP-24 RC-3
- Republic AP-31 XF-91
- Republic AP-41 initial design for XF-12
- Republic AP-42 heavy bomber for USAF; follow-up/replacement for B-47
- Republic AP-43 P-43
- Republic AP-44A XF-103
- Republic AP-46 XF-84H
- Republic AP-47 mixed-power ground attack version of the P-47
- Republic AP-54 single-engine, swept-wing all-weather interceptor; "1954 Interceptor" (MX1554) submission
- Republic AP-55 twin-boom, inverted V-tail lightweight fighter/interceptor
- Republic AP-57 "1954 Interceptor" proposal; became the XF-103
- Republic AP-60 turboprop bomber based on XF-12
- Republic AP-63 F-105
- Republic AP-71 RF-105B, RF-105C
- Republic AP-75 long-range interceptor to WS-202A
- Republic AP-76
- Republic AP-85 two-seat swept-wing version of F-84F
- Republic AP-90
- Republic AP-95 ASM ballistic missile to fit inside F-105 weapons bay
- Republic AP-96 man in space vehicle
- Republic AP-100 V/STOL fighter-bomber
- Republic EP-106
- Republic NP-48 US Navy interceptor proposal based on XF-91; probably to OS-113
- Republic NP-49 US Navy interceptor proposals with V-tail and underwing engines; probably to OS-113
- Republic NP-50 US Navy bomber to OS-111; lost to Douglas A3D
- Republic NP-52 twin-engine ASW aircraft
- Fairchild-Republic A-10 Thunderbolt II
- Fokker/Republic D-24 Alliance
- Republic AT-12 Guardsman
- Republic F-84 Thunderjet
- Republic F-84F Thunderstreak
  - Republic RF-84F Thunderflash
  - Republic F-96 Thunderstreak; swept wing version of the F-84, evolved into the F-84F
- Republic F-105 Thunderchief
- Republic OA-15
- Republic P-43 Lancer
- Republic P-44 Rocket proposed version of P-43 with a Pratt & Whitney R-2180 Twin Hornet engine
- Republic P-47 Thunderbolt
- Republic 2-PA Guardsman
- Republic RC-1 Thunderbolt Amphibian
- Republic RC-2 Rainbow
- Republic RC-3 Seabee
- Republic XF-12 Rainbow (also known as XR-12)
- Republic XF-84H Thunderscreech
- Republic XF-91 Thunderceptor (initially XP-91)
- Republic XF-103
- Republic XF-106 Thunderscreech; initial designation of the XF-84F
- Republic XP-69
- Republic XP-72
- Republic-Ford JB-2 Loon (US built V-1)
- Republic Lark

=== Repülőgépgyár ===
- Repülőgépgyár Levente

=== Retz ===
((Robert E) Retz Aero Shop, Farmland IN.)

- Retz R-1
- Retz R-2
- Retz R-3
- Retz R-4
- Retz R-5
- Retz R-10

=== Revolution ===
(Revolution Helicopter Corp Inc (pres: Dennis Fetters), Excelsior Springs MO.)

- Revolution Mini-500

=== Rex ===
(Rex Monoplane Co, South Beach, Staten Island NY.)

- Rex 1912 Monoplane

=== Rex ===
(Flugmaschine Rex G.m.b.H.)

- Rex single seat Scout 1915
- Rex single seat Scout 1916
- Rex single seat Scout 1917

=== Rex Smith Aeroplane Company ===
- Rex Smith Biplane

=== Rey ===
- Rey R.1

== Rh ==
=== Rheden ===
(Cuno Rheden, Chicago IL.)

- Rheden 1922 Monoplane

=== RFB ===
(Rhein Flugzeugbau GmbH)

- Rhein Flugzeugbau RW 3 Multoplan
- RFB/Grumman American Fanliner
- RFB Fantrainer
- RFB X-114
- RFB X-117
- RFB RF-1 V1
- RFB RF-1 V2
- RFB Sirius II
- Rockwell/MBB Fan Ranger

=== Rhein-West-Flug Fischer ===
(Germany)

- RWF Fibo 2a
- RW 3A Multoplan

=== Rheinland ===
(Fliegerschule Rheinland)

- Rheinland FR-2 Schwalbe

=== Rhoades ===
(Charles Rhoades, Lock Haven PA)

- Rhoades Twin Piper

=== Rhodes Berry ===
(Rhodes Berry Co, Los Angeles CA.)

- Rhodes Berry Silver Sixty

== Ri ==
=== Ricci ===
(Umberto Ricci & Ettore Ricci)

- Ricci 1912 triple-tandem hydroplane
- Ricci R-1 1. pontoons with open girder tail supports, 2. full length hulls
- Ricci R-2
- Ricci R-3 project
- Ricci R-4 project
- Ricci R-5 built by Officine E. Cantieri Montofano in 1923 (JAWA 1923)
- Ricci R-6
- Ricci R-7
- Ricci R-9
- Ricci R.I.B
- Ricci-Vaugean-Gargiulo A.V.3 airship

=== Rice ===
(James L Rice, Van Wert OH.)

- Rice Special

=== Rich ===
((Nelson B) Rich Airplane Co, Springfield MA.)

- Rich-Twin 1-X-A

=== Richard ===
(C H Richard Co, Lancaster CA.)

- Richard 125 Commuter
- Richard 150 Commuter
- Richard 190 Sportplane

=== Richard ===
- Richard TOM-1

=== Richard-Penhoët ===
- Richard-Penhoët 2

=== Richardson ===
(H C Richardson, Othello WA.)

- Richardson 1909 Biplane

=== Richardson ===
(Archibald and Mervyn, Sydney Australia)

- Richardson 1914 monoplane

=== Richardson ===
(B E Richardson, Grand Rapidw MI.)

- Richardson 1911 Monoplane

=== Richardson ===
((A S) Richardson Aeroplane Corp Inc, Lowell MA)

- Richardson N-1

=== Richmond ===
(Richmond Airways Inc, Greenridge (Staten Island) NY.)

- Richmond Sea Hawk

=== Richmond ===
- See Hudson & O'Brien

=== Richter ===
(George Richter, Ric-Jet Systems Research & Development, Los Angeles CA.)

- Richter Ric Jet 4

=== Richter ===
(Klaus J. Richter Ingenieurbüro)

- DeRic DE 13P Delta-Ente

=== Rickman ===
(New York NY.)

- Rickman 1909 man-powered umbrella wing

=== RIDA ===
- RIDA Aleks 251
- RIDA 256

=== Rider ===
(Keith Rider, San Francisco CA)

- Rider B-1
- Rider R-1
- Rider R-2
- Rider R-3
- Rider R-4
- Rider R-5
- Rider R-6

=== Rieseler ===
- Rieseler R.I Sportflugzeug Parasol
- Rieseler R.II Sportflugzeug Parasol
- Rieseler R.III

=== Rieseler ===
(Walter Rieseler at Berlin-Johannistal)

- Rieseler R.I helicopter
- Rieseler R.II helicopter

=== Rietti ===
(Ariel Ciro Rietti)

- Rietti Golondrina V

=== Rigault ===
(Paul Rigault)

- Rigault RP.01A
- Rigault RP.01B

=== Rigault-Deproux ===
(Maurice & Paul rigault & Jacques Deproux)

- Rigault-Deproux RD.01
- Rigault-Deproux RD.02
- Rigault-Deproux RD.03

=== Righton ===
(Douglas Huntly Righton)

- Righton Big Wing

=== Riggs-Weeks ===
(Eugene Augustus "Gus" Riggs, Terre Haute IN; 1913: add Lloyd Wehr; c.1913: add Elling O Weeks.)

- Riggs 1912 Biplane
- Riggs-Weeks 1913 Biplane
- Riggs-Wehr 1915 Biplane

=== Rihn Aircraft ===
(Dan Rihn, United States)

- Rihn DR-107 One Design
- Rihn DR-109

=== Rikugun ===
- Rikugun Ki-93

=== Riley ===
(Theron G Riley (aero engr), 923-925 Mary St, Flint MI.)

- Riley Special

=== Riley ===
(Riley Aeronautics Corp, Ft Lauderdale FL.)

- Riley 55 Twin Navion (Temco D-16, not the Camair Twin Navion)
- Riley 65
- Riley 310R
- Riley Jet Prop 340
- Riley Jet Prop 421
- Riley Rocket
- Riley Rocket 340
- Riley Rocket 414
- Riley Super 310
- Riley Super 340
- Riley Turbine Eagle 421
- Riley Turbine P-210
- Riley Turbo-Exec 400
- Riley Turbo-Executive
- Riley Dove 400
- Riley Turbo Skyliner
- Riley Turbostream

=== Rinehart-Whelan ===
((Howard) Rinehart-(B L) Whelan Co, South Field, Dayton OH.)

- Rinehart-Whelan 1930 Monoplane
- Rinehart-Whelan KAT
- Rinehart-Whelan Rambler a.k.a. Chummy
- Rinehart-Whelan Wren

=== Rinek ===
((Charles Norvin) Rinek Mfg Co, Easton PA.)

- Rinek Voisin

=== Rioux ===
(René Riout)

- Riout 102T Alérion – Ornithopter

=== Rippert ===
- Rippert AI-65

=== Riter ===
((Russell) Riter Engineering Corp, Deerfield IL.)

- Riter Special

=== Ritter ===
- Ritter Special

=== Ritz ===
- Ritz Model A

=== Riverside (aircraft constructor) ===
(Riverside CA.)

- Riverside Penguin

=== Rize ===
- Rize YS-01

== RL ==
=== RLU Aircraft ===
(Charles Roloff, Robert Liposky and Carl Unger)

- RLU-1 Breezy

== RM ==
=== RMC ===
(Rene M. coutant)

- RMC Type 17

=== RMT Aviation ===
(Bad Bocklet, Germany)

- RMT Bateleur

== Ro ==
=== RoamAIR ===
(RoamAIRcraft Corp.)

- RoamAIR WO-29 Sport

=== Robbins ===
(Samuel B Robbins, Boise City OK.)

- Robbins Silver Wing

=== Robbins ===
(Reggie Robbins, Dallas TX.)

- Robbins Special

=== Roberts Aircraft ===
(Roberts Aircraft Corp, Phoenix AZ.)

- Roberts Sparrowhawk

=== Roberts ===
(Don Roberts, Noblesville IN.)

- Roberts Chinese Bandit

=== Roberts ===
(Roberts Sport Aircraft, Yakima WA.)

- Roberts Sceptre I
- Roberts Sceptre II

=== Robertson ===
(Robertson Aircraft Corp, Lambert Field, St Louis MO.)

- Robertson B1-RD
- Robertson RO-154 Rovair

=== Robertson ===
((James L) Robertson Development Co, Fort Worth TX. / (James L) Robertson Aircraft Corp, Renton WA.)

- Robertson Skylark SRX-1
- Robertson Skyshark

=== Robey ===
(J L Robey, Detroit MI.)

- Robey Speed Aire

=== Robey ===
- Robey-Peters Gun-Carrier

=== Robin ===
- Robin ATL
- Robin HR.100
- Robin HR.100 Royal
- Robin HR.100/180
- Robin HR.100/200B Royal
- Robin HR.100/210 Safari
- Robin HR.100/235TR
- Robin HR.100/250TR
- Robin HR.100/285TR Tiara
- Robin HR.100/320 4+2
- Robin DR.100
- Robin DR.200
- Robin DR.220 2+2
- Robin DR.221 Dauphin
- Robin DR.250 Capitaine
- Robin DR.250-180
- Robin DR.253 Regent
- Robin DR.300
- Robin DR.315 Petit Prince
- Robin DR.330
- Robin DR.340 Major
- Robin DR.360 Chevalier
- Robin DR.400
- Robin DR.500 Président
- Robin R.1180 Aiglon
- Robin R.2000
- Robin R.2100A
- Robin R.2112 Alpha
- Robin R.2160 Alpha Sport
- Robin R.2160 Acrobin
- Robin R.3000
- Robin R.3100
- Robin R.3120
- Robin R.3140
- Robin R.3160
- Robin R.3180
- Robin X4

=== Robinson ===
(Hugh Robinson, Joplin and St Louis MO.)

- Robinson 1908 Monoplane
- Robinson 1915 Biplane
- Robinson R-13

=== Robinson ===
(Arthur J Robinson, Sheridan WY.)

- Robinson 1909 Monoplane

=== Robinson ===
(William C "Billy" Robinson, Grinnell IA.)

- Robinson 1913 Monoplane
- Robinson 1915 Biplane

=== Robinson ===
(Miami Aircraft Co (fdr: S D Robinson), RFD 2, Miami OK.)

- Robinson Special A-1

=== Robinson ===
(James T Robinson, Los Angeles., RFD 2, Miami OK.)

- Robinson Sailaire

=== Robinson ===
(William F "Billie" Robinson, Burbank CA.)

- Robinson Banger Bill

=== Robinson ===
(M D Robinson, High Point NC.)

- Robinson MDR-1 Special

=== Robinson ===
(Cleo Robinson, Phillipsburg KS.)

- Robinson Mere Merit

=== Robinson ===
(Robinson Helicopter Co. (fdr: Frank D. Robinson), Torrance CA.)

- Robinson R22
- Robinson R44 & R44 Raven I/II
- Robinson R66

=== Robinson Aircraft Co ===
- Robinson Redwing

=== Robinson-Christensen-Wright ===
(James Robinson & Earle Christensen & Leslie Wright, Los Angeles CA.)

- Robinson-Christensen-Wright Firefly

=== Roche ===
- Guerchais-Roche T.35

=== Roché-Dohse ===
((Jean A) Roché-(John Quintin) Dohse, 28 Watts St, Dayton OH.)

- Roché-Dohse Flying Flivver

=== Rocheville ===
((Charles & Harry) Rocheville Aircraft Corp Ltd/Rocheville Ltd, 3510 Percy St, Los Angeles CA.)

- Rocheville 1923 Monoplane
- Rocheville 1927 Monoplane
- Rocheville Special
- Rocheville A
- Rocheville Arctic Tern
- Rocheville Flying Wing
- Rocheville R-2
- Rocheville VC-2 a.k.a. VCM-1

=== Rock Island ===
(Aviation Div, Rock Island Oil & Refining Co Inc, Hutchinson KS)

- Rock Island Monarch 26

=== Rocket ===
(Rocket Aircraft Corporation)

- Rocket 185

=== Rocket Racing League ===
- RRL Mark-I X-Racer
- RRL Mark-II X-Racer
- RRL Mark-III X-racer

=== Rocketplane Limited, Inc. ===
- Rocketplane XP

=== Rockwell ===
- Rockwell 100
- Rockwell 500
- Rockwell 520
- Rockwell 560
- Rockwell 680
- Rockwell 685
- Rockwell 700
- Rockwell 710
- Rockwell 720
- Rockwell 840
- Rockwell 980
- Rockwell 1000
- Rockwell Commander 111
- Rockwell Commander 112
- Rockwell Commander 114
- Rockwell Commander 212
- Rockwell Courser Commander
- Rockwell Hawk Commander
- Rockwell Turbo Commander
- Rockwell NR-349
- Rockwell Ranger 2000
- Rockwell Sabreliner
- Rockwell Space Shuttle
- Rockwell Thrush Commander
- Rockwell B-1 Lancer
- Rockwell T-2 Buckeye
- Rockwell V-10 Bronco
- Rockwell FV-12A
- Rockwell X-30 NASP
- Rockwell-MBB X-31
- Rockwell/MBB Fan Ranger
- Rockwell HiMAT

=== Rocky Mountain Wings ===
- Rocky Mountain Wings Ridge Runner

=== Roe ===
- Roe I Biplane
- Roe I Triplane
- Roe II Triplane
- Roe III Triplane
- Roe IV Triplane
- Roe-Duigan 1911
- Roe Type D
- Roe Type E
- Roe Type F
- Roe Type G
- Roe-Burga monoplane

=== Roehrig ===
(B F Roehrig, San Diego CA.)

- Roehrig 1910 Biplane

=== Roepkin ===
(Casten A Roepkin, Dayton OH.)

- Roepkin 1928 Monoplane

=== Roesgen ===
(Emile Roesgen possibly also Rösgen)

- Roesgen EPR-301

=== Rogalski and Wigura ===
- Rogalski and Wigura R.W.1

=== Rogers ===
(Hyattsville MD.)

- Rogers 1910 Monoplane

=== Rogers ===
((John W) Rogers Aircraft Corp, Los Angeles CA.)

- Rogers A-1
- Rogers C-1
- Rogers Monoplane

=== Rogers ===
(Rogers Aeronautical Mfg Co, Roosevelt Field, Long Island NY.)

- Rogers Sea Eagle RBX
- Rogers Sea Hawk

=== Rogers Aircraft ===
(Riverside, California, United States)

- Rogers Sportaire

=== Rogers-Day ===
(Rogers Construction Co, Gloucester NJ.)

- Rogers-Day 1922 Biplane

=== Rogožarski ===
(Prva Srpska Fabrika Aeroplana Zivojin Rogožarski A.D.)

- Rogožarski AZR
- Rogožarski IK-3
- Rogožarski PVT – two-seat advanced trainer (1934)
- Rogožarski PVT-H floatplane (1934)
- Rogožarski R-100
- Rogožarski R-313
- Rogožarski SIM-VI
- Rogožarski SIM-VI-A
- Rogožarski SIM-VIII
- Rogožarski SIM-X
- Rogožarski SIM-Xa
- Rogožarski SI-GIP
- Rogožarski SIM-XI
- Rogožarski SIM-XII-H – primary trainer floatplane (1936)
- Rogožarski SIM-XIV-H – coastal reconnaissance floatplane (1940)
- Rogožarski SIM-XIVB–H
- Rogožarski Brucoš
- Rogožarski Fizir F1V
- Zmaj Fizir FN

=== Rohner ===
(Oscar A Rohner, Aurora CO.)

- Rohner 1929 Monoplane

=== Rohr ===
((Fred H) Rohr Aircraft Corp, Chula Vista CA.)

- Rohr 2-175
- Rohr Guppy
- Rohr MR-1
- Rohr M.O.1
- Rohr PB2Y-3R

=== Rohrbach ===
(Rohrbach Metall-Flugzeugbau G.m.b.h.)

- Rohrbach Ro I
- Rohrbach Ro II
- Rohrbach Ro III
- Rohrbach Ro IIIa Rodra
- Rohrbach Ro IV Inverness
- Rohrbach Ro V Rocco
- Beardmore Inflexible
- Rohrbach Ro VII Robbe I
- Rohrbach Ro VIIa Robbe I
- Rohrbach Ro VIIb Robbe II
- Rohrbach Ro VIII Roland
- Rohrbach Ro IX Rofix
- Rohrbach Ro X Romar
- Rohrbach Ro XI Rostra
- Rohrbach Ro XII Roska
- Rohrbach Roterra
- Rohrbach Projekt A

=== Roko Aero ===
(Roko Aero a.s., Zlin, Czech Republic)

- Roko Aero NG4

=== Rokospol Aviation ===
(Prague, Czech Republic)

- Rokospol Via

=== Roland ===
(Luft-Fahrzeug-Gesellschaft) See:LFG Roland

=== Roland Aircraft ===
(Mendig, Germany)

- Roland Me 109 Replica
- Roland S-STOL
- Roland Z-120
- Roland Z-602

=== Rolandas Kalinauskas ===
- Rolandas Kalinauskas RK-1 Swallow
- Rolandas Kalinauskas RK-2 Lightning
- Rolandas Kalinauskas RK-3 Wind
- Rolandas Kalinauskas RK-4 Minija
- Rolandas Kalinauskas RK-5 Ruth
- Rolandas Kalinauskas RK-6 Magic
- Rolandas Kalinauskas RK-7 Orange
- Rolandas Kalinauskas RK-8
- Rolandas Kalinauskas RK-9 Palanga

=== Rolladen-Schneider ===
- Rolladen-Schneider LS1
- Rolladen-Schneider LSD Ornith
- Rolladen-Schneider LS2
- Rolladen-Schneider LS3
- Rolladen-Schneider LS4
- Rolladen-Schneider LS5
- Rolladen-Schneider LS6
- Rolladen-Schneider LS7
- Rolladen-Schneider LS8
- Rolladen-Schneider LS9
- Rolladen-Schneider LS10
- Akaflieg Köln LS11

=== Rolland ===
(Jean-Louis Rolland)

- Rolland 200BT Cobra

=== Rolland ===
(Yves Rolland, Cicero IL.)

- Rolland 1914 Monoplane

=== Rollason ===
- Rollason Beta
- Rollason Condor
- Rollason Turbulent

=== Roll Flight ===
(Schwelm, Germany)

- Roll Flight Duo
- Roll Flight MR V

=== Rolls-Royce ===
- Rolls-Royce Thrust Measuring Rig
- Rolls-Royce ACCEL

=== RomBAC ===
- RomBAC 1-11

=== Romano ===
(Eugene Romano Aerial Navigation Co, Seattle WA.)

- Romanoplane

=== Romano ===
(Chantiers Aéronavales Etienne Romano)

- Romano R.1
- Romano R.3
- Romano R.4
- Romano R.5
- Romano R.6
- Romano R.15
- Romano R.16
- Romano R.80
- Romano R.82
- Romano R.83
- Romano R.90
- Romano R.92
- Romano R.110
- Romano R.120

=== Romeo ===
(Aeroplani Romeo, Napoli) (The aircraft branch of Alfa-Romeo, built at Meridionali – IMAM – Industrie Meccaniche e Aeronautiche Meridonali)

- See Meridionali

=== Root ===
(L F Root, Compton CA.)

- Root Sport

=== Roques-Lefolcalvez ===
- Roques-Lefolcalvez monoplane

=== Rose ===
(David Rose, La Jolla, CA)

- Rose RP-4
- Rose JL-70 Rose's Rocket

=== Rose ===
((Jack W) Rose Aeroplane & Motor Co, 3521 Armitage Ave, Chicago IL.)

- Rose A-1 Parakeet
- Rose A-2 Parakeet
- Rose A-3 Parakeet
- Rose A-4 Parakeet
- Rhinehart-Rose A-4C Parakeet

=== Rosebrugh ===
(Roy H. Rosebrugh)

- Rosebrugh R.R.1 Special

=== Rosenhan ===
(Cort A Rosenhan, Midvale UT.)

- Rosenhan Model A

=== Roshon ===
(J W Roshon, Harrisburg PA.)

- Roshon 1908 multiplane

=== Ross ===
((Orrin E) Ross Aircraft Co, Amityville NY.)

- Ross Parasol RS-1
- Ross Parasol RS-2

=== Ross ===
- Ross R-2 Ibis
- Ross R-6
- Ross RH-3
- Ross RS-1 Zanonia
- Ross-Johnson RJ-5

=== Rossi Soavi Paolo ===
(Camposanto, Italy)

- Rossi Shuttle Quik

=== Rossy ===
- Wingsuit

=== Rosto ===
(Oliver Andre Rosto (Ole Augustinussen Røstø), Duluth MN.)

- Rosto Duluth 1

=== Rotec ===
(Rotec Engineering)

- Rotec Panther
- Rotec Rally 1
- Rotec Rally 2
- Rotec Rally 2B
- Rotec Rally Sport
- Rotec Rally 3

=== Roteron ===
(Roteron Inc, CA.)

- Roteron X-100

=== Roth ===
((Alfred R) Roth Aircraft Co, Chicago IL.)

- Roth A

=== Rotary Air Force ===
- RAF2000

=== Rotor Flight Dynamics ===
(Rotor Flight Dynamics Inc, Wimauma, Florida, United States)

- Rotor Flight Dynamics Dominator UltraWhite
- Rotor Flight Dynamics Dominator Single
- Rotor Flight Dynamics Dominator Tandem
- Rotor Flight Dynamics LFINO

=== Rotor Master ===
(Rotor Master Aircraft, San Diego CA.)

- Rotor Master Darby D-5G Boomerang

=== Rotor Sport ===
(Rotor Sport Helicopters Inc, Milnesville PA.)

- Rotor Sport Coupe RSH-1A

=== Rotor Wing ===
(Rotor Wing Systems)

- Rotor Wing No 1

=== Rotorcraft ===
(Rotorcraft Ltd., UK)

- Rotorcraft Grasshopper

=== Rotorcraft ===
(Rotorcraft SA (Pty) Limited)

- Rotorcraft Minicopter

=== Rotorcraft ===
(Rotorcraft Corp (pres: Gilbert McGill), 1850 Victory Blvd, Glendale CA.)

- Rotorcraft flying A-frame
- Rotorcraft Dragonfly
- Rotorcraft Heli-Jeep
- Rotorcraft RH-1 Pinwheel
- Rotorcraft XR-11 Dragonfly
- Rotorcraft XH-11 Dragonfly
- Rotorcraft X-2A

=== Rotorschmiede ===
(Rotorschmiede GmbH)

- Rotorschmiede VA115

=== RotorSport UK ===
- RotorSport UK Calidus
- RotorSport UK MT-03

=== Rotortec ===
(Görisried, Allgäu, Germany)

- Rotortec Cloud Dancer I
- Rotortec Cloud Dancer II
- Rotortec Cloud Dancer Light

=== Rotorvox ===
- Rotorvox C2A

=== RotorWay ===
(RotorWay (pres: John Netherwood), 4140 W Mercury Way, Chandler AZ. c.1970: Tempe AZ.)

- RotorWay Elite
- RotorWay Exec 90
- RotorWay Exec 162F
- RotorWay Scorpion
- RotorWay A600 Talon
- RotorWay 300T Eagle
- RotorWay Scorpion Too
- RotorWay Scorpion 133
- RotorWay Scorpion 145
- Rotorway Windstar

=== Rotorwing ===
(Rotorwing Aircraft Comp, Birmingham AL.)

- Rotorwing Sportsman

=== Rotorwing-Aero ===
- Rotorwing-Aero 3D-RV

=== Rouffaer ===
((Jan) Rouffaer Aircraft Corp, Oakland Airport, Oakland CA.)

- Rouffaer R-6

=== Rousch ===
((Berl & Charles) Rousch Bros Battery Co, 303 N Gross St, Robinson IL)

- Rousch 1928 Biplane

=== Rouse ===
(W Stewart Rouse, Chicago IL.)

- Rouse 1928 Monoplane

=== Roussel ===
(Jacques Roussel)

- Roussel 10
- Roussel R-30

=== Roussel ===
(Jean Roussel – brother of Jacques Roussel)

- Roussel 40 Hirondelle

=== Rover (canard delta) ===
- Rover (canard delta)

=== Rowe ===
(David rowe)

- Rowe UFO

=== Rowinski ===
(Nick Rowinski, Milwaukee WI.)

- Rowinski Racer
- Rowinski TM-1 Sport

=== Rowley ===
(76th Fighter Squadron Inc, Meadow Lake Airport, Colorado, United States)

- Rowley P-40F

=== Roy-Mignet ===
(Guy Roy)

- Roy-Mignet GR.01

=== Royal ===
(Royal Aircraft Factory, Garden City NY.)

- Royal Bird

=== Royal ===
(Royal Aircraft Corp, Royal Oak MI.)

- Royal Trainer

=== Royal ===
(Royal Aero Corp (pres: H C Miller), Los Angeles CA.)

- Royal Duster A-1

=== Royal Aircraft Factory ===
- Royal Aircraft Factory B.E.1
- Royal Aircraft Factory B.E.2
- Royal Aircraft Factory B.E.3
- Royal Aircraft Factory B.E.4
- Royal Aircraft Factory B.E.8
- Royal Aircraft Factory B.E.11
- Royal Aircraft Factory B.E.12
- Royal Aircraft Factory F.E.1
- Royal Aircraft Factory F.E.2
- Royal Aircraft Factory F.E.3
- Royal Aircraft Factory F.E.8
- Royal Aircraft Factory F.E.9
- Royal Aircraft Factory F.E.11
- Royal Aircraft Factory N.E.1
- Royal Aircraft Factory Ram
- Royal Aircraft Factory R.E.1
- Royal Aircraft Factory R.E.5
- Royal Aircraft Factory R.E.7
- Royal Aircraft Factory R.E.8
- Royal Aircraft Factory S.E.2
- Royal Aircraft Factory S.E.4
- Royal Aircraft Factory S.E.5
- Royal Aircraft Factory T.E.1

=== Royal Institute of Technology ===
(Royal Institute of Technology (Swedish: Kungliga Tekniska högskolan, abbreviated KTH))

- KTH Osquavia

=== Royal Naval dockyard ===
(Orlogsvaerftet – Danish Royal Dockyard)

- Orlogsvaerftet HM.II
- Orlogsvaerftet HB.III
- Orlogsvaerftet LB.IV
- Orlogsvaerftet LB.V

=== Royal Siamese Air Force Manufacturing Division ===
- Prajadhipok (aircraft)
- Fighter Type 5
- Boripatra
- Bomber Type 2

=== Royal Thai Air Force ===
- RTAF-2
- RTAF-3
- RTAF-4 Chantra
- RTAF-5
- RTAF-6

=== Royer & Montijo ===
- Royer & Montijo California Coupe

=== Roza ===
(Arthur Roza, Chicago IL.)

- Roza Sport

== Rr ==
=== RRA ===
(Ronchetti Razzetti Aviación SA)

- RRA J-1 Martin Fierro

=== RRAA ===
(Reconstructions Répliques Avions Anciens)

- RRAA Mosquito 0.75

=== RRG ===
(RRG – Rhön-Rossitten Gesellschaft – Rhön-Rossitten Society)

- RRG Storch V

== Ru ==
=== Rubik ===
(Ernő Rubik – father of the Rubik's Cube inventor

- Rubik R-01(MSrE M-20)
- Rubik R-02 (MSrE M-19)
- Rubik R-03 Szittya I
- Rubik R-04 Szittya I
- Rubik R-05 Vöcsök
- Rubik R-06 Vöcsök
- Rubik R-07 Vöcsök
- Rubik R-08 Pilis
- Rubik R-09 Pilis
- Rubik R-10 Szittya I
- Rubik R-11 Cimbora
- Rubik R-12 Kevély
- Rubik R-14 Pinty
- Rubik R-15 Koma
- Rubik R-16 Lepke
- Rubik R-17 Móka
- Rubik R-18 Kánya
- Rubik R-20 (OMRE-OE 1)
- Rubik R-22 Futár glider series including Junius, Super Futár, Standard Futár
- Rubik R-23 Gébics
- Rubik R-25 Mokány
- Rubik R-26 Góbé
- Rubik R-27 Kopé glider
- Rubik R-28 Fém Kánya – [Project] improved R-18 Kánya (metal structure), not built
- Rubik R-32 – light homebuilt aircraft design

=== Rublich-Hlavkov-Tomasov ===
(Zdenek Rublich, Zdenek Hlavkov & Karl Tomasov / Orlican Chocen factory)

- Rublich-Hlavkov-Tomasov R-7 Racek

=== Rud-Aero ===
- Rud Aero RA-2
- Rud Aero RA-3

=== Rudlicki ===
(Jerzy Rudlicki)

- Rudlicki glider No.1
- Rudlicki glider No.2
- Rudlicki glider No.3
- Rudlicki glider No.4
- Rudlicki glider No.5
- Rudlicki glider No.6
- Rudlicki glider No.7
- Rudlicki glider No.8
- Rudlicki glider No.9
- Rudlicki R-I

=== Ruffy-Baumann ===
(Ruffy, Arnell and Baumann Aviation Company / Felix Ruffy and Edouard Baumann / Ruffy and Richard Sayer Arnell from 1917)

- Ruffy-Baumann 50hp trainer (derived from the Caudron C.II which Ruffy-Baumann also licence-built)
- Ruffy-Baumann 60hp trainer (derived from the Caudron C.II which Ruffy-Baumann also licence-built)
- Ruffy-Baumann Advanced Trainer (single-seat / Anzani 6)
- Ruffy-Baumann R.A.B.15 (a.k.a. Elementary Trainer: after mods became Alliance P.1)
- Ruffy-Baumann Elementary Trainer (a.k.a. RAB.15: after mods became Alliance P.1)

=== Ruhrtaler ===
(Ruhrtaler Maschinenfabrik Schwarz und Dyckerhoff)

- Ruhrtaler Ru.3

=== Rummell ===
(Harry B Rummell, Findlay OH.)

- Rummell 1929 Monoplane

=== Rumpler ===
(Rumpler Flugzeug-Werke G.m.b.H.)

- Rumpler 3C Taube
- Rumpler 4A
- Rumpler 4A 13
- Rumpler 4A 14
- Rumpler 4A 15
- Rumpler 4B 1
- Rumpler 4B 2
- Rumpler 4B 11
- Rumpler 4B 12
- Rumpler 4C
- Rumpler 4E (flying boat)
- Rumpler 5A 2
- Rumpler 5A 3
- Rumpler 5A 4
- Rumpler 5A 15
- Rumpler 5A 16
- Rumpler 6A 2
- Rumpler 6A 5
- Rumpler 6A 6
- Rumpler 6A 7
- Rumpler 6B 1
- Rumpler 6B 2
- Rumpler 6G 2
- Rumpler 7C 1
- Rumpler 7D 1
- Rumpler 7D 2
- Rumpler 7D 3
- Rumpler 7D 4
- Rumpler 7D 5
- Rumpler 7D 6
- Rumpler 7D 7
- Rumpler 7D 8
- Rumpler 8C 13
- Rumpler 8C 14
- Rumpler 8D 1
- Rumpler B.I
- Rumpler C.I
- Rumpler C.III
- Rumpler C.IV
- Rumpler C.IV Limousine (DLR airliner conversions)
- Rumpler C.V
- Rumpler C.VI
- Rumpler C.VII
- Rumpler C.VIII
- Rumpler C.IX
- Rumpler C.X
- Rumpler D.I
- Rumpler G.I
- Rumpler G.II
- Rumpler G.III
- Rumpler Taube
- Rumpler Eindecker
- Rumpler C type experimental

=== Runnels ===
(Russell W Runnels, Wilmington OH.)

- Runnels Ruby RR-1

=== Rupe ===
(Gerald Rupe, Portland IN.)

- Rupe R-6 Mate

=== Rupert ===
(Walter Rupert, Beaverton OR.)

- Rupert Special

=== Rupert Aeronaves ===
(Charles Rupert Jones)

- Rupert B-7
- Rupert R-9
- Rupert R-11

=== Ruschmeyer ===
(Ruschmeyer Luftfahrttechnik)

- Ruschmeyer MF-85
- Ruschmeyer R 90
- Ruschmeyer R 95

=== Russell ===
(George F Russell, Mineola NY.)

- Russell 1911 Biplane

=== Russell ===
((Charles) Russel Aircraft, Malden MO.)

- Russell Aggie
- Russell BR-1

=== Russell ===
(Charles E Russell/Frank H Russell (?), Salt Lake City UT OR Ft Worth TX (?).)

- Russell Sport

=== Russell ===
(Michael Russell)

- Russell Acro

=== Russian Gyroplanes ===
- Russian Gyroplanes Gyros-1 Farmer
- Russian Gyroplanes Gyros-2 Smartflier

=== Russian miscellaneous Constructors (pre-1918) ===
- AIS 1917 torpedo carrier (Aviatsionnaya Ispitatelnaya Stantsiya, Morskaya Vedomsfva – naval air test station)
- Bezobrazov 1914 fighter (Aleksandr A. Bezobrazov)
- BIS 1 1910 pusher biplane (Bylinkin/Iordan/Sikorsky)
- BIS 2 1910 tractor biplane (wings of BIS 1 used with new fuselage)
- Bylinkin 1910 monoplane (Fidor Ivanovich Bylinkin)
- ChUR No.1 1912 monoplane (G.G. Chechet/M.K. Ushkov/N.V. Rebikov)
- Dybovskii 1913 monoplane Delfin – Dolphin (Lt. Viktor V. Dybovskii)
- Izhorskii 6-engined biplane bomber
- Izhorskii 6-engined triplane bomber
- Karpeka 1910 biplane (No's 1-4 all similar) (Aleksandr Danilovich Karpeka)
- Keburiya 1909 glider (Vissarion Savelyevich Keburiya)
- Keburiya 1912 monoplane
- Keburiya 1913 monoplane
- Kostovich 1911 (Ogneslav Stefanovich Kostovich)
- Kostovich 1914 seaplane
- Kostovich 1916 monoplane amphibian
- Kress 1900 seaplane (Vasilii Vasilyevich {Wilhelm} Kress)
- Kudashyev 1 1910 biplane (first flight of Russian aircraft 23 May 1910) (Aleksandr Sergeyevich Kudashyev)
- Kudashyev 2 1910 biplane
- Kudashyev 3 1910 monoplane
- Kudashyev 4 1911 monoplane
- LYaM 1912 monoplane (Maksim Germanovich Lerke, Georgii Viktorovich Yankovski and F.E. Moska)
- Mozhaiskii 1884 steam powered monoplane (Aleksandr Fedorovich Mozhaiskii)
- Rudlitsky 1911 biplane (Georgii Valeryevich Rudlitsky) (Is this the Jerzy Rudlicki that developed the V-tailin Poland during the 1920s and '30s?)
- Savelyev 1916 Quadruplane (Vladimir Fedorovich Savelyev)
- Shishmaryev GASN (Gidro-Aeroplan Spetsialno Naznachyeniya – seaplane special destination) (Mikhail Mikhailovich Shishmaryev)
- Shkolin 1909 monoplane (Luka Vasilyevich Shkolin)
- Shiukov gliders 1908-1910 (Aleksei Vladimirovich Shiukov)
- Shiukov Utka 1912 canard monoplane
- Slesarev biplane Svyatogor (Vasilii andrianovich Slesarev)
- Slyusarenko 1917 fighter (Vladimir Viktorovich Slyusarenko + wife)
- Slyusarenko biplane
- Steglau No.1 biplane (Ivan Ivanovich Steglau)
- Steglau No.2 biplane
- Steglau No.3 monoplane
- Sveshnikov-Vandom monoplane (Aleksandr Nikolayevich Sveshnikov) (built in France)
- Sveshnikov No.2 monoplane (built in Kiev)
- Sveshnikov No.3 monoplane (built in Kiev)
- Ufimestev No.1 1909 Spheroplan (Anatolii Georgyevich Ufimestev)
- Ufimestev No.2 Spheroplan
- Villish 1913 monoplane Severenaya Lastochka – northern swallow (Aleksandr Yustoosovich Villish)
- Villish VM-1
- Yur'yev 1912 helicopter (Boris Nikolayevich Yur'yev) (Yuriev)

=== Rust ===
(Hilmar & Roy Rust, Waring TX.)

- Rust 1934 Monoplane

=== Rutan ===
(Burt Rutan)

- Rutan Boomerang
- Rutan Grizzly
- Rutan SkiGull
- Rutan Solitaire
- Rutan Long-EZ
- Rutan Quickie
- Rutan VariEze
- Rutan VariViggen

=== Rutan Aircraft Factory ===
- Rutan Model 27 Variviggen
- Rutan Model 31 VariEze
- Rutan Model 32 Variviggen SP
- Rutan Model 33 VariEze
- Rutan Model 35 AD-1
- Rutan Model 40 Defiant
- Rutan Model 49
- Rutan Model 54 Quickie
- Rutan Model 61 Long-EZ
- Rutan Model 68 AMSOIL Racer
- Rutan Model 72 Grizzly
- Rutan Model 73 NGT: Three-fifths scale model of Fairchild T-46 trainer
- Rutan Model 74 Defiant
- Rutan Model 76 Voyager: First aircraft to circumnavigate the Earth non-stop
- Rutan Model 77 Solitaire
- Rutan Model 81 Catbird
- Rutan Model 89
- Rutan Model 202 Boomerang

== Rw ==
=== RWD ===
(Stanisław Rogalski, Stanisław Wigura and Jerzy Drzewiecki – up to 1933 then manufactured by DWL – ''Doświadczalne Warsztaty Lotnicze'' – experimental aeronautical works)

- RWD 1
- RWD 2
- RWD 3
- RWD 4
- RWD 5
- RWD 6
- RWD 7
- RWD 8
- RWD 9
- RWD 10
- RWD 11
- RWD 13
- RWD 14 Czapla
- RWD 15
- RWD 16
- RWD 17
- RWD 18
- RWD 19
- RWD 20
- RWD 21
- RWD 22
- RWD 23
- RWD 24
- RWD 25 Sokól
- RWD 26
- Kocjan Bᾳk (horse-fly)

== Ry ==
=== Ryan ===
(Ryan Aeronautical)

- Ryan FR Fireball
- Ryan F2R Dark Shark
- Ryan L-10 SCW
- Ryan L-17 Navion
- Ryan L-22 Super Navion
- Ryan Model 182
- Ryan Model 186
- Ryan Model 187
- Ryan NR Recruit
- Ryan O-51 Dragonfly
- Ryan PT-16
- Ryan PT-20
- Ryan PT-21
- Ryan PT-22 Recruit
- Ryan PT-25
- Ryan SOR
- Ryan V-5 Vertifan
- Ryan V-8
- Ryan VZ-3 Vertiplane
- Ryan VZ-11 Vertifan
- Ryan X-13 Vertijet
- Mahoney-Ryan B Brougham
- Mahoney-Ryan X
- Ryan B Brougham
- Ryan C Foursome
- Ryan Flamingo
- Ryan M Brougham
- Ryan Model 28 Fireball
- Ryan Navion
- Ryan NYP (New-York – Paris)
- Ryan SC
- Ryan ST
- Ryan STM
- Ryan Super Navion
- Ryan X-1 Special

=== Ryan Mechanics ===
(Ryan Mechanics Monoplane Co, 145 W Slauson Ave, Los Angeles CA)

- Ryan Mechanics Lone Eagle CM-1

=== Ryson ===
(T Claude Ryan & Son (Jerry D), San Diego CA.)

- Ryson STP-1 Swallow
- Ryson ST-100 Cloudster
