= Rubik R-12 Kevély =

Hungarian advanced training glider

R-12 Kevély
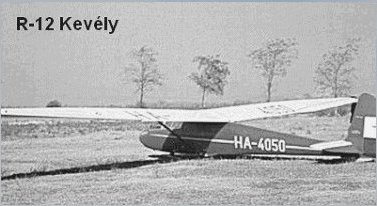

General information
- Type: Tertiary level sailplane
- National origin: Hungary
- Manufacturer: Aero Ever Ltd.
- Designer: Ernő Rubik
- Number built: c.50

History
- First flight: April 1941
- Retired: 1951

The Rubik R-12 Kevély (Proud) was a Hungarian advanced training glider. It was designed to provide safe cloud-flying experience and also raised the Hungarian height gained record several times. About fifty were built and operated between 1941 and 1951.

== Design and development ==
The National Aviation foundation (Note: Országos Magyar Repülö Egyesület, or OMRE)'s glider training programme progressed with three well defined steps, each using one of Ernö Rubik's designs: the R-07 at the primary stage, followed by the secondary R-08 Pilis and the tertiary, relatively high performance R-12 Kevély. The foundation specified two particular properties for the latter, robustness and the ability to fly safely in cloud.

The Kevély's high wing, mounted on top of the fuselage, had a rectangular-plan inner panel covering half the span and trapezoidal outer panels out to rounded tips. The leading edges of these outer panels were only slightly swept, with most of the taper on their trailing edges. They also carried considerable washout, deceasing the likelihood of tip stalling though reducing high-speed performance. The wing was built around a single spar with plywood skin ahead of it, forming a torsion-resistant D-box. Aft of the spar the wing was fabric covered. On each side a single bracing strut ran from the lower fuselage to the spar at about 25% span. Generous Göppingen-type air brakes were mounted between the ends of the bracing struts and the start of the tapered panels. Ailerons ran from the tips with constant chord apart from a short stretch when they entered the inner panels.

The glider had a plywood-skinned semi-monocoque fuselage. The pilot sat ahead of the leading edge in a cockpit enclosed by a curved, multi-framed canopy which smoothly followed the fuselage lines. Large, sliding windows gave good side views and the instrument panel was equipped for cloud flying. Landings were made on a semi-recessed monowheel, equipped with brakes, just aft of the base of the bracing struts and assisted by skids under the forward fuselage and the tail. The fuselage tapered rearwards, where the tailplane was mounted on top of the fuselage and strut-braced. Tailplane and elevators together were trapezoidal out the rounded tips. The fin was small but carried a large, roughly quadrantal balanced rudder, hinged far enough aft to clear the elevators. The fixed surfaces were ply-covered and control surfaces fabric-covered.

== Operational history ==
The Kevély proved popular with aeroclubs, some of whom built their own and others purchased from Aero Ever, who built twenty-five, or from the Aircraft Factory of Transylvania who built eight. The dangers for a novice in cloud, despite the instrumentation, were of flying too fast or of entering a spin. The Kevély's airbrakes could be opened in cloud to slow it down and though it could enter a spin this was slow in both speed and rate of rotation. Centralization of the controls quickly returned the aircraft to normal flight without large loss of altitude.

At least three Hungarian height gain records were set by the Kevély, the best at 5,053 m (16,578 ft) by Pál Vojnits. It also made long cross country flights, the longest over 312 km (194 mi; 168 nmi).

== Specifications ==
Data from Gabor, F

General characteristics

- Crew: One
- Length: 7.78 m (25 ft 6 in)
- Wingspan: 18 m (59 ft 1 in)
- Wing area: 20.7 m^{2} (223 sq ft)
- Aspect ratio: 15.64
- Airfoil: Göttingen Gö 549 out to Gö 676 tips
- Empty weight: 264 kg (582 lb)
- Gross weight: 358 kg (789 lb)

Performance

- Maximum speed: 210 km/h (130 mph, 110 kn) VNE with airbrakes open
- Stall speed: 54 km/h (34 mph, 29 kn)
- Maximum glide ratio: 24 at 65 km/h (40 mph; 35 kn)
- Rate of sink: 0.68 m/s (134 ft/min) minimum, at 60 km/h (37 mph; 32 kn)
- Maximum speed in rough air: 100 km/h (62 mph; 54 kn)
