= R33 =

R33 may refer to:

- R-33 (missile), a Soviet air-to-air missile
- R33 (South Africa), a road
- R33 (New York City Subway car)
- HM Airship R.33, of the Royal Air Force
- HMS Terpsichore (R33), a destroyer of the Royal Navy
- INS Vikramaditya (R33), an aircraft carrier of the Indian navy
- Nissan Skyline (R33), a mid-size car
- Nissan Skyline GT-R (R33), a sports car
- R33: Danger of cumulative effects, a risk phrase
- Renard R.33, a Belgian trainer
- Urinary retention
- Wakonda Beach State Airport in Lincoln County, Oregon
