= R17 =

R17 or R-17 may refer to:

== Vessels ==
- HMAS Sydney (R17), an aircraft carrier of the Royal Australian Navy
- HMCS Algonquin (R17), also HMS Valentine (R17), a destroyer of the Royal Canadian Navy and Royal Navy
- USS R-17 (SS-94), a submarine of the United States Navy

== Other uses ==
- R17 (New York City Subway car)
- R17 (Rodalies de Catalunya), a regional rail service in Catalonia, Spain
- R-17 (TV series), a 2001 Japanese TV series
- BMW R17, a motorcycle
- ISO Recommendation R17, concerning preferred numbers
- Oppo R17, a smartphone
- R17: Spontaneously flammable in air, a risk phrase
- R-17 Elbrus, a Soviet ballistic missile
- R-17 regional road (Montenegro)
- Renard R.17, a Belgian civil utility aircraft
- Renault 17, a French car
- Rubik R-17 Móka, a Hungarian glider
