= Renard Epervier =

Belgian prototype fighter monoplane

Epervier

General information
- Type: Fighter
- Manufacturer: Societé Anonyme Avions et Moteurs Renard contracted to Stampe et Vertongen and SABCA
- Designer: Alfred Renard
- Number built: 2

History
- First flight: 1928

The Renard Epervier was a Belgian prototype single-seat all-metal fighter monoplane designed by Alfred Renard at the Societé Anonyme Avions et Moteurs Renard for a government-sponsored design contest in 1928. The Epervier Type 2 was built and flown in 1928, by Belgian aircraft manufacturer Stampe et Vertongen. It carried an armament of two synchronised 7.7mm guns and was lost in September 1928 after failing to recover from a flat spin. A second prototype, the Epervier Type 2bis, introduced revised streamlined fairings for the cantilever mainwheel legs, mainwheel spats and cylinder aft-fairings and was built by SABCA (Société Anonyme Belge de Constructions Aéronautiques).

== Variants ==
Epervier Type 2
The prototype fighter designed, built and flown by Stampe et Vertongen in 1928, crashing in a flat spin in September 1928: one built.
Epervier Type 2bis
A replacement aircraft for the first prototype, built by SABCA and powered by a 480 hp (360 kW) SABCA Jupiter or 700 hp (520 kW) Hispano-Suiza 12N engine.; one built.
Epervier Type 3
A developed version to have been powered by a 480 hp (360 kW) Rolls-Royce Kestrel V-12 engine; not built.

== Specifications - Type 2bis ==
Data from Jane's all the World's Aircraft 1931, The Complete Book of Fighters

General characteristics

- Crew: 1
- Length: 7 m (23 ft 0 in) (Jupiter) 7.2 m (24 ft) (Hispano-Suiza 12N)
- Wingspan: 10.2 m (33 ft 6 in)
- Height: 2.76 m (9 ft 1 in)
- Wing area: 20 m^{2} (220 sq ft)
- Empty weight: 794 kg (1,750 lb) (Jupiter); 844 kg (1,861 lb) (Hispano-Suiza 12N)
- Gross weight: 1,250 kg (2,756 lb) (Jupiter); 1,300 kg (2,900 lb) (Hispano-Suiza 12N)
- Powerplant: 1 × SABCA Jupiter 9-cylinder air-cooled radial piston engine, 360 kW (480 hp) (or 700 hp (520 kW) Hispano-Suiza 12N V-12)

Performance

- Maximum speed: 273 km/h (170 mph, 147 kn) (Jupiter); 290 km/h (180 mph; 160 kn) (Hispano-Suiza 12N)

at 4,000 m (13,000 ft) - 265 km/h (165 mph; 143 kn)(Jupiter); 274 km/h (170 mph; 148 kn) (Hispano-Suiza 12N)
at 5,000 m (16,000 ft) - 261 km/h (162 mph; 141 kn)(Jupiter); 269 km/h (167 mph; 145 kn) (Hispano-Suiza 12N)

- Stall speed: 99 km/h (62 mph, 53 kn) (Jupiter); 101 km/h (63 mph; 55 kn) (Hispano-Suiza 12N)
- Service ceiling: 9,300 m (30,500 ft) practical ceiling (Jupiter); 8,600 m (28,200 ft) practical ceiling (Hispano-Suiza 12N)
- Time to altitude: 4,000 m (13,000 ft) in 8 minutes 30 seconds; 5,000 m (16,000 ft) in 12 minutes 35 seconds (Jupiter)

5,000 m (16,000 ft) in 9 minutes 55 seconds; 5,000 m (16,000 ft) in 14 minutes 40 seconds (Hispano-Suiza 12N)

- Wing loading: 62.5 kg/m^{2} (12.8 lb/sq ft) (Jupiter); 64 kg/m^{2} (13 lb/sq ft) (Hispano-Suiza 12N)
- Power/mass: 3.49 kg/kW (5.74 lb/hp) (Jupiter); 5.02 kg/kW (8.25 lb/hp) (Hispano-Suiza 12N)

Armament

- Guns: 2x synchronised fixed forward firing 7.7 mm (0.303 in) Vickers machine-guns in the forward fuselage

== Bibliography ==
- Hauet, André (April 1971). "Le Renard "Epervier"". Le album de fanatique de l'Aviation (in French) (21): 8–10. ISSN 0757-4169.
