= Rutan Grizzly =

Tandem-wing STOL research aircraft

Grizzly
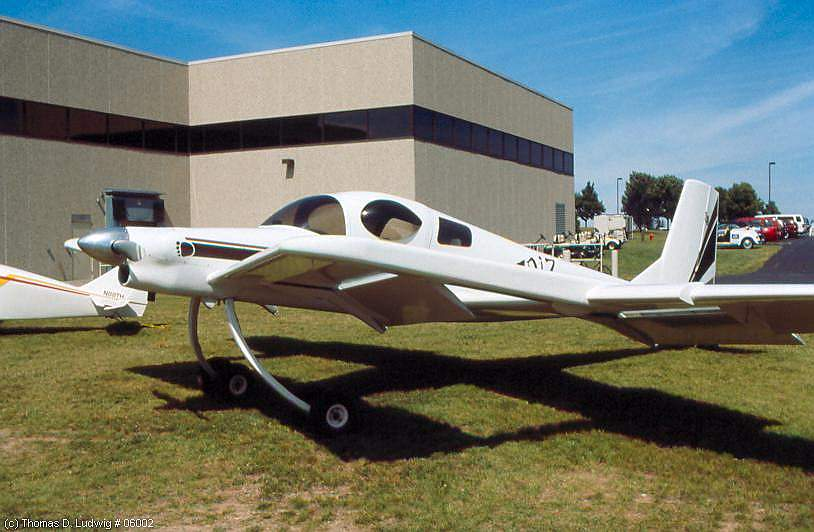
- Rutan Grizzly at the EAA AirVenture Museum, Oshkosh. Image courtesy by TDL.

General information
- Type: Tandem-wing STOL research aircraft
- Manufacturer: Rutan Aircraft Factory
- Designer: Burt Rutan
- Number built: 1

History
- First flight: January 22, 1982
- Preserved at: EAA AirVenture Museum, Oshkosh

The Rutan Model 72 Grizzly is a tandem-wing STOL research aircraft designed by Burt Rutan, now preserved at the EAA AirVenture Museum, Oshkosh. The aircraft exhibited low stall speeds and excellent short take-off and landing (STOL) capabilities.

== Design and development ==
This composite-construction aircraft features three lifting surfaces: A front wing with approximately half the span of the main wing and a cruciform empennage. Front and main wings are connected by a pair of struts with square cross-section which also serve as fuel tanks. Both wings carry Fowler flaps on part of their span for STOL which increased wing area by over 45 square feet. The fixed tail-wheel undercarriage has four low-pressure, small-diameter main-wheels, on two cantilever spring struts, with a spring mounted tail-wheel assembly. The four-seat cabin is completely enclosed with a combination of flat, squared and outward-bulged tear-drop shaped windows. The cabin converted to sleep two; folding of the rear seat allowed for a 78-inch bed.

After completion of testing the Grizzly was donated to the EAA AirVenture Museum, Oshkosh in 1997.

== Specifications ==
Data from Jane's all the World's Aircraft 1984–85

General characteristics

- Crew: 1
- Capacity: 3 passengers
- Powerplant: 1 × Lycoming O-360B 4-cylinder air-cooled horizontally-opposed piston engine, 180 hp (130 kW)
- Propellers: 2-bladed Hartzell Q-tip constant speed propeller

Performance

- Stall speed: 35 kn (40 mph, 65 km/h)
