= Rafaelyants RAF-11 =

1930s Soviet airliner

RAF-11

General information
- Type: Transport aircraft
- National origin: Soviet Union
- Designer: Aram Rafaelyants
- Number built: 2

History
- First flight: 1938

The Rafaelyants RAF-11 was a Soviet transport aircraft of the late 1930s, designed by Aram Rafaelyants and first flown in 1938.

== Design and development ==
The RAF-11 was built from 1937 to 1938 and first flown in 1938. It was a twin-engine cantilever monoplane with a semi-monocoque fuselage, powered by two 300 hp (220 kW) Kossov MG-31 engines. The aircraft was of wooden construction with ply covering at the back of the wings and fabric throughout. The wing was of two-spar construction. The landing gear retracted into the engine nacelles using a hydraulic system and an additional pneumatic system for emergency extension. The aircraft had a capacity of six passengers. The RAF-11 was too heavy and its performance unimpressive.

In 1940, the RAF-11bis first flew, which was a refined version of the RAF-11. It had reduced weight and slightly reduced fuel capacity. The aircraft was fitted with more powerful 330 hp (250 kW) MG-31F engines. The RAF-11bis had outstanding performance and could be used in both airliner and trainer roles. Series production was to start in 1941 but never commenced due to World War II. Both examples flew during the war.

== Specifications (RAF-11bis) ==
Data from The Osprey Encyclopedia of Russian Aircraft

General characteristics

- Crew: two
- Capacity: six passengers
- Length: 10.1 m (33 ft 2 in)
- Wingspan: 15 m (49 ft 3 in)
- Wing area: 30 m^{2} (320 sq ft)
- Empty weight: 2,097 kg (4,623 lb)
- Gross weight: 3,000 kg (6,614 lb)
- Powerplant: 1 × Kossov MG-31F nine-cylinder radial engine, 250 kW (330 hp)

Performance

- Maximum speed: 294 km/h (183 mph, 159 kn)
- Cruise speed: 257 km/h (160 mph, 139 kn)
- Range: 930 km (580 mi, 500 nmi)
- Service ceiling: 4,500 m (14,800 ft)
- Time to altitude: 3.5 minutes to 1,000 m (3,300 ft)
- Takeoff roll: 355 m (1,165 ft) in 18 seconds
- Landing roll: 290 m (950 ft) in 18 seconds, 108 km/h (67 mph)
