= Rubik R-08 Pilis =

Hungarian single-seat training glider

R-08 Pilis
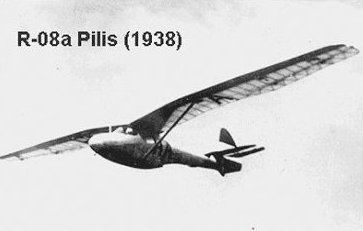
- First prototype

General information
- Type: Advanced training glider
- National origin: Hungary
- Manufacturer: Aero Ever Kft., Esztergom
- Designer: Ernő Rubik
- Number built: 269 including all variants.

History
- First flight: R-08a 15 or 19 March 1939.

The Rubik R-08 Pilis was a Hungarian single-seat, advanced training glider first flown in 1939. It was very successful; 269 were built in batches, the first starting in 1939 and the last in 1956.

== Design and development ==
In designing the Pilis, Ernő Rubik was influenced by the arrival in Hungary of a German Göppingen Gö 1 advanced trainer, itself a response to the Grunau Baby. The Pilis emerged as a smaller development of his Szittya.

The prototype (R-08a) and first production model (R-08b) of the Pilis had gull wings but later versions had wings without dihedral. All were mounted on top of the fuselage and had a single spar with plywood covering forward of it around the leading edge, forming a torsion resistant D-box. An internal drag strut ran from the inboard spar to the fuselage and the area ahead of this spar was also ply covered. The rest of the wing was fabric covered. The inner part of the wing plan was rectangular but the outer panels tapered to rounded tips. Long span ailerons were mounted at an angle to the main spar and had constant chord over most of their length but tapered on reaching the inner part. The first two production variants, like the prototype, had no airbrakes but these were introduced on the R-08d, initially designated R-09, mounted on the rear of the spar between the tapered section and the drag strut.

The Pilis's fuselage was a ply semi-monocoque structure with strengthening frames and stringers, roughly oval in section but with sharp junctions above and below. The forward part, with the wing on its top and open cockpit below and immediately ahead of the leading edge, was deepest before tapering to the tail. Overall, the fuselage of the prototype appeared to be slightly curved in profile but correction of control problems in landing flare led to a straightened fuselage, lengthened by 640 mm (25.20 in), for all production variants. All production models had similar tails, with tapered and round-tipped horizontal surfaces mounted just above the fuselage, to which the tailplane was braced with a single strut on each side. Tailplane and elevators had roughly equal areas. The rudder was full, curved and mounted on a very small fin. The tail of the first prototype, the R-08a was a little different from those of production aircraft, with a taller fin, unbalanced rudder and a noticeably taller tailplane pylon.

All Pilis had a standard rubber-sprung landing skid under the forward fuselage. On most this ran from the nose almost to the wing trailing edge but some later R-08ds and B-2s (a new name for R-08ds built in a production run started in 1956) had a shorter skid, which ended below the bottom of the wing strut, with a semi-exposed monowheel just aft of it. The same late series introduced enclosed cockpits; all earlier models had a removable ply cockpit surround, of model-dependent size, fitted with a simple windscreen which left the pilot's head and shoulders exposed but on these late examples the screen was replaced with an enclosing transparency.

One B-2, the Győr 3 Motor-Pilis, was motorized with an 18 kW (24 hp) Porsche engine mounted in pusher configuration on struts above the wing. It had a fully exposed wheel at the bottom of the wing strut. Though it flew successfully, no more were built.

== Variants ==
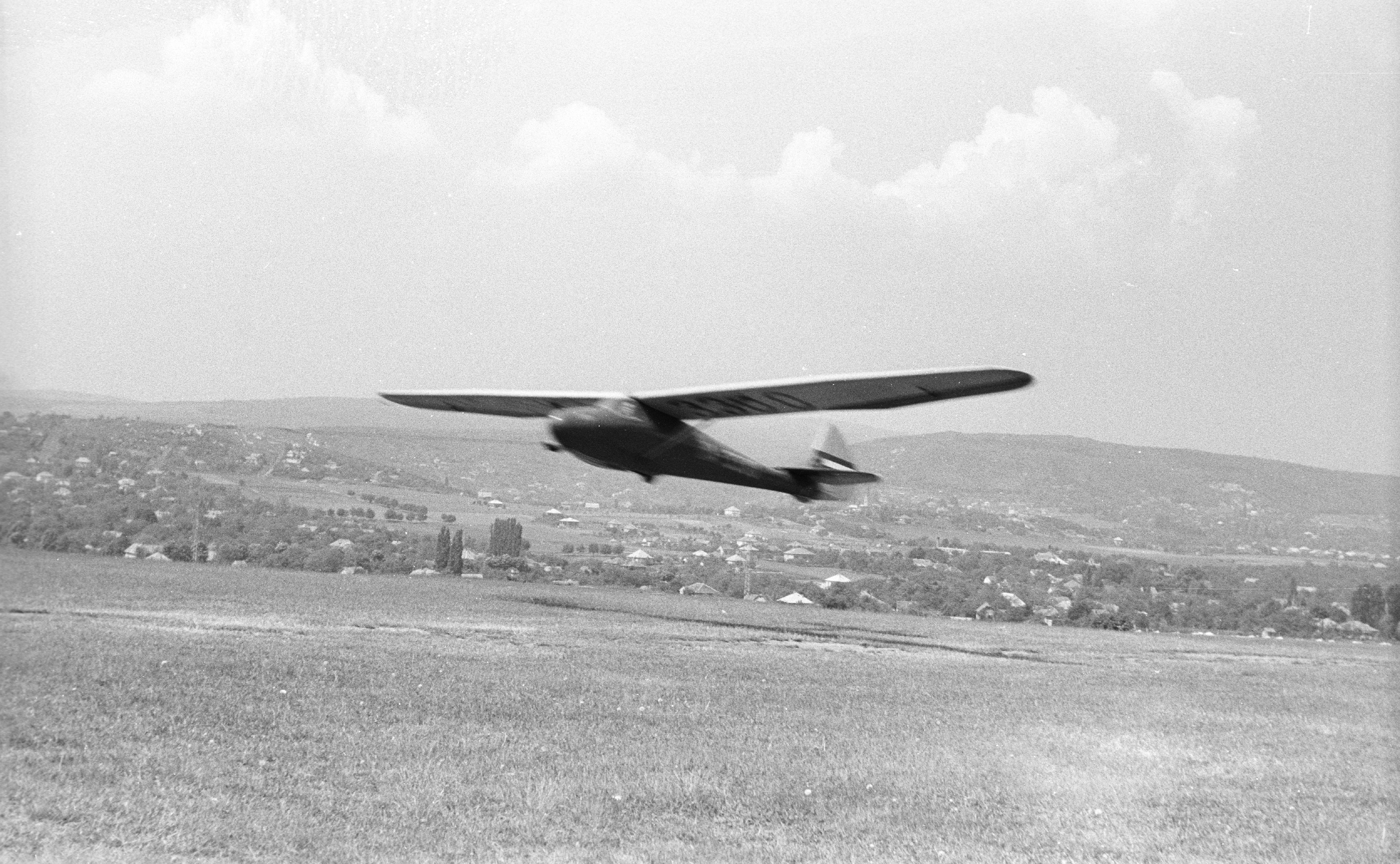
Late production R-08D with mono-wheel.

R-08a A-Polis
Prototype, with gull wing. 1 built.
R-08b B-Polis
First production model, with gull wing and straightened and lengthened fuselage to improve landing characteristics. Rudder balanced. 5 built.
R-08c C-Polis
Straight wing. 70 built.
R-08d D-Polis
Prototype (originally known as the R-09) flew in 1943 but no production until 1948. Airbrakes fitted. Post-1953, some R-08ds had a landing wheel. 97 built, the send half having removable, enclosed cockpits. 67 built.
B-2 Pilis
Alternative name for R-08ds built in production run started in 1956. 31 built, half with both open and half with closed cockpits.
Győr 3 Motor-Pilis
A B-2 fitted with an 18 kW (24 hp) Porsche engine mounted above the wing. Modified landing gear.

== Aircraft on display ==
- R-08D Pilis HA-3391, Kzlekedesi Muzeum, Budapest.

Several more examples are stored here and elsewhere in Hungary and may be examined with advanced notice.

== Specifications (R-08c C-Polis) ==
Data from j Habor

General characteristics

- Crew: One
- Length: 6.74 m (22 ft 1 in)
- Wingspan: 13.6 m (44 ft 7 in)
- Wing area: 15.7 m^{2} (169 sq ft)
- Aspect ratio: 11.78
- Airfoil: Göttingen Gö 533 root, W 339 mid-span, W 229 tip.
- Empty weight: 145 kg (320 lb)
- Gross weight: 245 kg (540 lb)

Performance

- Maximum speed: 160 km/h (99 mph, 86 kn) VNE
- Maximum glide ratio: 17
- Rate of sink: 0.95 m/s (187 ft/min) minimum
