= Rigault Deproux RD-3 =

Type of aircraft

The Rigault-Deproux RD-3 was a tourism gyroplane built by the French company Rigault-Deproux in the 1960s.

== Design ==
The RD-3 was a two-seat design powered by a 105 shp (78 kW) Potez 4E-20 4-cylinder air-cooled horizontally opposed piston engine.

General characteristics

- Crew: 2
- Length: 3.5 m (11 ft 6 in) fuselage
- Height: 2.37 m (7 ft 9 in)
- Empty weight: 340 kg (750 lb)
- Gross weight: 545 kg (1,202 lb)
- Powerplant: 1 × Potez 4E-20 4-cylinder air-cooled horizontally-opposed piston engine, 78 kW (105 hp)
- Main rotor diameter: 8.4 m (27 ft 7 in)

Performance

- Maximum speed: 105 km/h (65 mph, 57 kn)
- Range: 300 km (190 mi, 160 nmi)
- Service ceiling: 3,000 m (9,800 ft)
