= Rafaelyants RAF-1 =

1920s Soviet ultralight aircraft

RAF-1

General information
- Type: Ultralight aircraft
- National origin: Soviet Union
- Designer: Aram Rafaelyants
- Number built: 1

History
- First flight: 7 September 1925

The Rafaelyants RAF-1 was a Soviet single-seat, single-engine ultralight aircraft built and flown in 1925.

== Development ==
The RAF-1 was the first aircraft built by Aram Nazarovich Rafaelyants, then a student at the Zhukovsky Air Force Academy. Design of the aircraft began in mid 1923. It was supposed to be inexpensive to operate and easy to manufacture and repair. The aircraft was a single-seat low-wing cantilever monoplane of wood and fabric construction powered by a 18 hp (13 kW) Blackburne Tomtit engine. It had wooden undercarriage.

Construction was completed by 25 August 1925 and the aircraft was assembled at Khodynka Aerodrome. The RAF-1 was first flown on 7 September 1925. Later it also made successful flights near Feodosia and Koktebel in a glider competition. Testing was complete by 23 March 1926. The RAF-1 performed well and its performance was comparable to the de Havilland DH.53 Humming Bird.

== Specifications ==
Data from The Osprey Encyclopedia of Russian Aircraft

General characteristics

- Crew: one
- Length: 5.5 m (18 ft 1 in)
- Wingspan: 9.4 m (30 ft 10 in)
- Wing area: 12.6 m^{2} (136 sq ft)
- Airfoil: Prandtl 426
- Empty weight: 175 kg (386 lb)
- Gross weight: 273 kg (602 lb)
- Powerplant: 1 × Blackburne Tomtit air-cooled V-twin engine, 13 kW (18 hp)

Performance

- Maximum speed: 105 km/h (65 mph, 57 kn) at sea level
- Endurance: 4.5 hours
- Service ceiling: 3,250 m (10,660 ft)
