= Richard-Penhoët 2 =

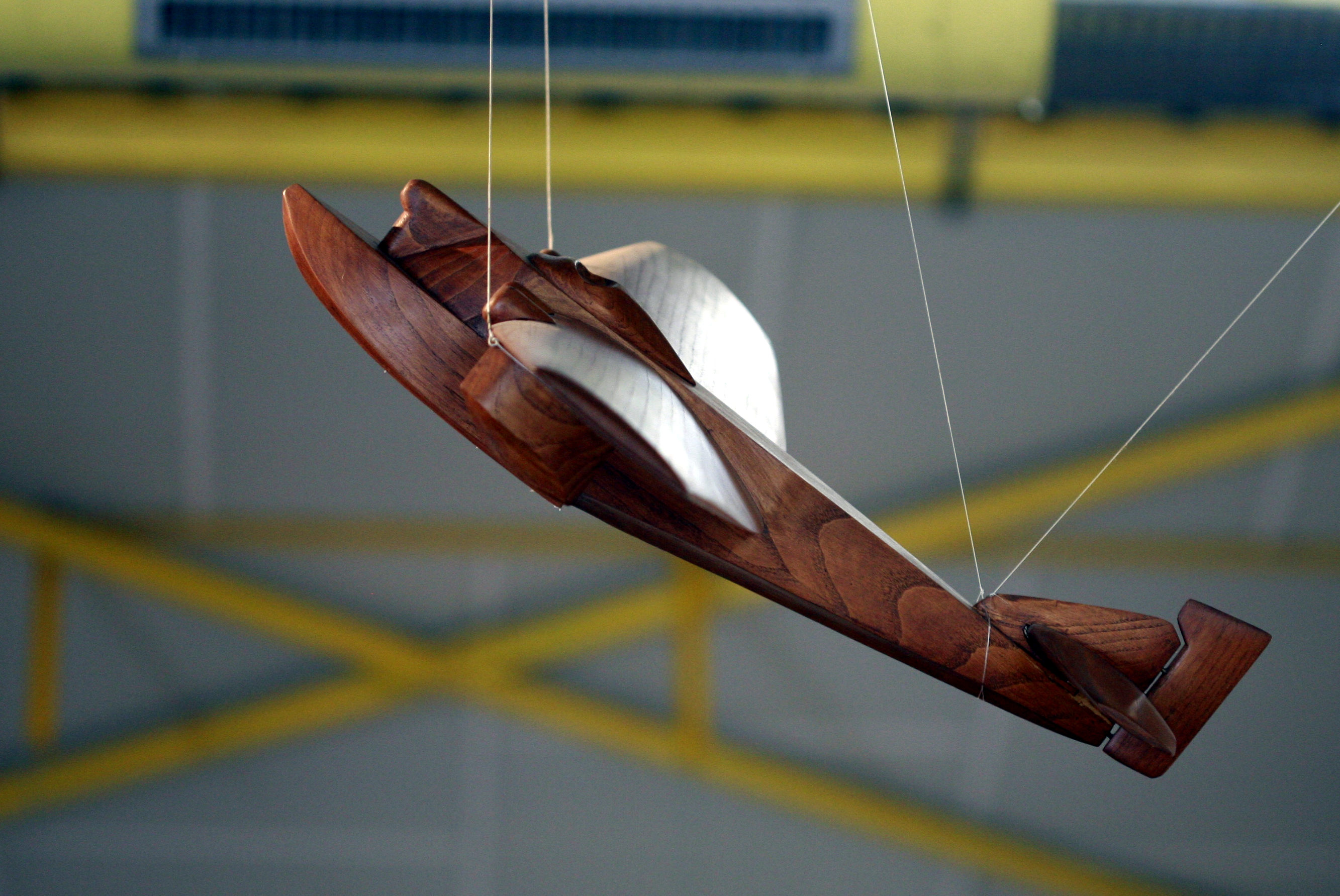
- Wind tunnel model of the Richard-Penhoët 2

General information
- Type: Long-range maritime reconnaissance flying boat
- National origin: France
- Manufacturer: Chantiers de Penhoët
- Designer: Paul-A Richard
- Status: Destroyed 26 April 1928
- Number built: 1

History
- First flight: August 1926

The Richard-Penhoët 2 was a 1926 French, large, five-engined flying-boat airliner, carrying up to twenty passengers. The sole example flew in 1926 but was lost in 1928 during testing after modification to improve performance.

== Design and development ==
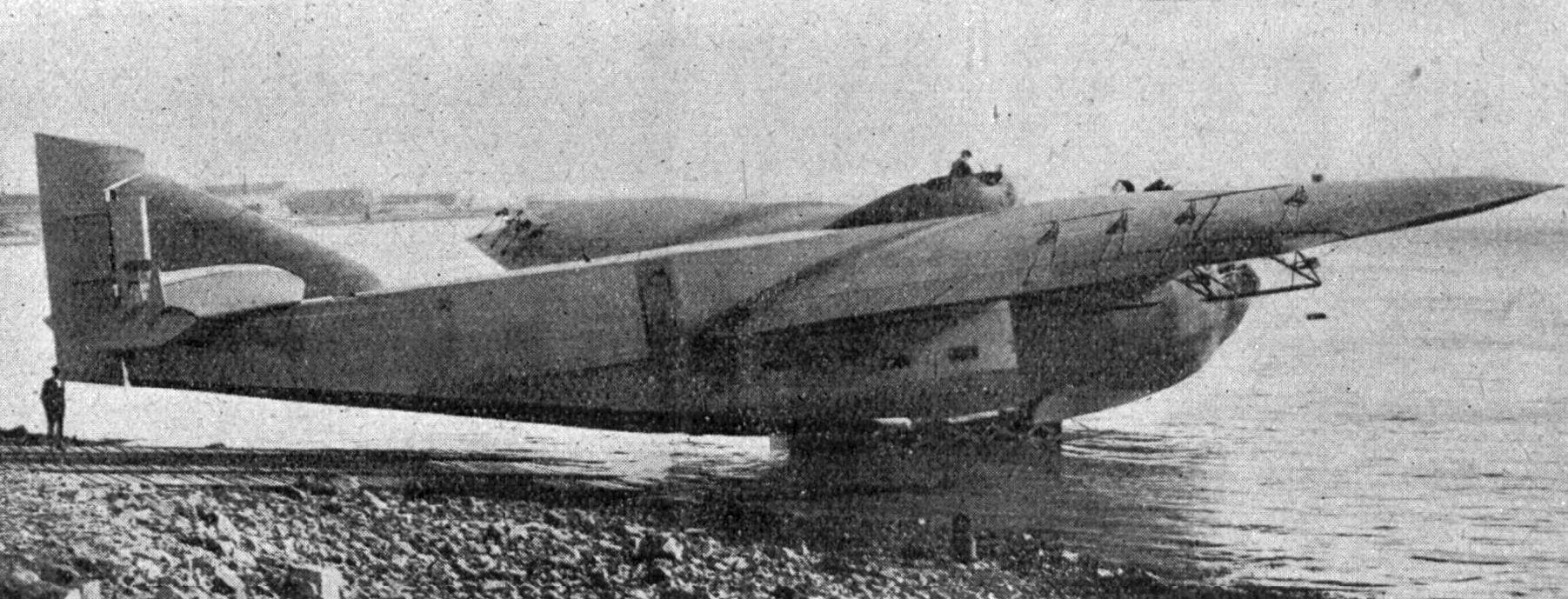
Richard-Penhoët 2 photo from L'Aérophile October,1926

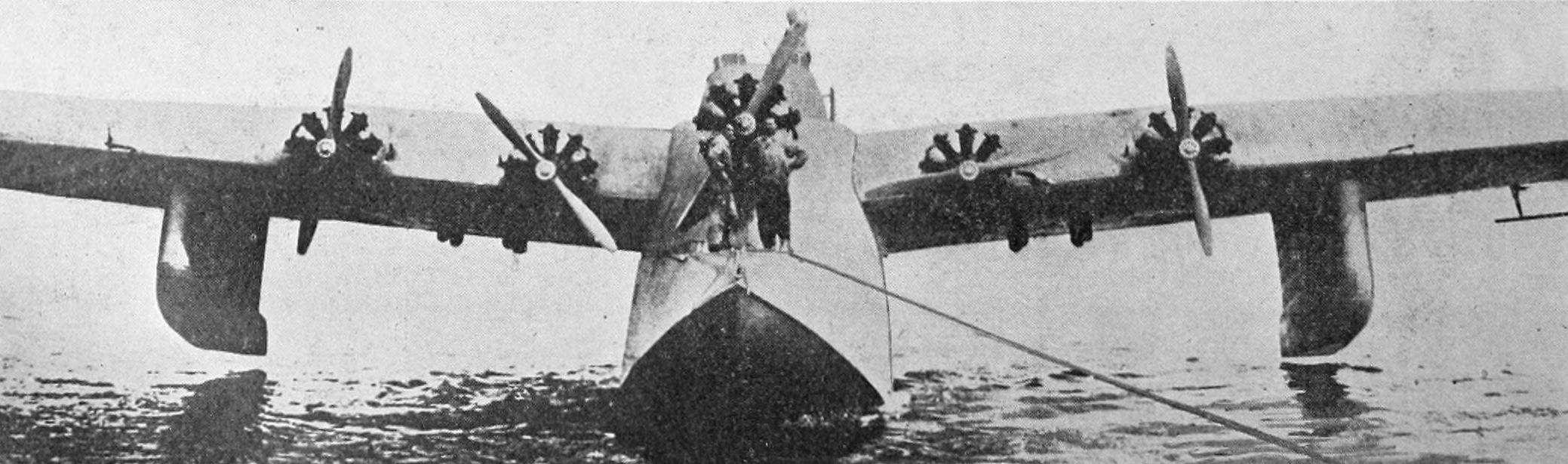
Richard-Penhoët 2 photo from Aero Digest January 1927

The Richard-Penhoët was a monoplane with a three part cantilever wing, each part with the same span and with 5.4° of dihedral. The central panel was rectangular in plan and had a constant thickness/chord ratio of 20%, while the outer panels had symmetrical trapezoidal plans and tapered in thickness outwards to 8%. Wing construction was mixed, largely wooden with wire bracing and with four spruce and ash box spars and spruce and ply ribs. Apart from the leading edge of the central wing, which was covered with corrugated aluminium sheet, the wing was fabric covered. The whole of the trailing edge was filled with ply-covered ailerons.

The hull was also of mixed construction. There were four longerons, the lower ones wooden and the upper ones steel, braced together with bulkheads. Its planing bottom, with a step below mid-wing and a double-curvature section, was constructed from two spruce, mahogany and teak layers, the space between them divided into eight watertight compartments. The sides were birch ply, reinforced nearer the water with teak. Upper and rear parts were fabric covered. Stability on the water was provided by a pair of unstepped floats under the wing, held a little beyond the central section on mountings within completely enclosing fairings. The vertical tail was metal-framed and fabric covered, with an in-flight adjustable, triangular fin and rectangular balanced rudder. The horizontal tail was built like the wing, with an in-flight adjustable, straight-tapered tailplane and narrow chord elevators, mounted on the fin just above the hull.

The pilots sat in an open, side-by-side cockpit on top of the hull, well forward above the wing and fitted with dual control; behind them there was a separate, similar cockpit for flight engineers or navigator. Internally the hull was divided into two decks linked by steps and entered by doors aft of the wing, one to each side of the upper deck. This was reserved for the crew, with sleeping quarters forward under the cockpits and access to most control systems. The windowed passenger cabin was below, with four rows of four seats separated by a central aisle, another two at the front and provision for two more. Behind the passenger cabin there were small cabins for the radio-operator and for the captain, plus toilets and a baggage store.

The large flying boat was power by five 310 kW (420 hp) Gnome-Rhône Jupiter uncowled nine-cylinder radial engines. Four were mounted close to the wing leading edges and the fifth, at the same height, over the bow. Fuel was held in the central wing section, with four tanks on each side. The wing engines could be reached in flight by a walkway with 1.6 m (5 ft 3 in) headroom,

The Richard-Penhoët 2's first flight was in August 1926 and about ten flights were made between 21 August and 9 September, with Duhanel at the controls. Behaviour on take-off and in the air was good but the performance was lower than expected. The trials showed propeller efficiencies were only about 55%, a result ascribed to the closeness (0.6 m (2 ft 0 in)) of their 3.0 m (9 ft 10 in) discs to the wing leading edge, given a wing thickness of 1.8 m (5 ft 11 in). The engines were also ungeared, leading to high tip speeds and their associated inefficiencies.

It was therefore decided to move the engines forward by 2.4 m (7 ft 10 in), provide engine gearing and increase propeller diameters to as much as 4.2 m (13 ft 9 in). The modifications kept the flying boat grounded for a year before restarting flight testing in 1928 but on 26 April, piloted by Victor Lucas, assisted by engineers Denis Provost and Marcel Lecoq and with designer Lewis Quincé observing, it crashed from low altitude into the Loire estuary. Pilot and engineers were rescued but Quincé died. Early reports suggested the fin broke away, taking with it the tailplane and elevators.

== Specifications ==
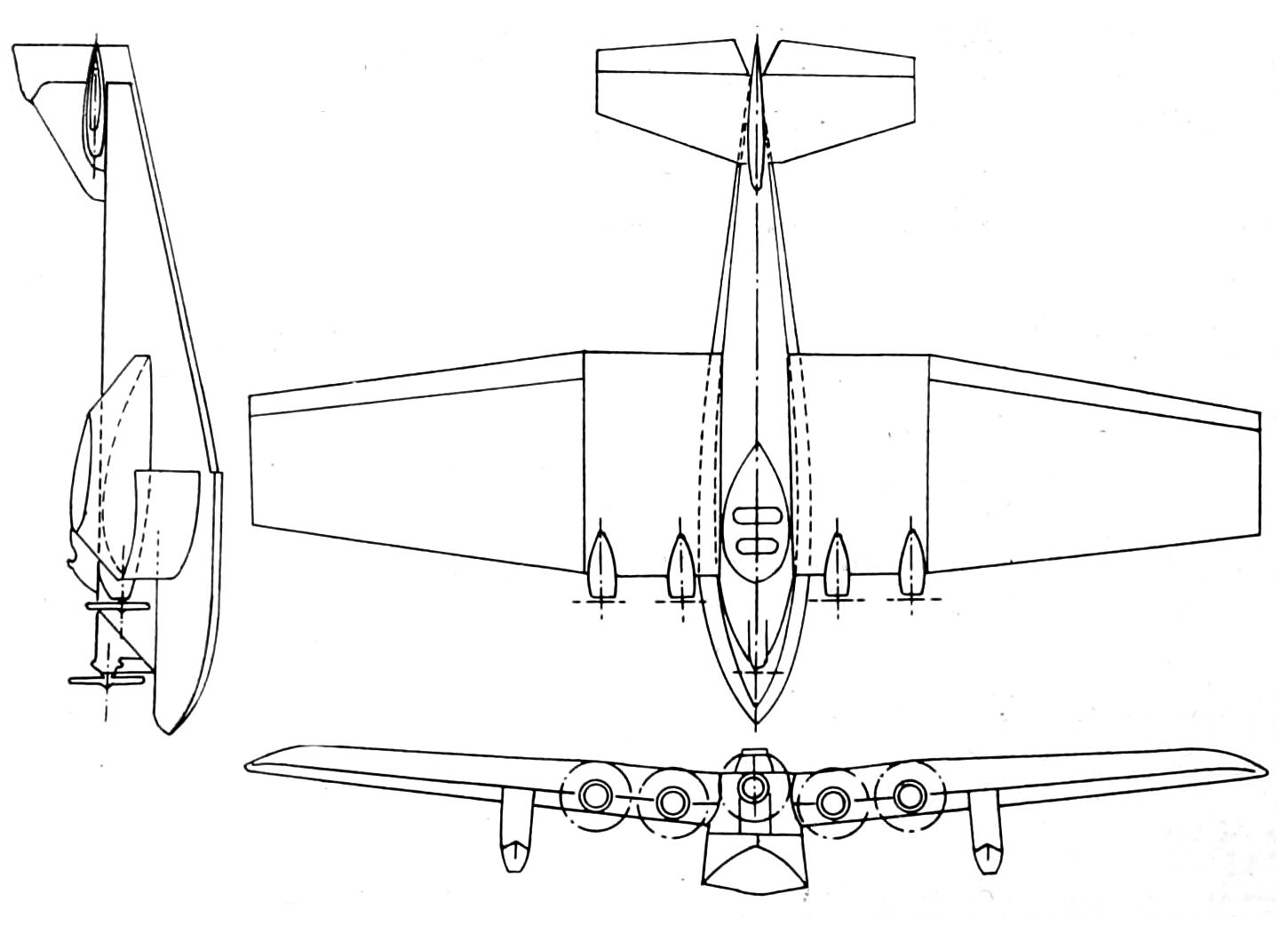
Richard-Penhoët 2 3-view drawing from Aero Digest April 1927

Data from NACA,1927 except where noted

General characteristics

- Crew: Two pilots, two mechanics
- Capacity: Eighteen-twenty passengers
- Length: 27 m (88 ft 7 in)
- Wingspan: 39.75 m (130 ft 5 in)
- Height: 6.50 m (21 ft 4 in)
- Wing area: 270 m^{2} (2,900 sq ft)
- Airfoil: Eiffel 391
- Empty weight: 12,260 kg (27,029 lb)
- Gross weight: 17,500 kg (38,581 lb)
- Fuel capacity: 4,200 L (920 imp gal; 1,100 US gal)
- Powerplant: 5 × Gnome-Rhône Jupiter 9-cylinder radials, 310 kW (420 hp) each
- Propellers: 2-bladed, 3 m (9 ft 10 in) diameter

Performance

- Maximum speed: 160 km/h (99 mph, 86 kn)
- Range: 800 km (500 mi, 430 nmi)
- Endurance: 7 h
- Service ceiling: 3,500 m (11,500 ft)
- Time to altitude: 30 min to 1,200 m (3,900 ft)

== See also ==
Related lists

- List of flying boats and floatplanes
