= Renard R.30 =

R.30

General information
- Type: Airliner
- National origin: Belgium
- Manufacturer: Renard
- Number built: 1

History
- First flight: 1931

The Renard R.30 was a prototype trimotor airliner built in Belgium in 1931. It was a strut-braced high-wing monoplane of conventional design with a fully enclosed flight deck and separate passenger compartment. One engine was mounted on the nose, while the other two were mounted on the leading edges of the wings. Construction was metal throughout, skinned in plywood and fabric.

The R.30 was designed in response to a Belgian government requirement of 1929 for a long-range passenger transport aircraft to service Belgian Congo. The design met the specifications laid down, but by the time it flew in 1931, it was judged already obsolete. The single prototype, registered OO-AMK, was the only example built.

== Specifications ==
Data from Jane's all the World's Aircraft 1931

General characteristics

- Crew: 1
- Capacity: 6 pax
- Length: 10 m (32 ft 10 in)
- Wingspan: 15 m (49 ft 3 in)
- Height: 3.4 m (11 ft 2 in)
- Wing area: 34 m^{2} (370 sq ft)
- Empty weight: 1,167 kg (2,573 lb)
- Gross weight: 2,050 kg (4,519 lb)
- Fuel capacity: 276 kg (608 lb)
- Powerplant: 3 × Renard Type 120 5-cylinder air-cooled radial piston engines, 89 kW (120 hp) each at 1,750 rpm; 100 kW (140 hp) at 1900 rpm for take-off
- Propellers: 2-bladed wooden fixed-pitch propellers, 2.3 m (7 ft 7 in) diameter

Performance

- Maximum speed: 207 km/h (129 mph, 112 kn)
- Stall speed: 95 km/h (59 mph, 51 kn)
- Range: 700 km (430 mi, 380 nmi)
- Service ceiling: 6,100 m (20,000 ft)
- Rate of climb: 4.4 m/s (870 ft/min)
- Time to altitude: 2,000 m (6,600 ft) in 3 minutes
- Wing loading: 60.4 kg/m^{2} (12.4 lb/sq ft)
- Power/mass: 12.5 lb/hp (7.6 kg/kW)
