= RAE Zephyr =

Type of airplane

Zephyr
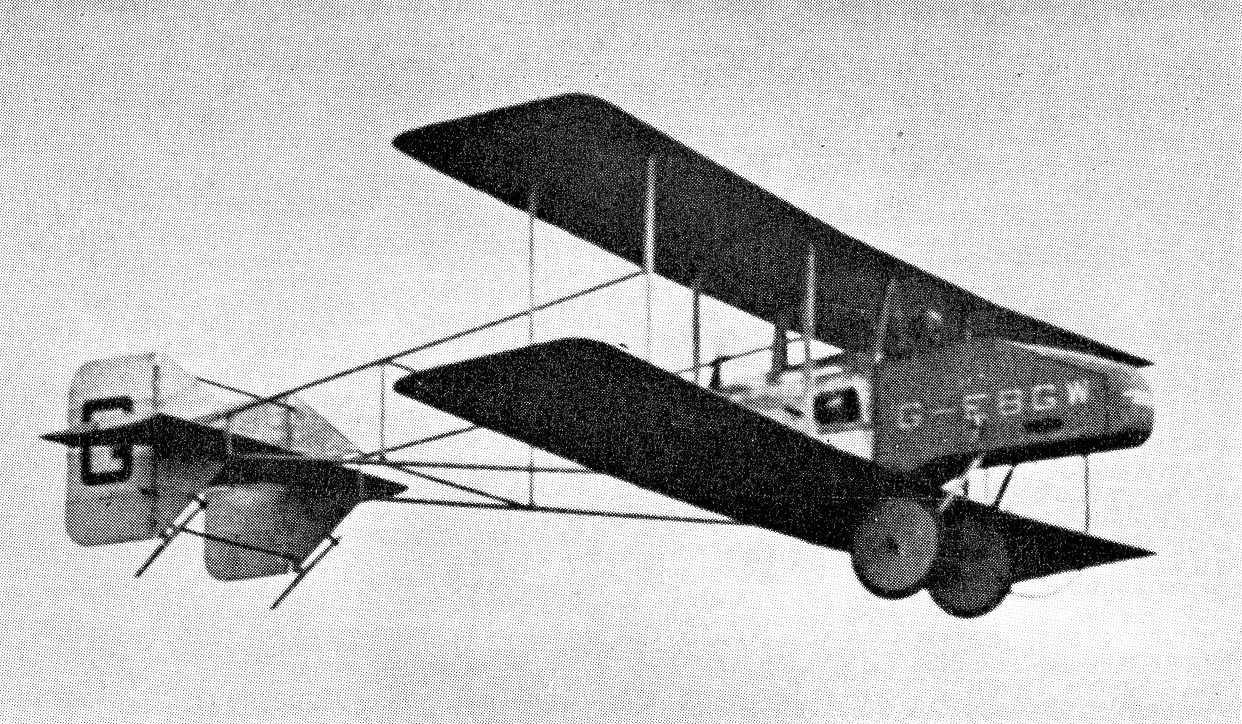

General information
- Type: Light sports aircraft
- National origin: United Kingdom
- Manufacturer: Aero Club of the Royal Aircraft Establishment
- Designer: Samuel Childs
- Number built: 1

History
- First flight: 3 September 1923

The RAE Zephyr was a single-seat, single-engined light pusher configuration biplane designed and built by the Aero Club of the Royal Aircraft Establishment (RAE) for the 1923 Lympne Motor Glider Competition. At a late stage the Aero Club chose to enter the more promising RAE Hurricane instead, using the Zephyr's engine, and the Zephyr itself was abandoned.

== Design and development ==
The Zephyr was the first of three light aircraft designed and built by the Aero Club of the RAE. It was designed by Samuel Childs. As the Club originally considered it as an entrant to the Lympne Motor Glider Competition where the Daily Mail prize of £1000 for a 50-mile flight was limited to aircraft with engines of less than 750 cc capacity, it was fitted with a 600 cc Douglas flat-twin engine that produced only about 20 hp (15 kW).

The Zephyr was a two bay biplane with wings without stagger or sweep and of constant chord with square tips. It was a pusher design, reminiscent of the Royal Aircraft Factory F.E series, for example the FE8, with a full fuselage replaced with a pod or nacelle with the cockpit and the engine behind it, the empennage supported on an open frame. The Zephyr's pilot sat under the front wing with a long but downward sloping nose ahead of him. Four booms ran rearwards from the wings, two on each side converging in the vertical plane from the inner interplane struts to the tail, with rectangular bracing to stiffen them. The tailplane was mounted at the meeting of the booms and twin triangular fins, each bearing a near rectangular rudder were placed at the ends of each vertical pair of booms. The twin-wheeled main undercarriage was supplemented by twin sprung tails skids, one under each fin.

The Zephyr flew for the first time with Paul Bulman in control on 3 September 1923, with just over a month before the start of the Lympne Trials on 8 October. It was certainly later than intended, for the Zephyr had been registered as a competitor in the Vauvilles (near Cherbourg) Light Plane and Glider event which ended on 26 August. The first flight went well, and Bulman reported excellent handling. However, by this time the Aero Club had designed and built the much more modern looking Hurricane, a cantilever monoplane with less air resistance and slightly lower weight, though no lightweight. The Zephyr was therefore even more underpowered than the Hurricane, and it was decided to put the Douglas engine into the latter aircraft and enter it for the trials. The wing area of the biplane was more than three times that of the Hurricane, making for such a low wing loading (2.54 b/sq. ft. or 12.4 kg/m^{2}) that the Zephyr would have been hard to fly except in a dead calm. With the loss of its engine the sole Zephyr, registered G-EBGW was abandoned, though not destroyed until 1925.

== Specifications ==
Data from Ord-Hume 2000, p. 454

General characteristics

- Crew: 1
- Wingspan: 29 ft 0 in (8.84 m)
- Height: 8 ft 2 in (2.49 m)
- Empty weight: 400 lb (181 kg)
- Gross weight: 635 lb (288 kg)
- Powerplant: 1 × 600 cc Douglas flat twin , 17 hp (13 kW)

Performance

- Maximum speed: 52.5 mph (84.5 km/h, 45.6 kn) Ord-Hume gives range 50-55 mph
- Cruise speed: 45 mph (72 km/h, 39 kn)
- Range: 220 mi (350 km, 190 nmi)
