= Rayner Pusher =

Pusher

General information
- Type: Homebuilt aircraft
- National origin: United States
- Designer: Herb Rayner

History
- Developed from: Curtiss Model D

The Rayner Pusher is a homebuilt version of the Curtiss Pusher.

== Design and development ==
The Rayner Pusher is a single-seat, tricycle landing gear-equipped biplane with a pusher engine layout. The fuselage is welded steel tubing. The wings are fabric covered on top surfaces only. It uses a fuel tank mounted above the top wing.

== Specifications ==
Data from EAA., Air Trails Summer 1971

General characteristics

- Crew: 1
- Length: 17 ft (5.2 m)
- Wingspan: 21 ft (6.4 m)
- Height: 7 ft (2.1 m)
- Wing area: 140 sq ft (13 m^{2})
- Empty weight: 600 lb (272 kg)
- Gross weight: 950 lb (431 kg)
- Fuel capacity: 10 gal
- Powerplant: 1 × Continental A-65 horizontally-opposed piston aircraft engine, 65 hp (48 kW)
- Propellers: 2-bladed

Performance

- Maximum speed: 65 kn (75 mph, 121 km/h)
- Cruise speed: 56 kn (65 mph, 105 km/h)
- Stall speed: 30 kn (35 mph, 56 km/h)
- Range: 160 nmi (180 mi, 290 km)
- Service ceiling: 8,000 ft (2,400 m)
- Rate of climb: 600 ft/min (3.0 m/s)

== See also ==
Aircraft of comparable role, configuration, and era

- Curtiss Model D
- RLU-1 Breezy
