= Rossi Shuttle Quik =

Italian ultralight trike

Shuttle Quik

General information
- Type: Ultralight trike
- National origin: Italy
- Manufacturer: Rossi Soavi Paolo
- Designer: Paolo Rossi
- Status: Production completed (2012)

The Rossi Shuttle Quik is an Italian ultralight trike that was designed by Paolo Rossi and produced by Rossi Soavi Paolo of Camposanto. When it was available the aircraft was supplied as custom-built, ready-to-fly-aircraft.

The company appears to be out of business and production of the design completed.

== Design and development ==
The Shuttle Quik was designed to comply with the Fédération Aéronautique Internationale microlight category, including the category's maximum gross weight of 450 kg (992 lb). Each Rossi aircraft was built to order, but a typical Shuttle Quik has a maximum gross weight of 409 kg (902 lb). It features a cable-braced P&M Quik hang glider-style high-wing, weight-shift controls, a two-seats-in-tandem open cockpit with a cockpit fairing, tricycle landing gear with wheel pants and a single engine in pusher configuration.

The aircraft is made from bolted-together aluminum tubing, with its double surface wing covered in Dacron sailcloth. Its 8.0 m (26.2 ft) span wing is supported by a single tube-type kingpost and uses an "A" frame weight-shift control bar. The powerplant is a four-stroke, 150 hp (112 kW) RM engine or a four-cylinder, air and liquid-cooled, four-stroke, dual-ignition 100 hp (75 kW) Rotax 912ULS engine.

P&M Aviation do not normally supply wings to other manufacturers, but they had a longstanding relationship with Rossi that made them confident to do so in his case.

With the 150 hp (112 kW) RM powerplant, the Shuttle Quik may be the most powerful ultralight trike flown.

== Specifications (Shuttle Quik) ==
Data from Bayerl

General characteristics

- Crew: one
- Capacity: one passenger
- Wingspan: 8.0 m (26 ft 3 in)
- Wing area: 10.6 m^{2} (114 sq ft)
- Gross weight: 409 kg (902 lb)
- Fuel capacity: 46 litres (10 imp gal; 12 US gal)
- Powerplant: 1 × Rotax 912ULS four cylinder, liquid and air-cooled, four stroke aircraft engine or twin cylinder, liquid-cooled, two stroke aircraft engine, 75 kW (101 hp)
- Propellers: 3-bladed composite

Performance

- Maximum speed: 168 km/h (104 mph, 91 kn)
- Cruise speed: 132 km/h (82 mph, 71 kn)
- Stall speed: 61 km/h (38 mph, 33 kn)
- Rate of climb: 5 m/s (980 ft/min)
- Wing loading: 38.6 kg/m^{2} (7.9 lb/sq ft)
