= Replogle Gold Bug =

Gold Bug

General information
- Type: Homebuilt aircraft
- National origin: United States
- Designer: Merle Replogle

The Replogle Gold Bug is an American single engine, cantilevered high wing aircraft with conventional landing gear that was designed by Merle Replogle for homebuilt construction.

== Operational history ==
In 1991, the prototype was restored with the original VW engine.

== Specifications (Gold Bug) ==
Data from Air Progress

General characteristics

- Crew: one
- Powerplant: 1 × Volkswagen air-cooled engine
