= Rad Aviation =

British aircraft manufacturer

- Company type: Privately held company
- Industry: Aerospace
- Founded: 1989
- Founder: John Radford
- Defunct: 2006
- Fate: Out of business
- Headquarters: Kidlington, United Kingdom
- Products: Paramotors

Rad Aviation was a British aircraft manufacturer based in Kidlington. The company was formed by John Radford and specialized in the design and manufacture of paramotors in the form of ready-to-fly aircraft for the European microlight rules.

The company was founded in 1989 as a powered paragliding research and development enterprise, producing their first production paramotor in 1995. By 2006 they reported that they had shipped more than 450 paramotors, selling mostly in the UK and Europe, plus the Middle East. The company went out of business in about 2006.

The company focus was on very lightweight paramotors with low-powered engines. Designs produced included the Rad Arrow, MXL, RXL and the SXL Custom.

== Aircraft ==
Summary of aircraft built by Rad Aviation
Model name	First flight	Number built	Type
Rad Arrow	mid-2000s		paramotor
Rad MXL	mid-2000s		paramotor
Rad RXL	mid-2000s		paramotor
Rad SXL Custom	mid-2000s		paramotor
