= Richard TOM-1 =

General information
- Type: Torpedo bomber
- National origin: Soviet Union
- Designer: Paul Richard
- Status: Cancelled
- Number built: 1

History
- First flight: 1 January 1931

The Richard TOM-1 was a prototype torpedo-carrying floatplane that was designed in the Soviet Union in the early 1930s that was not accepted for production. It was a mid-wing monoplane, with twin engines, and twin floats. The empennage consisted of a single tail-plane and three vertical fins.

== Specifications (variant specified) ==
Data from The Osprey Encyclopedia of Soviet Aircraft, 1875–1995

General characteristics

- Crew: 3
- Length: 19 m (62 ft 4 in)
- Wingspan: 33 m (108 ft 3 in)
- Wing area: 120 m^{2} (1,300 sq ft)
- Empty weight: 4,929 kg (10,867 lb)
- Gross weight: 8,030 kg (17,703 lb)
- Fuel capacity: 1,300 kg (2,900 lb)
- Powerplant: 2 × BMW VI water-cooled V-12, 510 kW (680 hp) each

Performance

- Maximum speed: 210 km/h (130 mph, 110 kn) @ sealevel
- Cruise speed: 171 km/h (106 mph, 92 kn)
- Range: 1,500 km (930 mi, 810 nmi)
- Service ceiling: 5,500 m (18,000 ft)

Armament

- Guns: 3 × 7.62 mm (0.3 in) PV-1 machine guns
- Bombs: 1 × torpedo

== Bibliography ==
- Gunston, Bill (1995). The Osprey Encyclopedia of Russian Aircraft 1875–1995. London: Osprey. ISBN 1-85532-405-9.
- Kotelnikov, V.; Kulikov, V. & Cony, C. (December 2001). "Les avions français en URSS, 1921–1941" [French Aircraft in the USSR, 1921–1941]. Avions: Toute l'Aéronautique et son histoire (in French) (105): 50–56. ISSN 1243-8650.
