= Alliance P.1 =

General information
- Type: Training biplane
- National origin: United Kingdom
- Manufacturer: Alliance Aeroplane Company
- Designer: James Arthur Peters
- Number built: 1

History
- First flight: 1919
- Developed from: Ruffy-Baumann R.A.B.15

The Alliance P.1 was a British single-engined training biplane re-designed by J.A. Peters from the Ruffy-Baumann R.A.B.15 for the Alliance Aeroplane Company.

== Design and development ==
The Alliance Aeroplane Company which had constructed aircraft under licence during the First World War decided to build aircraft for the civil market. They took over the Ruffy, Arnell and Baumann Aviation Company and acquired the Ruffy-Baumann R.A.B.15 training biplane. The R.A.B.15 had been built in 1918 and was powered by an 80 hp (60 kW) Renault piston engine. Peters re-designed the aircraft mainly adding a horn balanced rudder and he improved the landing gear and it was re-designated the Alliance P.1. The aircraft was scrapped in November 1920.
