= Righton Big Wing =

New Zealand glider

Big Wing
- The partially disassembled Righton Big Wing, circa 2015

General information
- Type: Glider
- National origin: New Zealand
- Manufacturer: Douglas Huntly Righton
- Number built: 1

History
- Introduction date: 1960s

The Big Wing was the name given to a large glider designed and built by Douglas Huntly Righton during the 1950s and 60s.

== Design and development ==
Righton was a farmer from Ruawai in Northland, New Zealand. In 1931 he had been granted a patent for a variable incidence wing design. Design of his glider is believed to have begun in the early 1950s, with construction lasting through to the late 1960s.

The glider was a cantilevered parasol-wing monoplane of conventional configuration, notable for its large wingspan of 22 m (72 ft). The incidence of both the main wing and the tailplane could be adjusted in flight. The fuselage was a simple slab-sided design and had a box-like cross-section. A long boom, extending from the nose of the glider, was fitted with a movable counterweight, allowing the glider's centre of gravity to be adjusted in flight.

== Operational history ==
The Big Wing was never completed and did not undergo any flight tests. The glider had been stored in a series of rural barns and only came to public attention in 2015 when it was offered for sale through an online auction website. Its current whereabouts is unknown.

== Specifications ==
Data from VGC News

General characteristics

- Crew: two
- Wingspan: 22 m (72 ft 2 in)

Performance
