= Ritter Special =

Special

General information
- Type: Homebuilt aircraft
- National origin: United States
- Designer: Riter

History
- First flight: 1961

The Riter Special is an American Homebuilt aircraft design.

== Design and development ==
The Riter special is a single engine, low wing, single seat, retractable conventional landing gear aircraft. The wings fold upward for ground transport on a trailer. The landing gear is retracted by hand with a worm-gear mechanism.

== Specifications (Riter Special) ==
Data from Air Progress

General characteristics

- Crew: one
- Powerplant: 1 × Lycoming GPU

Performance

- Maximum speed: 170 kn (200 mph, 320 km/h)
- Cruise speed: 150 kn (170 mph, 270 km/h)

== See also ==
Aircraft of comparable role, configuration, and era

- Midget Mustang
