= Rabouyt D2 =

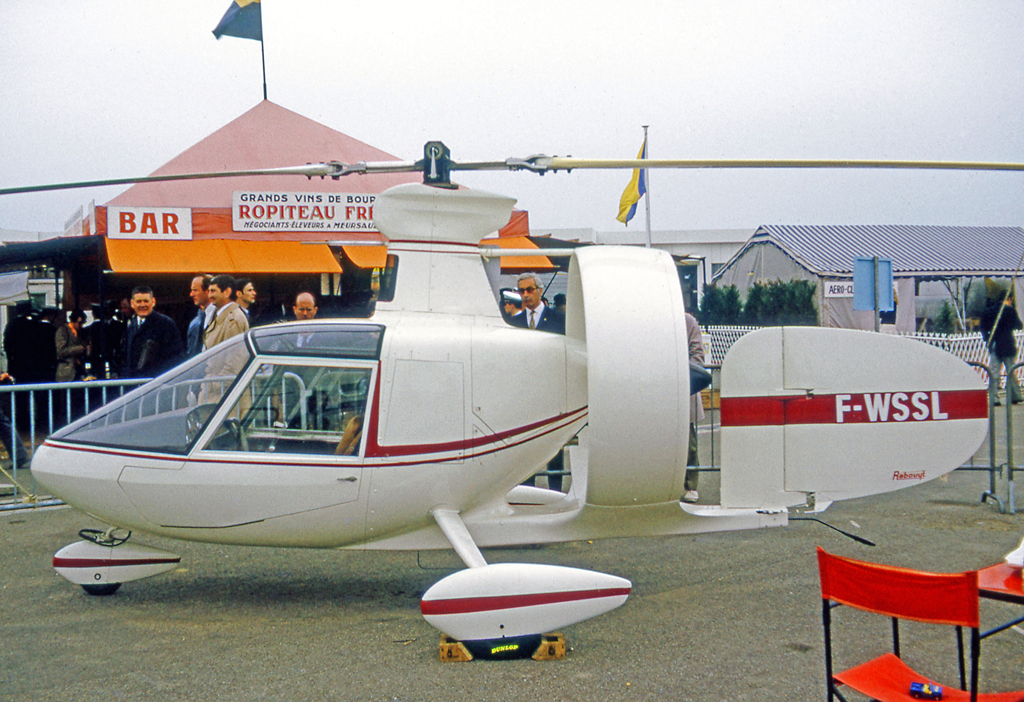
- The prototype Rabouyt D2 "Heliplane" displayed at the June 1971 Paris Air Show.

General information
- Type: Two seat hybrid helicopter/autogyro
- National origin: France
- Manufacturer: Rabouyt
- Number built: 1

History
- Introduction date: 1971

The Rabouyt D2 was a two-seat autogyro, with an engine driven rotor for vertical take-offs. In level flight the aircraft was powered by the same engine driving a shrouded, pusher configuration propeller. It was designed and built in France in the early 1970s by Denis Rabouyt.

== Design and development ==
The D2 was primarily an autogyro driven by a pusher configuration, shrouded propeller whilst supported by an autorotating undriven two blade rotor. It was unusual in that the rotor could be powered, by the same engine that drove the propeller, during a vertical take-off phase to overcome the autogyro's normal limiting need for a take-off run.

The D2's main rotor had constant chord blades of laminated wood, covered with geodesic glass fibre fabric. They were pillar mounted, together with a torque limiting coupler, at mid fuselage between the cabin and engine compartment. The fuselage was a steel-chromium-vanadium pod, with two side by side seats in a cabin glazed to the nose and accessed by a forward opening door on each side. The pusher configuration engine was mounted behind the cabin, driving a four blade propeller turning within a circular, aerofoil shroud supported by a ventral pod extension and braced to the rotor pillar. A vertical tail consisting of a small fin and large rudder was mounted on a boom from the lower fuselage. The D2 landed on a fixed tricycle undercarriage, each wheel within a streamlined fairing on a cantilever leg. The nosewheel was steerable via the rudder pedals.

The Rabouyt D2 first appeared in public at the Paris Air Show of 1971, though it is not known if the aircraft had flown by this date. For early testing it was fitted with a low powered engine which was being replaced in early 1973 by a 150 hp flat-four of unspecified type. It is not known if it was flown.

== Specifications ==
Data from Jane's All the World's Aircraft 1974-75 All performance figures are estimates at the maximum take-off weight.

General characteristics

- Crew: Two
- Length: 5.29 m (17 ft 4 in) without rotors
- Width: 2.36 m (7 ft 9 in) overall
- Height: 2.45 m (8 ft 0 in) overall
- Max takeoff weight: 750 kg (1,653 lb)
- Powerplant: 1 × flat-four , 110 kW (150 hp)
- Main rotor diameter: 10.00 m (32 ft 10 in)
- Main rotor area: 78.5 m^{2} (845 sq ft) two blade
- Propellers: 4-bladed shrouded

Performance

- Cruise speed: 180 km/h (110 mph, 97 kn)
- Minimum control speed: 30 km/h (19 mph, 16 kn)
- Range: 720 km (450 mi, 390 nmi)
