= Rand-Robinson KR-3 =

KR-3

General information
- Type: Homebuilt aircraft
- National origin: United States
- Designer: Ken Rand

History
- Introduction date: 1977

The Rand-Robinson KR-3 is an American amphibious aircraft that was designed by Ken Rand.

== Design and development ==
The KR-3 is a two-seat composite construction amphibious aircraft. The landing gear is hydraulically retractable. The prototype was demonstrated at the EAA airshow in 1977, demonstrating water taxi tests.

== Specifications (KR-3) ==
Data from Flight International

General characteristics

- Crew: 1
- Capacity: 1 passenger
- Powerplant: 1 × Volkswagen air-cooled engine horizontally opposed piston

Performance

== See also ==
Related development

- Rand Robinson KR-1

Aircraft of comparable role, configuration, and era

- Icon A5
