= Replica Plans SE.5a =

General information
- Type: Homebuilt biplane
- National origin: Canada
- Manufacturer: Replica Plans
- Number built: 120+

History
- First flight: 1970

The Replica Plans SE.5a is a Canadian designed biplane for amateur construction from Replica Plans. Designed as a 7/8 size (87.5%) replica of the first world war Royal Aircraft Factory SE.5. The prototype first flew in 1970 and is built of wood and fabric and can use engines from 65 to 125 hp. Estimated construction time is 2500 hours. Most aircraft are painted to represent SE5 aircraft flown in The Great War.

== Specifications ==
Data from Kiwi Aircraft Images

General characteristics

- Crew: 1
- Length: 18 ft 2 in (5.54 m)
- Wingspan: 23 ft 4 in (7.11 m)
- Height: 7 ft 8 in (2.34 m)
- Empty weight: 750 lb (341 kg)
- Gross weight: 1,150 lb (522 kg)
- Powerplant: 1 × Continental O-200 , 85 hp (63 kW)

Performance

- Maximum speed: 110 mph (176 km/h, 96 kn)
- Range: 250 mi (400 km, 220 nmi)
- Service ceiling: 10,000 ft (3,048 m)
- Rate of climb: 900 ft/min (4.6 m/s)

== See also ==
Related development

- Royal Aircraft Factory SE.5
