= Roll Flight =

German aircraft manufacturer

- Company type: Privately held company
- Industry: Aerospace
- Founder: Martin Rütter
- Fate: Out of business
- Headquarters: Schwelm, Germany
- Products: Powered parachutes

Roll Flight was a German aircraft manufacturer founded by Martin Rütter based in Schwelm. The company specialized in the design and manufacture of powered parachutes in the form of ready-to-fly aircraft for the European Fédération Aéronautique Internationale microlight category.

Active in the mid-2000s period, the company started building steel tube cages for paramotors as its first product. This then expanded into producing entire powered parachute carriage units which could then be mated with one of a number of parachute wings. The company produced the Roll Flight MR V as a single-seater that could be converted into a two-seater and was then called the Duo.

== Aircraft ==
Summary of aircraft built by Roll Flight
Model name	First flight	Number built	Type
Roll Flight MR V	2000s		one or two seat powered parachute
