= Rubik R-03 Szittya I =

Hungarian single-seat sailplane

Szittya I
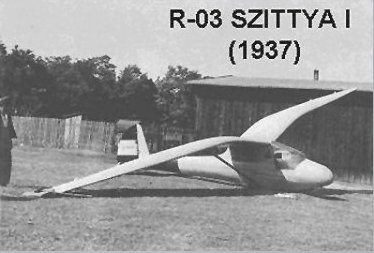

General information
- Type: sailplane
- National origin: Hungary
- Manufacturer: MOVERO workshop, Esztergom
- Designer: Ernő Rubik
- Number built: Three, one of each variant.

History
- First flight: August 1937

The Rubik R-03 Szittya I (Scythian I) was a Hungarian single-seat sailplane flown in the late 1930s. The design was developed through three improving variants. though only one of each was built.

== Design and development ==
Ernő Rubik began the design of the R-03 Szittya to meet a Hungarian club call for a motor glider, intending to strut-mount the engine in pusher configuration over the central fuselage. Financial problems prevented purchase of the engine and the aircraft was completed as a conventional glider, named the Szittya I. Its first flight was in August 1937 and, after a testing programme begun in September, it was cleared for basic aerobatics.

The Szittya I's gull wing was mounted on a fuselage pedestal and was built around a single spar which, with plywood covering ahead of it around the leading edge, formed a torsion-resistant D-box. Behind the main spar and the central, diagonal drag struts the wing was fabric covered. The inner halves of the span were rectangular in plan, each with a central part with 14° of dihedral and an outer part with no dihedral. These were braced from the fuselage keel with a single strut on each side to the spar. The outer wings had swept leading edges and semi-elliptic trailing edges entirely filled with the ailerons.

The semi-monocoque fuselage of the Szittya was an oval section, ply structure built around frames and stringers. It was deepest under the wing, with an enclosed cockpit ahead of the leading edge. The cockpit cover was plywood, with small, flat, celluloid windows. A rubber-sprung landing skid ran from nose to under mid-chord. Aft, the fuselage depth reduced a little to the tail, where the ply-covered fin carried a fabric-covered, curved rudder. The elliptical plan horizontal tail had a tailplane similar in structure to the wing and fabric-covered elevators. It was mounted directly on top of the fuselage, far enough forward to clear the rudder.

In the summer of 1938 a revised version, the R-04 Szittya II, flew. The cockpit cover, though still with ply frames, had much larger windows and hence a much improved view. As a result of these changes the Szittya II was 160 mm (6.30 in) longer. Later in its life the cockpit was modified further with a longer transparency. The trailing edge of the wing pedestal, rather abrupt on the Szittya I, was faired into the fuselage with a short extension, and the horizontal tail was lifted a little above the fuselage on a new pedestal. Apart from the small length change, the specifications were the same as those of its predecessor.

The R-10 Szittya III was the final variant and was also first flown in 1938. The wing span was increased by 1 m (3 ft 3 in) and its area by 4%. The dihedral of the inner panels was reduced and the plan changed by new, longer ailerons with straight edges. The wing was no longer pedestal-mounted but placed directly upon a remodelled, raised fuselage which tapered gradually aft. The tailplane pedestal was raised and the tailplane plan changed from elliptical to tetragonal with rounded tips. The rudder was also redesigned, with an aerodynamic balance and an increase in chord. Overall, the Szittya III's fuselage was 150 mm (5.91 in) longer than that of the Szittya II. These changes improved the minimum sinking speed to 0.7 m/s (2.3 ft/s) at 60 km/h (37 mph; 32 kn).

The single Szittya III was destroyed in a hangar fire in 1940.

== Variants ==
R-03 Szittya I
Original aircraft. One built.
R-04 Szittya II
Revised nose and cockpit cover, small length increase, faired wing pedestal and raised tailplane.
R-10 Szittya III
Longer span wings with less inner dihedral and wing mounted directly onto revised, smoothly tapered fuselage. Improved canopy, raised, straight tapered tailplane and balanced rudder.

== Specifications (R-03 Szittya I) ==
Data from Hungarian gliders 1933-2000

General characteristics

- Crew: One
- Length: 6 m (19 ft 8 in)
- Wingspan: 15 m (49 ft 3 in)
- Wing area: 15 m^{2} (160 sq ft)
- Aspect ratio: 15
- Empty weight: 140 kg (309 lb)
- Gross weight: 240 kg (529 lb)

Performance

- Maximum speed: 200 km/h (120 mph, 110 kn) never exceed speed
- Stall speed: 45 km/h (28 mph, 24 kn)
- Maximum glide ratio: 20.8
- Rate of sink: 0.77 m/s (152 ft/min) minimum, at 55 km/h (34 mph; 30 kn)
- Maximum aerotow speed:100 km/h (62 mph; 54 kn)
