= Renard R.17 =

Unreleased 20th century motorplane

General information
- Type: Four-seat cabin monoplane
- National origin: Belgium
- Manufacturer: Constructions Aéronautiques G. Renard
- Designer: Georges Renard
- Number built: 1

History
- First flight: 1931

The Renard R.17 was a Belgian four-seat cabin monoplane designed and built by Constructions Aéronautiques G. Renard. The high cantilever wing was an unusual feature when most contemporary aircraft still had braced wings. Designed as a high-speed transport for fresh flowers, no aircraft were ordered and the only R.17 was retained by the company until 1946.

== Specifications ==
Data from Jane's all the World's Aircraft 1931

General characteristics

- Crew: 1
- Capacity: 3 pax
- Length: 6.8 m (22 ft 4 in)
- Wingspan: 9.8 m (32 ft 2 in)
- Height: 2.4 m (7 ft 10 in)
- Wing area: 18 m^{2} (190 sq ft)
- Empty weight: 525 kg (1,157 lb)
- Gross weight: 925 kg (2,039 lb)
- Fuel capacity: 120 L (32 US gal; 26 imp gal)
- Powerplant: 1 × Renard Type 120 5-cylinder air-cooled radial piston engine, 89 kW (120 hp)
- Propellers: 2-bladed fixed pitch wooden propeller

Performance

- Maximum speed: 165 km/h (103 mph, 89 kn)
- Stall speed: 72 km/h (45 mph, 39 kn)
- Service ceiling: 4,000 m (13,000 ft)
- Time to altitude: 2,000 m (6,600 ft) in 12 minutes
- Wing loading: 50 kg/m^{2} (10 lb/sq ft)
- Power/mass: 16.9 lb/hp (10.3 kg/kW)
