= Renard R.33 =

General information
- Type: Trainer aircraft
- National origin: Belgium
- Manufacturer: Constructions Aéronautiques G. Renard
- Number built: 2

History
- First flight: 1934

The Renard R.33 was a Belgian training aircraft with aerobatic capability. Two were flown in 1934 but no more were produced.

== Design ==
When the Renard R.33 design was begun, it was intended as a touring aircraft but as it progressed it became apparent that a more suitable rôle was as a trainer for military reserve pilots and crew. The R.33 allowed pilots to develop their aerobatics and the crew their navigational skills.

It was a parasol wing monoplane, its wings braced to the lower fuselage with streamlined steel tube V-struts. The centre of the wing, thinner than the outer parts, was close to the fuselage and was braced there on short cabane struts. The plan was roughly elliptical, though the leading edge was straight over about half the span and there was a deep, rounded cut-out in the trailing edge to improve the pilot's field of view. There was no dihedral. The wing was all wood, built around a pair of box spars 600 mm (24 in) apart and plywood covered. Its ailerons occupied almost 60% of the span.

The R.33's fuselage was a slender steel tube structure, flat sided though with a rounded upper decking. Its pointed nose partially exposed the five cylinders of the 89 kW (120 hp) Renard 120 radial engine. Engine and cockpit areas were covered with metal and the rest with fabric. A long forward fuselage provided a space between engine and cockpits for fuel tanks and baggage. The tandem open cockpits were raised enough for the pilots to be able to see both above and below the wing. Dual controls were fitted, though the forward set could be removed for a passenger. The empennage was conventional, with balanced control surfaces; the fin was small, with a large, rounded rudder that extended to the keel and the tailplane, mounted at mid-fuselage height and braced from below with two struts on each side, was far enough forward to keep the elevators clear of the rudder.

The Renard had a fixed undercarriage with two mainwheels with axles on V-struts from the central lower fuselage. Faired 1,500 mm (59 in) long oleo struts were attached to the upper fuselage. The wheels had cable brakes; the pilot could choose to use them differentially operation for steering on the ground. There was a steel spring tailskid which could castor freely.

== Development ==
The exact date of the first flight of the Renard R.33 is not known but it was probably in the early summer of 1934. Apart from the Les Ailes article, there are no references to this Belgian aircraft in the contemporary Anglo-French aviation press. A reconstructed Belgian civil aircraft register shows two examples, the first (OO-ANT) registered on 1 May 1934 and the second (OO-ANV) on 10 August 1934. The first, which had two registered owners after leaving Renard, had the Renard 120 uncowled engine but the second, which stayed with the company, had a wide chord, NACA type cowling as well as faired mainwheels. At one time this aircraft was fitted with a 89 kW (120 hp) ADC Cirrus Hermes I four cylinder, upright inline.

== Specifications (Renard 120 engine) ==
Data from Les Ailes 1934

General characteristics

- Crew: Two
- Length: 7.40 m (24 ft 3 in)
- Wingspan: 12.00 m (39 ft 4 in)
- Height: 2.45 m (8 ft 0 in)
- Wing area: 18.50 m^{2} (199.1 sq ft)
- Aspect ratio: 7.8
- Empty weight: 520 kg (1,146 lb)
- Gross weight: 795 kg (1,753 lb) with normal fuel capacity
- Fuel capacity: normal 110 L (24 imp gal; 29 US gal),400 L (88 imp gal; 110 US gal) with supplementary tank
- Powerplant: 1 × Renard 120 5-cylinder radial, 89 kW (120 hp) at 1,800 rpm
- Propellers: 2-bladed

Performance

- Maximum speed: 195 km/h (121 mph, 105 kn) at ground level
- Cruise speed: 165 km/h (103 mph, 89 kn) at 70% power
- Minimum control speed: 65 km/h (40 mph, 35 kn)
- Endurance: 4 hr with normal fuel, 15 hr with supplementary tank
- Service ceiling: 5,750 m (18,860 ft)
- Time to altitude: 75 s to 360 km/h (220 mph)
