= Rubik R-07 Vöcsök =

Vöcsök
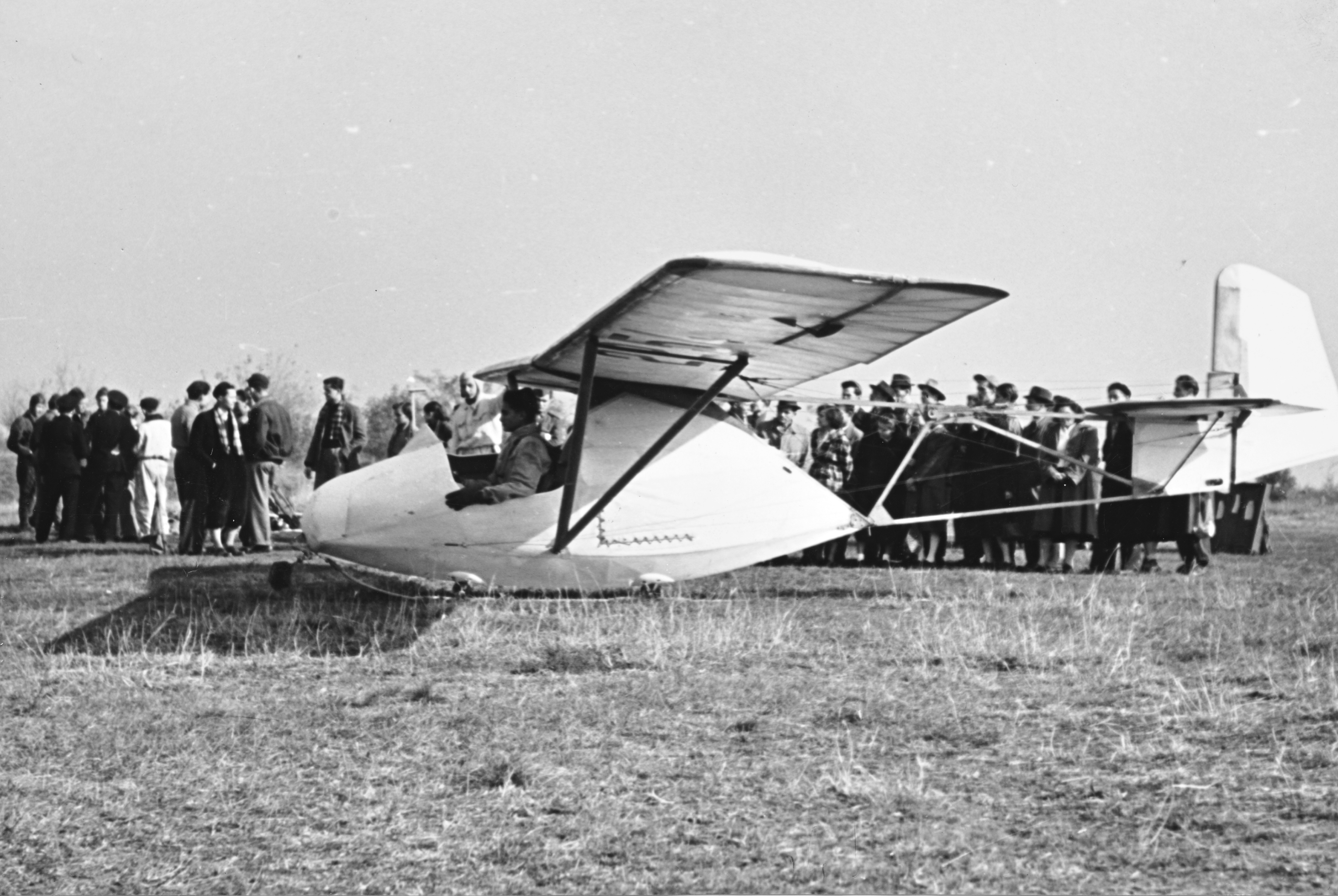
- R-07b Vöcsök

General information
- Type: Primary glider
- National origin: Hungary
- Manufacturer: Aero Ever Kft, Esztergom
- Designer: Ernő Rubik
- Number built: c.350 Vöcsök and 178 Tücsök

History
- First flight: 1 October 1937

The Rubik R-07a Tücsök (Cicada) and R-07b Vöcsök (Grebe) were two versions of a Hungarian primary trainer, differing most obviously in the pilot's seating. First flown in the late 1930s, about 530 were built, some remaining in service into the 1960s.

== Design and development ==
The first primary glider designed and built by the MSrE (Müegyetemi Sportrepülő Egyesület or in English the Technical University's Sports Flying Group) was the EMESE-B. It was designed to have better performance than existing examples of this class but did not prove popular. One of its designers was Ernő Rubik who used this experience to produce the R-05 Vöcsök, a simpler, lower performance aircraft. Like the EMESE-B it was a typical open frame (uncovered flat girder fuselage) glider with its wing mounted on top of the girder and strut-braced. This prototype proved very successful. Production aircraft were designated R-07 with the name Vöcsök if the pilot's seat was enclosed within a nacelle as it had been on the EMESE-B. R-07s with the seat completely exposed had the name Tücsök. This naming convention was maintained through the R-06 Csóvöcsök, a later, one-off tube (csó) steel fuselage version.

The R-07 models, whether Vöcsöks or Tücsöks, were all-wood aircraft, with a wing built around two spars and rectangular in plan out to blunted tips. Because the nacelle increased the empty weight of the Vöcsök by 20 kg (44 lb) (22%) it needed a 1.2 m (3 ft 11 in) longer span wing with a 13% greater area than the Tücsök. The forward spar was close to the plywood-covered leading edge and the rest of the wing was fabric-covered. Broad chord ailerons filled the outer 40% of the span. The post-war R-07D Vöcsök introduced Frise ailerons. The wing was braced with streamlined steel V-struts to the lower fuselage.

A flat, wooden, diagonally-braced girder formed the fuselage of all R-07s, with a deepened, ply-covered forward lower chord, longeron or keel which supported the wing struts, the pilot's seat and controls and, on its underside, a rubber sprung landing skid. On Vöcsöks the keel also supported a ply nacelle which enclosed the pilot, with fabric covering behind it to the first diagonal fuselage member. The nacelle lengthened the Vöcsök by 300 mm (11.8 in). At the rear there was a narrow fin mounting a deep, fabric-covered balanced rudder with a trapezoidal profile. A roughly triangular tailplane was mounted on the top of the fuselage and forward of the rudder post. It was fabric-covered apart from a ply leading edge and carried constant chord elevators separated by a small nick for rudder movement.

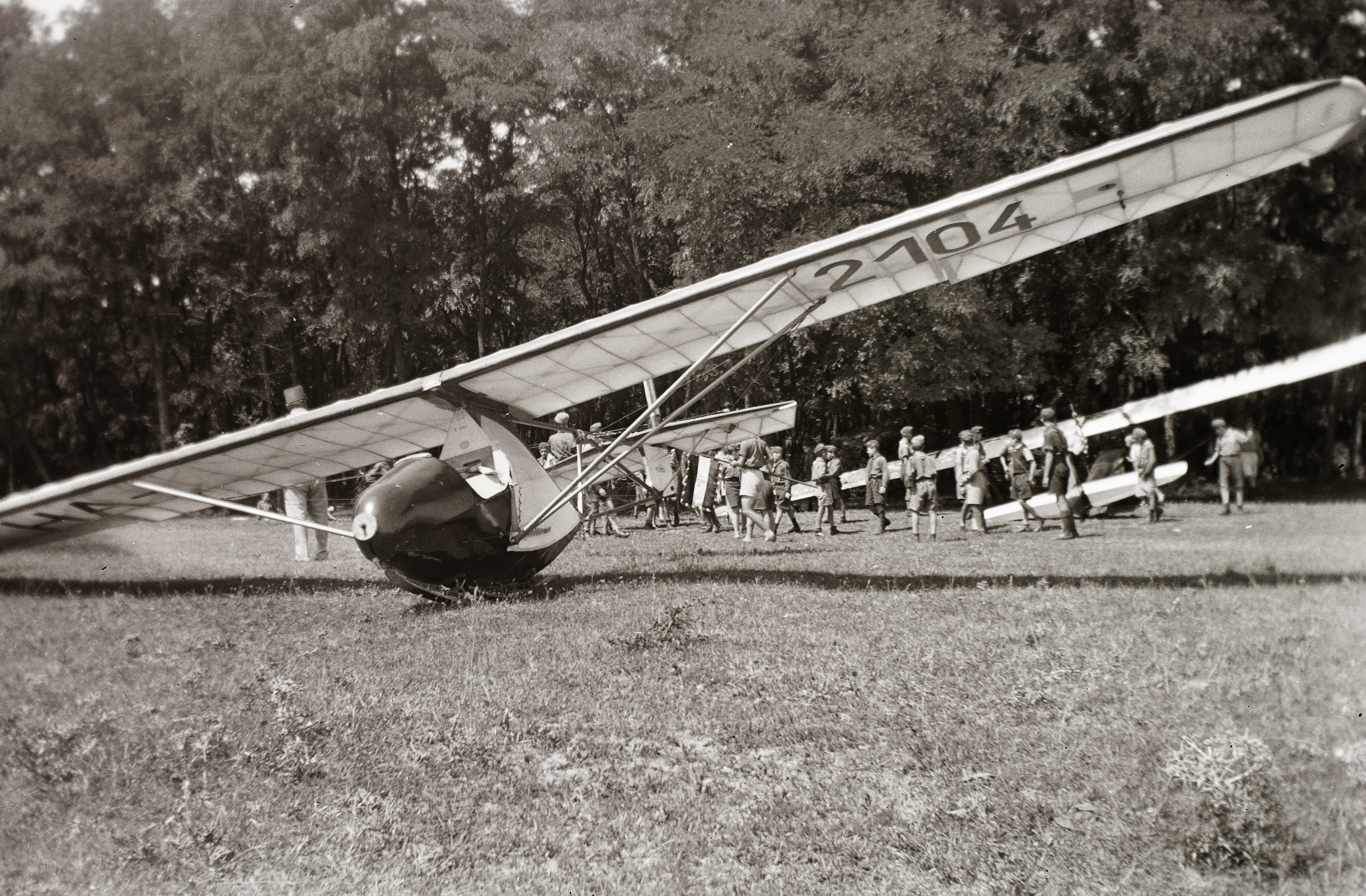
R-07b Vöcsök

== Operational history ==
Despite the large number built (c.530 including all variants), remaining in use from 1938 to the early 60s, little is recorded in English about individual examples or their distribution over Hungarian aeroclubs. A 1981 replica R-07b, HA-2336, remained active until at least 2008.

== Aircraft on display ==
- R-07b Vöcsök HA-2254, Kzlekedesi Muzeum, Budapest.

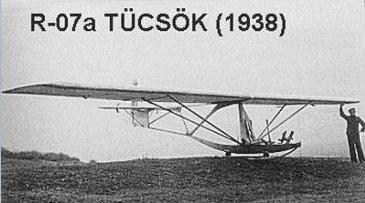

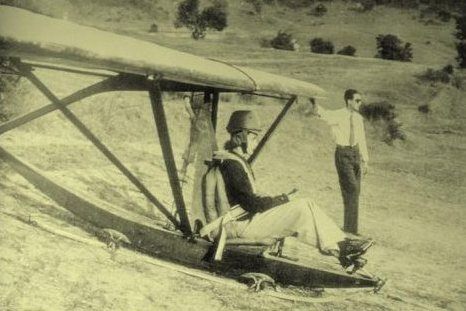
R-07a Tücsök

== Variants ==
R-05 Vöcsök
First prototype, with nacelle. First flown 1 October 1937.
R-06 Csóvöcsök
Steel tube fuselage. First flown in 1939.
R-07a Tücsök
Production model with no seat enclosure. Fin area reduced by cropping to lower longeron; rudder similarly cropped with compensation extension of upper tip. First flown 20 March 1938. 178 built by Aero Ever Kft, Esztergom
R-07b Vöcsök
Production model with nacelle, greater span and length, increasing performance. First flight 1938. About 300 built, mostly by Aero Ever Kft but also including 12 by the Transylvanian Aircraft Plant, Nagyvárad Oradea.
R-07D Vöcsök
1955-6 production batch of 30 examples built by the Experimental Aircraft Plant of the Hungarian Aeronautical Association (MRSz), Dunakesziwith. Fitted with Frise ailerons. In use into early 1960s.

== Specifications (R-07 Vöcsök) ==
General characteristics

- Crew: One
- Length: 6.3 m (20 ft 8 in)
- Wingspan: 11.6 m (38 ft 1 in)
- Wing area: 15.0 m^{2} (161 sq ft)
- Aspect ratio: 8.97
- Airfoil: Göttingen Gö 533
- Empty weight: 110 kg (243 lb)
- Gross weight: 195 kg (430 lb)

Performance

- Maximum speed: 110 km/h (68 mph, 59 kn)
- Stall speed: 43 km/h (27 mph, 23 kn)
- Maximum glide ratio: 15
- Rate of sink: 0.95 m/s (187 ft/min) minimum at 52 km/h (32 mph; 28 kn)
