= List of gliders (R) =

This is a list of gliders/sailplanes of the world, (this reference lists all gliders with references, where available) Note: Any aircraft can glide for a short time, but gliders are designed to glide for longer.

== R ==
=== Raciti ===
(A. Raciti)

- Raciti Grifone

=== Raab ===
(Fritz Raab)

- Raab R2
- Raab Doppelraab
- Raab Krähe
- Pützer Motorraab – built by Alfons Pützer

=== Raab-Katzenstein ===
(Raab-Katzenstein Flugzeugwerk GmbH (RaKa) - Antonius RAAB & Kurt KATZENSTEIN)

- Raab-Katzenstein RK-7 Schmetterling

=== Rackaři ===
- Rackaři ŠBK-1 Racek-1

=== Radab ===
(Sven Olof Ridder & Harald Unden – Radab)

- Radab Windex 1100
- Radab Windex 1200C

=== Raddings-Locke ===
(J. E. Raddings & W. E. Locke / Hull Gliding Club, Hedon, Yorkshire, United Kingdom)

- Radlock Trainer

=== J. A. I. Reid ===
(J. A. I. Reid)

- Reid Small Glider

=== Reinhard ===
(Gerhard Reinhard)

- Reinhard Cumulus
- Reinhard Cirrus

=== Renard ===
(Charles Renard)

- Renard Décaplan Aéride

=== Rensselaer ===
(Rensselaer Polytechnic Institute)

- Rensselaer RP-1
- Rensselaer RP-2
- Rensselaer RP-3

=== REP ===
(Robert Esnault-Pelterie)

- REP Type-1
- REP Type-2

=== Reussner ===
- Reussner J.C.R. 1
- Reussner Swift
- Reussner-Brown Biplace – Reussner, J. C. & Brown, T. A.

=== RFB ===
(Rhein-Flugzeugbau GmbH)

- Rhein Flugzeugbau RW-3
- RFB Sirius II

=== Ree-Miller ===
(Terry Miller & John Ree & Bill Ree)

- Ree-Miller Cherokee RM

=== Revallo ===
(Ján Revallo)

- Revallo R-1 Urpín

=== Reynard ===
(Reynard Glider Construction Co, Aylestone, Leicester, United Kingdom)

- Reynard R.4 Primary (a.k.a. Reynolds R.4 Primary?)

=== RFD ===
(Reginald Foster Dagnall / R.F.D. Co )

- RFD Primary Type AT (Dagling)
- RFD 2 Sailplane

=== Richardson ===
(Geoff Richardson)

- Richardson Golden Eagle

=== Richter ===
(Hans Richter)

- Richter Möwe

=== Ridgefield ===
(Ridgefield Manufacturing Company of Ridgeville, NJ)

- Ridgefield PG-2 – powered CG-4

=== Ridley ===
(Cyril Ridley)

- Ridley 1910 glider

=== Riedel ===
(Peter Riedel)

- Riedel PR-1 – Peter Riedel
- Riedel PR-2 – Peter Riedel

=== Rimsa-Miliunas ===
(Z. Rimsa, G. Miliunas)

- Rimsa-Miliunas Keva motorglider
- Rimsa Keva

=== Rio Claro ===
(Aero Clube de Rio Claro)

- Rio Claro Araponga

=== RLM ===
(Reichsluftfahrtministerium – Reich Ministry of Aviation) (Glider designations)

- 108-10 Schneider Grunau 9 primary glider (1929)
- 108-11 RRG Zögling 33 primary glider (1933)
- 108-14 DFS Schulgleiter SG.38 standard basic gliding trainer (1938)
- 108-15 RRG Zögling 12m primary glider (1934)
- 108-16 Weber EW-2 four-seat high-performance sailplane
- 108-21 Hirth Hi 21 two-seat sailplane
- 108-22 Hirth Hi 20 MoSe (for Motorsegler = motor glider); motorized glider
- 108-29 Fliege IIa primary glider (1935)
- 108-30 DFS Kranich II two-seat sailplane (1935)
- 108-47 Jacobs Rhönadler single-seat high-performance sailplane (1932)
- 108-48 Dittmar Condor I high-performance sailplane (1932)
- 108-49 Schneider Grunau Baby II glider (1932)
- 108-50 Jacobs Rhönbussard single-seat high-performance sailplane (1933)
- 108-51 Jacobs Rhönsperber single-seat high-performance sailplane (1935)
- 108-53 DFS Habicht single-seat acrobatics sailplane (1936)
- 108-56 Dittmar Condor II single-seat high-performance sailplane (1935)
- 108-58 Hirth Göppingen Gö 1 Wolf sailplane (1935)
- 108-59 Hirth Göppingen Gö 3 Minimoa high-performance sailplane (1935)
- 108-60 Jacobs Reiher single-seat high-performance sailplane (1937)
- 108-61 Hütter / Schempp-Hirth Göppingen Gö 4 two-seat sailplane (1937)
- 108-62 Schwarzwald-Flugzeugbau Donaueschingen Strolch high-performance sailplane
- 108-63 Akaflieg München Mü13D Merlin high-performance sailplane (1936)
- 108-64 Schwarzwald-Flugzeugbau Donaueschingen Ibis
- 108-65 Dittmar / Schleicher Condor III single-seat high-performance sailplane (1938)
- 108-66 Schneider Grunau Baby III sailplane (1938)
- 108-67 Hütter Hü 17 sailplane (1937)
- 108-68 Jacobs Weihe high-performance single-seat sailplane (1938)
- 108-70 Jacobs Olympia Meise high-performance single-seat sailplane (1939)
- 108-72 Akaflieg München Mü17 Merle high-performance sailplane (1939)
- 108-74 FVA Aachen / Schmetz FVA 10b Rheinland high-performance sailplane

=== Roberts ===
(Donald Roberts)

- Roberts Cygnet

=== Roberts ===
(Frank Roberts)

- Roberts Primary

=== Robertson ===
( A. Robertson)

- Robertson Bamboo

=== Robinson ===
(John Robinson)

- Robinson Robin

=== Rochelt ===
(Günther Rochelt)

- Rochelt Flair 30
- Rochelt Minair
- Rochelt Musculair I
- Rochelt Musculair II
- Rochelt Solair I
- Rochelt Solair II

=== Rolladen-Schneider ===
(Rolladen-Schneider Flugzeugbau GmbH / LS – Lemke-Schneider)

- Rolladen-Schneider LS1
- Rolladen-Schneider LS2
- Rolladen-Schneider LS3
- Rolladen-Schneider LS4
- Rolladen-Schneider LS5
- Rolladen-Schneider LS6
- Rolladen-Schneider LS7
- Rolladen-Schneider LS8
- Rolladen-Schneider LS9
- Rolladen-Schneider LS10
- Akaflieg Köln LS11
- Rolladen-Schneider LSD Ornith

=== Rolle ===
( J. Rollé)

- Rollé 1922 glider

=== Romeo ===
(Industrie Meccaniche e Aeronautiche Meridionali / Officine Meccaniche Romeo)

- Romeo Ro-35 (IMAM Ro-35)

=== Rosario ===
(Juvenelle Rosario – Florianópolis, Brazil)

- Rosario Skua

=== Ross ===
- Ross R-2 Ibis
- Ross R-3
- Ross RH-3
- Ross-Johnson RJ-5
- Ross R-6
- Ross-Stephens RS-1 Zanonia – Harland Ross & Harvey Stephens – Ross Stephens Aircraft Company of Montebello, California
- Ross-Stephens RS-3 Ibis – Harland Ross & Harvey Stephens – Ross-Stephens Aircraft Company of Montebello, California

=== Vernie Ross ===
(Vernie Ross)

- Ross Ranger I
- Ross Ranger II

=== Rostock ===
(Paul Krekel / Mecklenburgische Aero-Klub, Rostock')

- Rostock Primary
- Rostock M-I Baumeister
- Rostock M-II Mecklenburg
- Rostock M-III Rostock

=== Rostov ===
(Rostov Technical Institute)

- Rostov GT-1 Kaganovich

=== Rotondi ===
(Gianfranco Rotondi)

- Rotondi R-1 Gheppio
- Rotondi R-2 Tobia

=== Rotter ===
(Lajos Rotter)

- Rotter Karakan – Lajos Rotter – Boy Scout Group "Ezermester" – MOVERO
- Rotter Nemere – Lajos Rotter – Hungarian Aircraft Repair Works, Székesfehérvár
- Janka-Rotter Vándor with Zoltán Janka
- Rotter-Ágotay 1922 glider with István Ágotay

=== Rousset ===
(Mauritius Rousset)

- Rousset glider

=== RRG ===
(Rhön-Rossitten Gesellschaft)

- RRG Urubu Obs
- RRG Delta I
- RRG Ente – Alexander Lippisch & Fritz Stam
- RRG Hangwind – Alexander Lippisch
- RRG Hols der Teufel – Alexander Lippisch
- RRG Professor
- RRG Prüfling
- RRG Falke
- RRG Schuldoppelsitzer
- RRG Storch I
- RRG Storch V
- RRG Wien
- RRG Zögling
- RRG Fafnir
- RRG Fafnir 2 (São Paulo)

=== Rubik ===
(Ernő Rubik – father of the Rubiks Cube inventor)

- MSrE M-20 alternatively Rubik R-01 (retrospectively) or EMESE-B.
- Rubik R-03 Szittya I
- Rubik R-04 Szittya II
- Rubik R-05 Vöcsök
- Rubik R-06 Vöcsök
- Rubik R-07
- Rubik R-08 Pilis
- Rubik Győr 3 Motor-Pilis, possibly R-09.
- Rubik R-10 Szittya III
- Rubik R-11b Cimbora
- Rubik R-12 Kevély (Proud)
- Rubik R-15 Koma (Pard/Panthera)
- Rubik R-16 Lepke (Butterfly)
- Rubik R-17 Móka (Fun)
- Rubik R-20 (OE-01)
- Rubik R-21
- Rubik R-22 Futár (Courier)
- Rubik R-23 Gébics (Shrike)
- Rubik R-24 Bibic (Lapwing)
- Rubik R-25 Mokány (Little Devil)
- Rubik R-25-4
- Rubik R-26 Góbé (Chieftain)
- Rubik R-27 Kópé (Scamp)
- Rubik R-29
- Rubik R-30
- Rubik R-31 Dupla (Double)
- Gyõr-3 Motor-Pilis (Gyõr Soaring Club, Gyõr)

=== Rudlicki ===
(Jerzy Rudlicki)

- Rudlicki nr.1
- Rudlicki nr.2
- Rudlicki nr.3
- Rudlicki nr.7
- Rudlicki nr.8
- Rudlicki nr.9

=== Ruhm ===
(UL RuhmAir Leichtflugzeuge / Mannfred Ruhm)

- Ruhmer Swift Light
- Ruhmer E-Swift
- Ruhmer Swift Light PAS

=== Ruppert ===
(Ruppert Composite GmbH)

- Ruppert Archaeopteryx

=== Rutan ===
(Rutan Aircraft Factory)

- Rutan Solitaire

=== Ryley ===
(Leslie G. Ryley / Coventry Aero Club)

- Ryley Dragon-Fly 1914

=== Ryson ===
(T. Claude Ryan and Son)

- Ryson ST-100 Cloudster
- Ryson STP-1 Swallow
