= RP2 =

RP2, RP-2, RP.2, RP 2, or variant, may refer to:

- DZSR, a Philippine radio station known as Radyo Pilipinas 2 or RP2 Sports
- Rensselaer RP-2, crewed glider
- Radioplane RP-2, drone aircraft
- Rocket Propellant 2 (RP-2), see RP-1
- 2-inch RP, a cold-war era Royal Navy rocket
- Retinitis pigmentosa-2 (RP2), see Retinitis pigmentosa
- Asteroid RP2
  - 5199 Dortmund or 1981 RP2, asteroid Dortmund, RP2 from 1981, the 5199th asteroid catalogued
  - (5575) 1985 RP2, RP2 from 1985, the 5575th asteroid catalogued
  - 12234 Shkuratov or 1986 RP2, asteroid Shkuratov, RP2 from 1986, the 12234th asteroid catalogued
  - (85176) 1990 RP2, RP2 from 1990, the 85176th asteroid catalogued
  - 96217 Gronchi or 1993 RP2, asteroid Gronchi, RP2 from 1993, the 96217th asteroid catalogued
- Real projective plane (RP^{2})
- RP2 (gene), a gene that encodes protein XRP2
- RP2, a competitor classification in paraclimbing
