= MU-1 =

Mu-1 may refer to:

- Midwest MU-1, a glider
- Mu-1 rocket, a Japanese rocket
