= R31 =

R31 or R-31 may refer to:

== Automobiles ==
- Nissan Pintara (R31), a compact car sold in Australia
- Nissan Skyline (R31), a mid-size car
- Renault R31, a Formula One racing car

== Aviation ==
- R31 (airship), of the Royal Navy
- Renard R.31, a Belgian reconnaissance aircraft
- Rubik R-31 Dupla, a Hungarian training glider

== Other uses ==
- R-31 (missile), a Soviet submarine-launched ballistic missile
- R31 (South Africa), a road
- Chlorofluoromethane, a refrigerant
- Herero language
- HMS Warrior (R31), an aircraft carrier of the Royal Navy
- R31: Contact with acids liberates toxic gas, a risk phrase
