= Cumulus (disambiguation) =

Cumulus is a type of cloud with the appearance of a lump of cotton wool.

Cumulus may also refer to:

== Computing ==
- Cumulus (software), digital asset management software developed by Canto Software
- Cumulus Corporation, a defunct computer hardware company
- Cumulus Networks, a computer software company

== Gliders ==
- Reinhard Cumulus, a West German glider
- US Aviation Cumulus, an American motorglider

== Other uses ==
- Cumulus Media, a radio broadcasting company
- Cumulus (sculpture), a monumental sculpture by Karen LaMonte

== See also ==
- Cumulus oophorus, cells which surround a human egg after fertilisation
