= Omre =

Omre may refer to:

- Arthur Omre (1887–1967), Norwegian novelist and writer of short stories
- The OMRE OE-01, a 1951 Hungarian experimental high performance sailplane
- The Organic Moderated Reactor Experiment (OMRE), a 1957 nuclear reactor in Idaho
