= RP3 =

RP3, RP-3, RP.3, RP 3, or variant, may refer to:

- DZRM, a Philippine radio station known as Radyo Pilipinas 3 or RP3 Alert
- RP-3, the British 3-inch rocket projectile munition
- Rega Planar 3 (RP3), a record player manufactured by Rega Research
- Retinitis pigmentosa-3 (RP3 or RPGR), see Retinitis pigmentosa
- Asteroid RP3
  - (12683) 1983 RP3, RP3 from 1983, the 12683-th asteroid catalogued
  - (17401) 1985 RP3, RP3 from 1985, the 17401-th asteroid catalogued
  - 4944 Kozlovskij or 1987 RP3, asteroid Kozlovskij, RP3 from 1987, the 4944-th asteroid catalogued
  - 52271 Lecorbusier or 1988 RP3, asteroid Lecorbusier, RP3 from 1988, the 52271-th asteroid catalogued
  - 24712 Boltzmann or 1991 RP3, asteroid Boltzmann, RP3 from 1991, the 24712-th asteroid catalogued
  - (7969) 1997 RP3, RP3 from 1997, the 7969-th asteroid catalogued
- Rocket Propellant 3 (RP-3), see RP-1
- Rensselaer RP-3, crewed glider
- Radioplane RP-3, UAV
- Lockheed RP-3 Orion, a variant of the P-3, see List of Lockheed P-3 Orion variants
- Real projective space RP^{3} or $\mathbb{P}_3(\mathbb{R})$
- RP3, a competitor classification in paraclimbing
