= MSrE M-19 =

M-19
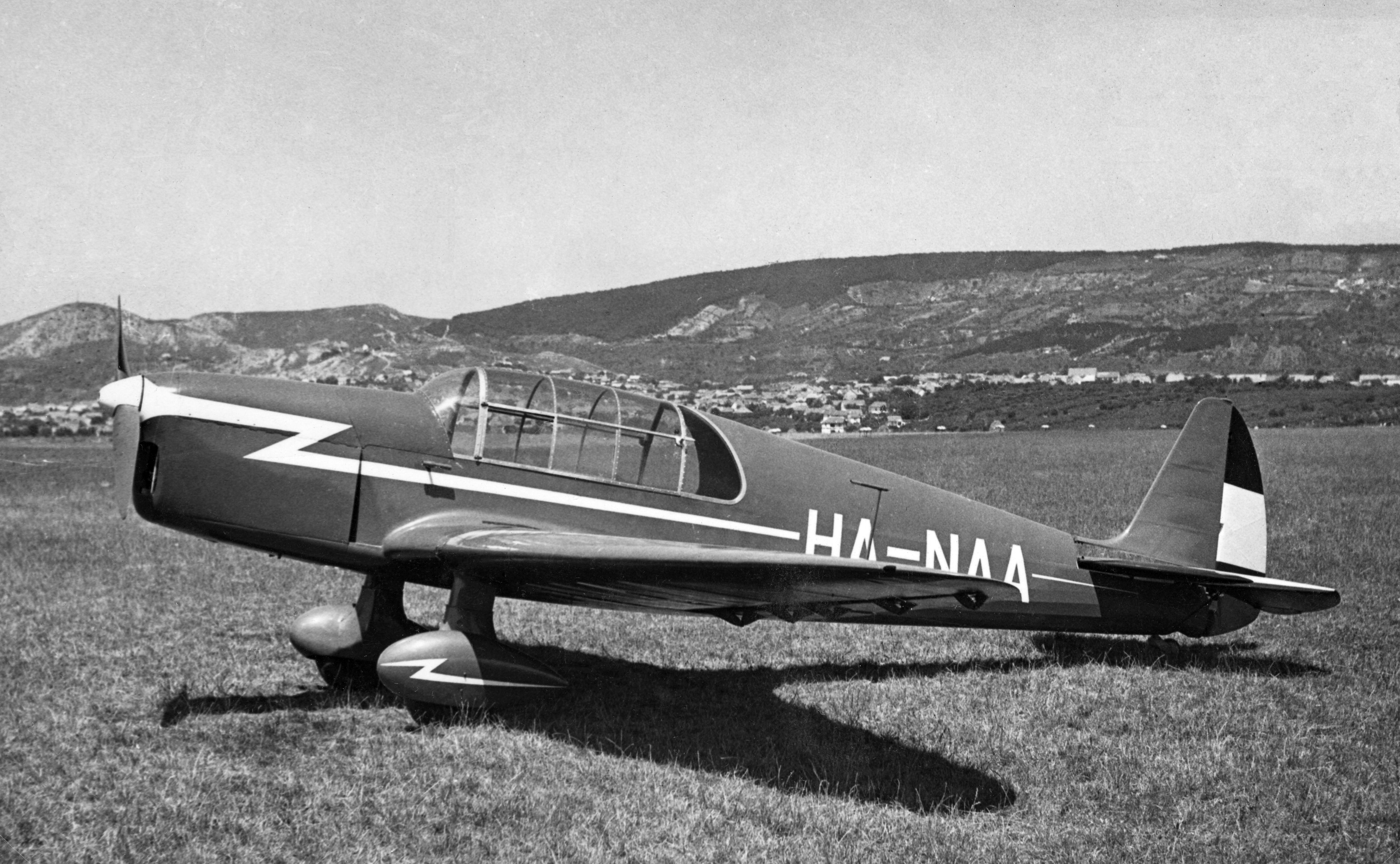

General information
- Type: Sport aircraft
- National origin: Hungary
- Manufacturer: Műegyetemi Sportrepülő Egyesület
- Designer: Ernő Rubik
- Number built: 1

History
- First flight: 1937

The MSrE M-19, also known as the Rubik R-02 after its designer Ernő Rubik, was a sport aircraft built in Hungary in 1937. Sándor Geönczy initially worked with Rubik on the project, but died before it was completed. The M-19 was a conventional, low-wing cantilever monoplane with a wing of elliptical planform and fixed, tailskid undercarriage. The pilot and passenger sat in tandem under a streamlined canopy that fully enclosed the cockpit, and the main wheels were covered with spats. When the design was finalised, Rubik's calculations were verified by the Aviation Institute in Warsaw and a single prototype constructed.

The M-19 was displayed at Budapest's annual International Fair in May 1937, but was involved in a tragedy shortly thereafter. On 1 July, on its second test flight, the aircraft rolled over, killing veteran pilot István Dobos. Rebuilt after the crash, the M-19 was flown for a few more years and participated in a number of international competitions. However, no series production was ever undertaken and the prototype was finally burned at the end of 1942.

== Specifications ==
Data from Cziráky 1990, 2–4

General characteristics

- Crew: One pilot
- Capacity: 1 passenger
- Length: 8.00 m (26 ft 3 in)
- Wingspan: 10.20 m (33 ft 6 in)
- Height: 2.70 m (8 ft 10 in)
- Wing area: 14.0 m^{2} (151 sq ft)
- Empty weight: 550 kg (1,200 lb)
- Gross weight: 850 kg (1,900 lb)
- Powerplant: 1 × de Havilland Gipsy Major , 100 kW (130 hp)

Performance

- Maximum speed: 250 km/h (140 mph, 120 kn)
- Range: 1,000 km (600 mi, 520 nmi)
- Service ceiling: 5,200 m (17,000 ft)
- Rate of climb: 3.7 m/s (730 ft/min)
