= Schultz ABC =

ABC
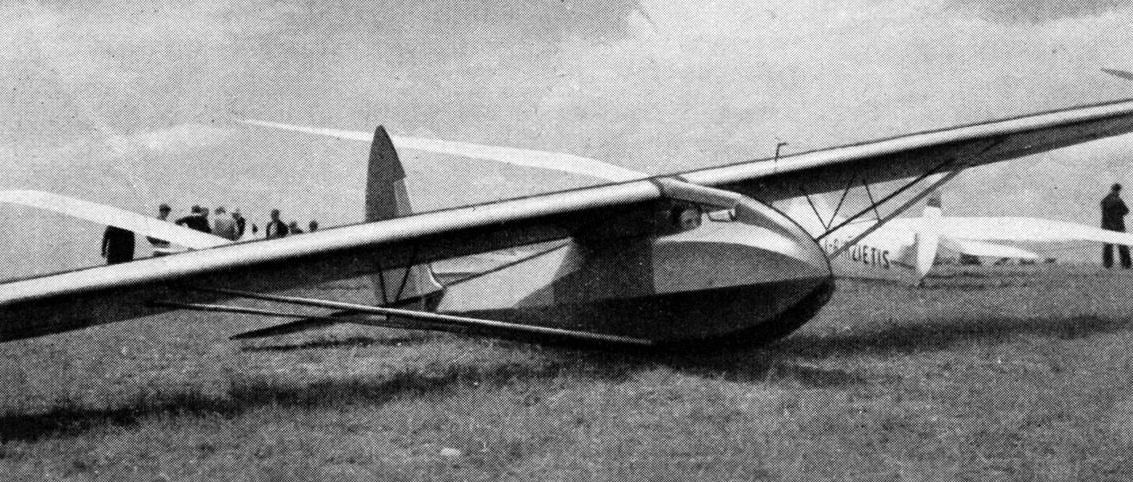

General information
- Type: Glider
- National origin: United States
- Manufacturer: Schultz
- Designer: Arthur B. Schultz
- Number built: 4

History
- First flight: 1937

The Schultz ABC was a 1930s American glider designed by Arthur B. Schultz.

== Design and development ==
The ABC was designed to compete in the 1937 Eaton Design Contest held in conjunction with the 8th US National Gliding Championships. This competition was open to any new American glider design that had not been flown at a previous National Championship. The rules required drawings and stress analysis data to be presented with the completed aircraft. The intention was that the winning design would be made available as drawings and kits for amateur construction and that Bureau of Air Commerce design approval would be eventually obtained as well.

The winners of the contest and the cash prizes won were:

- First - US$700 - ABC Sailplane, Arthur B. Schultz, designer
- Second - US$500 - Ross RS-1 Zanonia Sailplane, Harland Ross, designer
- Third - US$300 - SGU 1-6 Utility Glider, Ernst and Paul Schweizer, designers

The ABC was a development of the earlier short-span Midwest MU-1, it had a two-spar two-strut wooden wing and a fabric covered steel tube fuselage and tail.

The ABC was to be available for homebuilding but only four were built before the Second World War. In 1942 one glider was used with the designation TG-16 at the USAAC glider training school in Mobile, Alabama.

== Operators ==
United States

- United States Army Air Corps

== Specifications ==
Data from Sailplane Directory

General characteristics

- Crew: 1
- Wingspan: 48 ft 6 in (14.78 m)
- Wing area: 175 sq ft (16.36 m^{2})
- Empty weight: 300 lb (136 kg)
- Gross weight: 470 lb (213 kg)

Performance

- Rate of sink: 167 ft/min (0.85 m/s)

== See also ==
Related lists

- List of gliders
