= Ernő Rubik (aircraft designer) =

Hungarian aircraft designer (1910–1997)

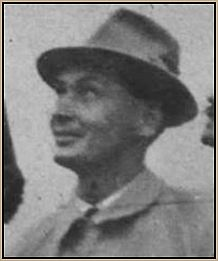
- Rubik in 1941
- Born: 27 November 1910; Pöstyén, Austria-Hungary (now Piešťany, Slovakia)
- Died: 13 February 1997 (aged 86)
- Other names: Ernő Rubik Sr.
- Occupation: Aircraft designer
- Known for: Designing 28 gliders and 5 powered aircraft
- Children: Ernő Rubik

Ernő Rubik (27 November 1910 in Pöstyén, Austria-Hungary, now Piešťany, Slovakia – 13 February 1997) was a Hungarian aircraft designer and father of Ernő Rubik, the architect who became famous for his mechanical puzzles (e.g. the Rubik's Cube).

== Early life ==
Rubik was born in Austria-Hungary (modern day Slovakia). His father was reported to be missing in action in 1915 at the Eastern front. The war orphan enrolled in the Technical University of Budapest in 1929, studying mechanical engineering.

== Career ==
During the 1930s, he designed several gliders for manufacture by Műegyetemi Sportrepülő Egyesület, the sport flying association of the Budapest Technical University. In the years following the Second World War, these designs were followed by a number of powered aircraft, making Rubik the country's most prolific aircraft designer. These were manufactured by his own enterprise, Aero-Ever in Esztergom, until the firm was nationalised in 1948 as Sportárutermelő Vállalat.

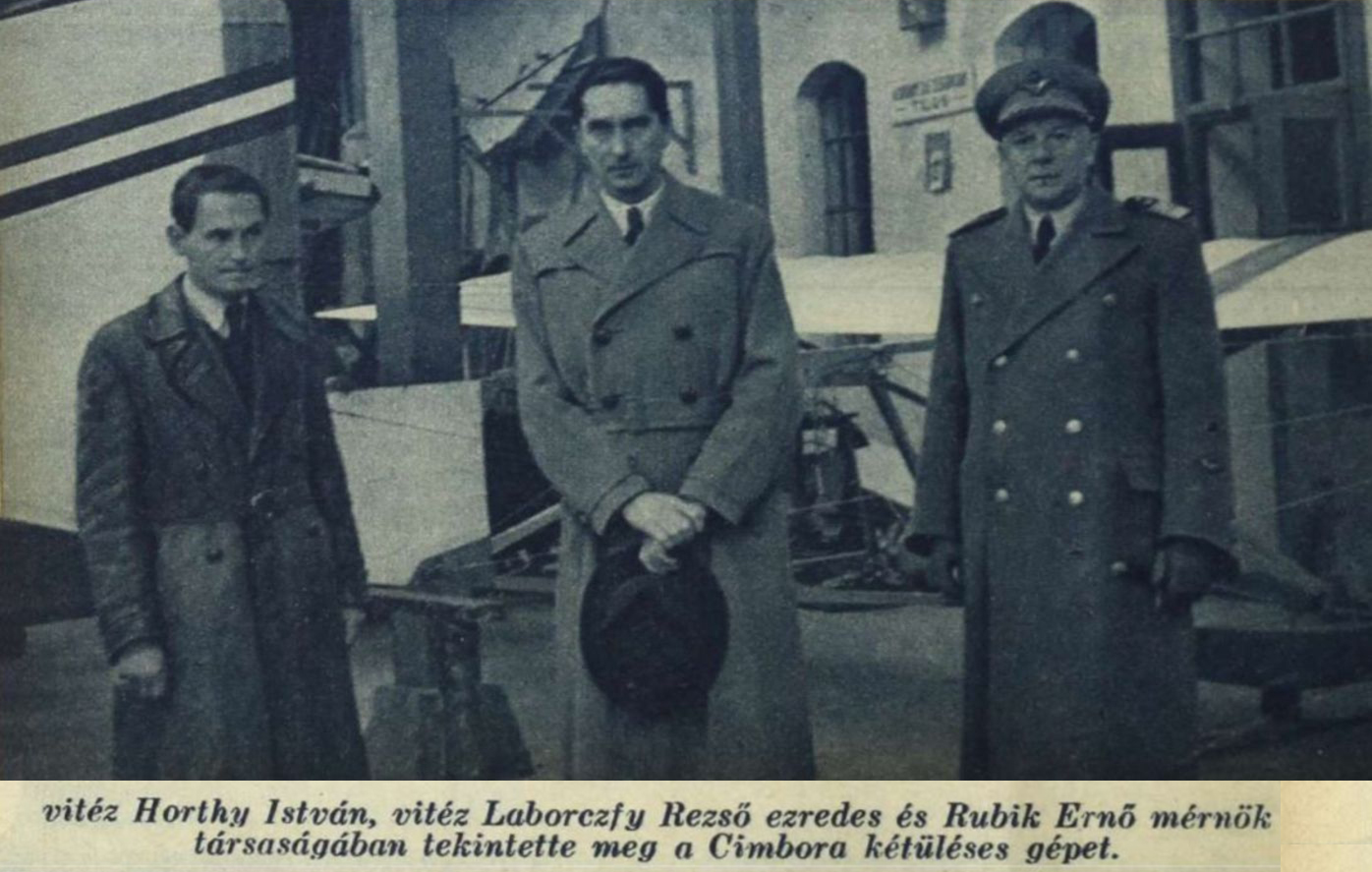
Rubik (far left) in 1941

Rubik designed 28 gliders and 5 powered aircraft during his career.

One of his most famous aircraft is the R-26 Góbé, a popular training glider in Hungary.

== Personal life ==
Rubik retired in 1971, and died on 13 February 1997. His son, also called Ernő Rubik, is an architect who most famously invented the Rubik's Cube.

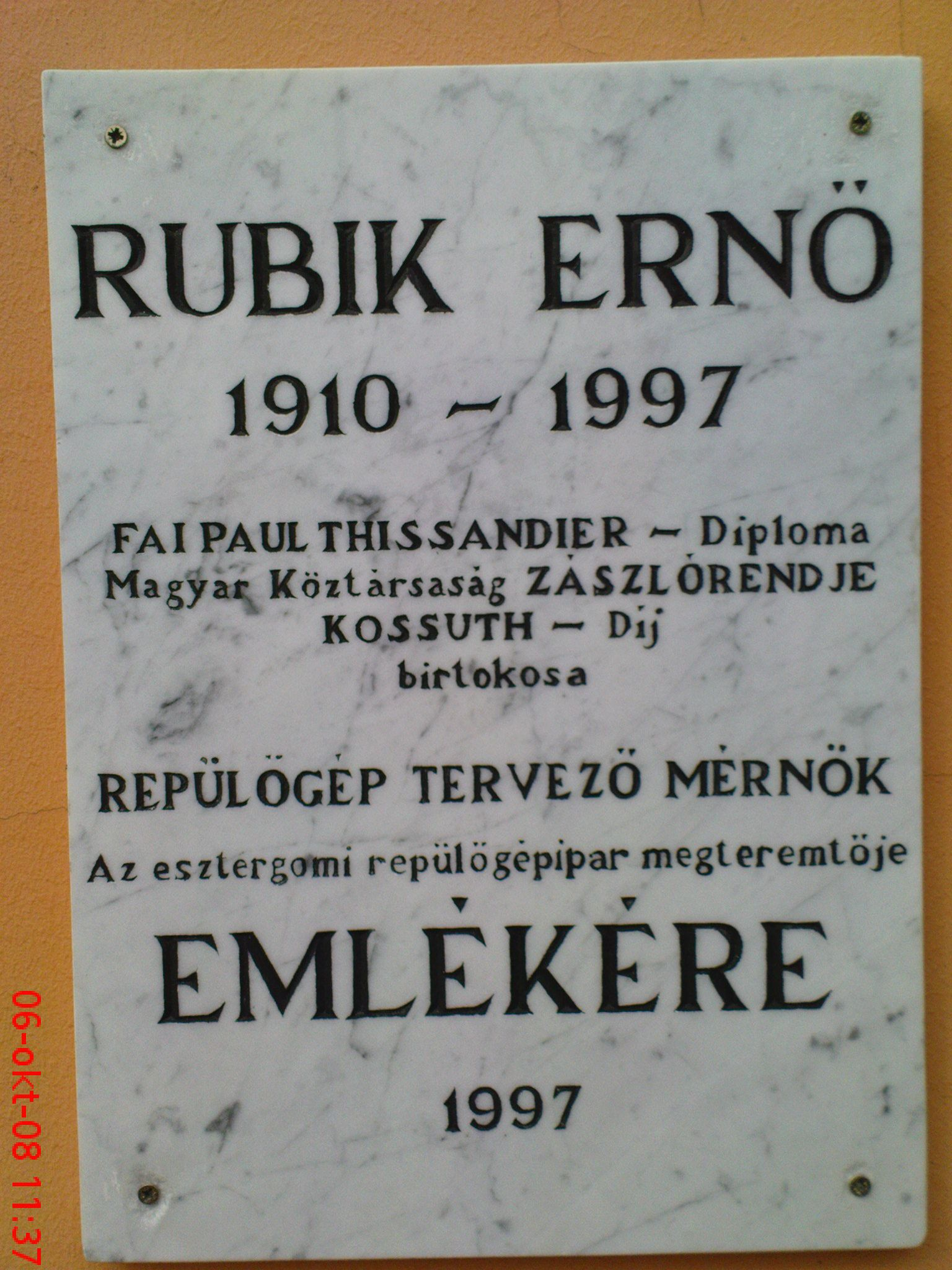
Rubik's memorial plaque

== Notable aircraft designed ==
- MSrE M-20 (1936)
- MSrE M-19 (1937)
- Rubik R-03 Szittya I (1937)
- Rubik R-07 Vöcsök (1937)
- Rubik R-08 Pilis (1939)
- Rubik R-03 Szittya I (1940)
- Rubik R-11b Cimbora (1941)
- Rubik R-17 Móka (1944)
- Rubik R-18 Kánya (1948)
- Rubik R-12 Kevély (1949)
- Rubik R-15 Koma (1949)
- Rubik R-16 Lepke (1949)
- Rubik R-22 Futár (1950)
- OMRE OE-01 (1951)
- Rubik R-23 Gébics (1957)
- Rubik R-25 Mokány (1960)
- Rubik R-26 Góbé (1961)
- Rubik R-27 Kópé (1961/1962)
- Rubik R-31 Dupla (1983)
