= Ross R-2 Ibis =

American glider

R-2 Ibis

General information
- Type: Glider
- National origin: United States
- Manufacturer: Harland Ross
- Designer: Harland Ross
- Status: One built, written off 1940
- Number built: One

History
- First flight: circa 1938
- Developed from: Ross RS-1 Zanonia
- Variant: Ross RH-3

The Ross R-2 Ibis was a single seat, mid-wing, gull winged glider that was designed by Harland Ross in about 1938, under a commission from the Soaring Society of America. The sole example was destroyed in 1940.

== Design and development ==
With the success of the Ross RS-1 Zanonia placing third at the 1937 US Nationals and also winning second place in the Eaton Design Contest, the Soaring Society of America commissioned Ross to design and build a new sailplane for the SSA's promotional use. The resulting R-2 was named for the Ibis bird and was very similar to the RS-1, using a similar gull wing of 48 ft (14.6 m) span and an all-flying tail.

Even though the sole example was only flown for three years the R-2 lead to the Ross RH-3 design.

== Operational history ==
In use the R-2 was quite successful, making the first wave soaring flight in the United States on 25 October 1938 in the White Mountains of New Hampshire.

The glider was written off after an auto-towing accident in 1940 after the pilot attempted to reverse the tow.

== Specifications (R-2) ==
Data from Sailplane directory and Soaring

General characteristics

- Crew: 1
- Wingspan: 48 ft 0 in (14.63 m)

== See also ==
- List of gliders
