= Rubik R-18 Kánya =

Hungarian light utility and glider tug aircraft

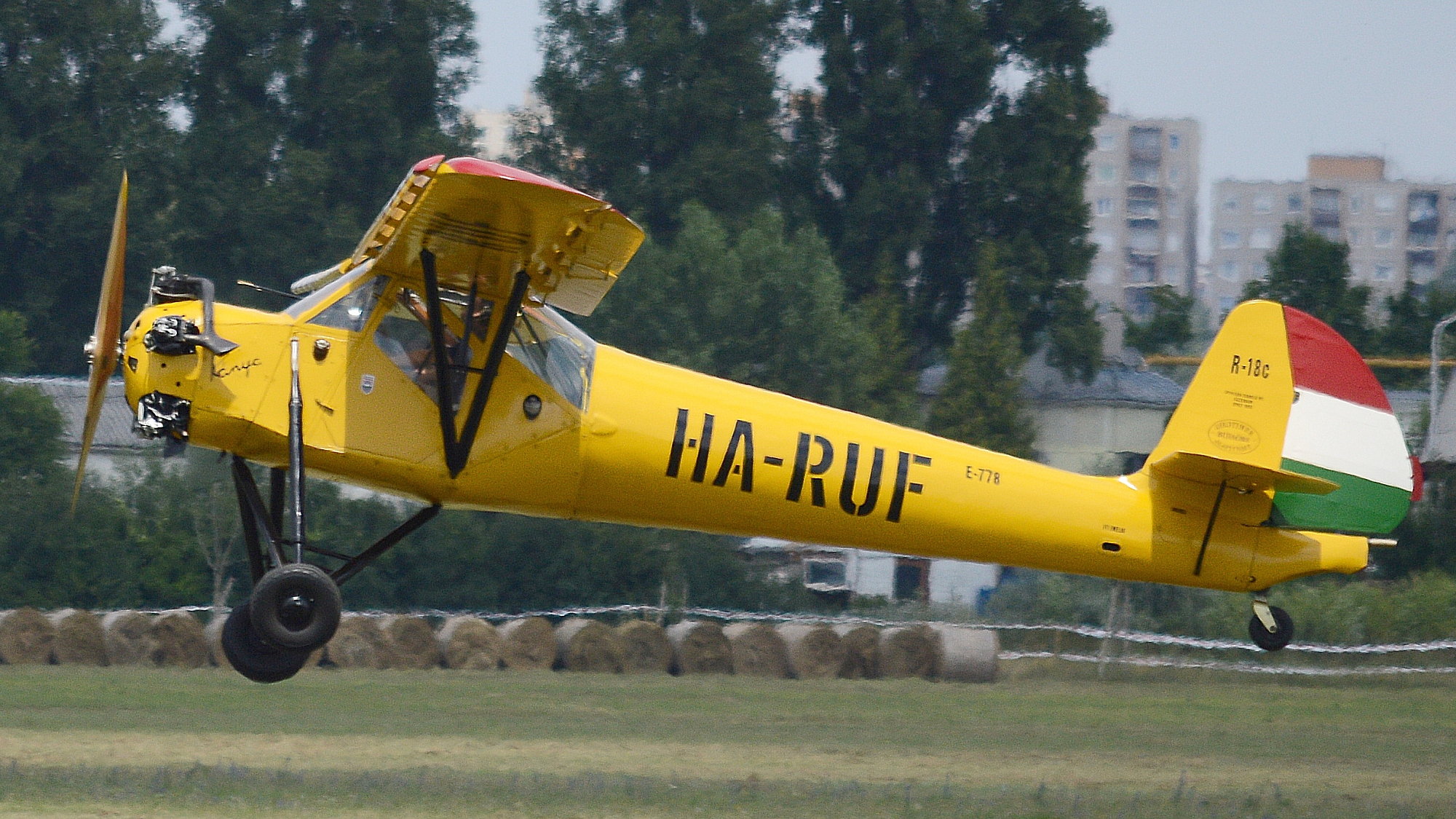

General information
- Type: 2-seat glider tug and utility aircraft
- National origin: Hungary
- Manufacturer: Aero-Ever
- Designer: Ernő Rubik
- Number built: 9

History
- First flight: 1948

The Rubik R-18 Kánya (English: Kite) is a Hungarian light utility and glider tug aircraft. It was designed by Ernő Rubik, the father of the designer of the Rubik's Cube.

== Design ==
Ernő Rubik was a co-founder and the chief designer of the Aero-Ever aircraft company of Esztergom, Hungary, which was formed in 1938. He started design of the R-18 in 1944, inspired by the Fieseler Fi 156 Storch, aiming for a smaller, lighter version, which would serve both as a glider tug and a STOL utility aircraft, to carry engineers and spares to service aircraft at other airports.

The aircraft has a high wing braced by V-struts, with fixed leading-edge slots and retractable camber-changing flaps. The fuselage is of mixed construction with two side-by-side seats, with an optional third seat behind them. It has a conventional braced tailplane and a taildragger undercarriage with divided axle long-stroke oleo legs for the main gear, and a fixed tailwheel.

== Development ==
Construction started in 1946, and the first flight of the prototype, the R-18a, c/n E-524, was on 18 May 1949. It was powered by a Walter Major 4-I four-cylinder inline engine of 96.9 kW (129.9 hp) driving a two-bladed wooden propeller. The aircraft was well received, and was used, for a time, by the Hungarian Air Force, registered 1-002, but was soon replaced and transferred to a flying club, registered HA-RUA.

The second aircraft, the R-18b, c/n E-525, registered HA-RUB, had a widened rear fuselage to make the occupant of the third seat more comfortable. It flew from 1949 to 1954 when it crashed.

The third and subsequent aircraft, designated R-18c, c/n E-761, registered HA-RUC, had a Walter Minor 6-III six-cylinder engine of 116 kW (155 hp), which extended the fuselage length to 7.7 m (25 ft). The cabin windows and doors were slightly redesigned, and the third seat was replaced by a 120 L (32 US gal; 26 imp gal) fuel tank. Because of problems with the Walter Minor in-line engines, all surviving R-18s were converted to licence-built Shvetsov M-11D five-cylinder radial engines of 93.2 kW (125.0 hp), or M-11FR engines of 119 kW (160 hp) leading to a reduced fuselage length of 7.5 m (25 ft). The conversion work was done by the Central Experimental Plant at Alag, between 1955 and 1958.

Construction of a metal version, the R-28 Metal-Kanya, was started but was not completed.

== Operational history ==
The first three aircraft were considered prototypes, and they were followed by six production aircraft, all designated R-18c and built in 1953-54. They were registered HA-RUD to HA-RUI. One aircraft was fitted with skis for winter use. They continued in use until 1966 by which time all aircraft except two had crashed and/or been scrapped or withdrawn from use.

The R-18a crashed in 1949 and was subsequently used as an instructional airframe.

== Surviving aircraft ==
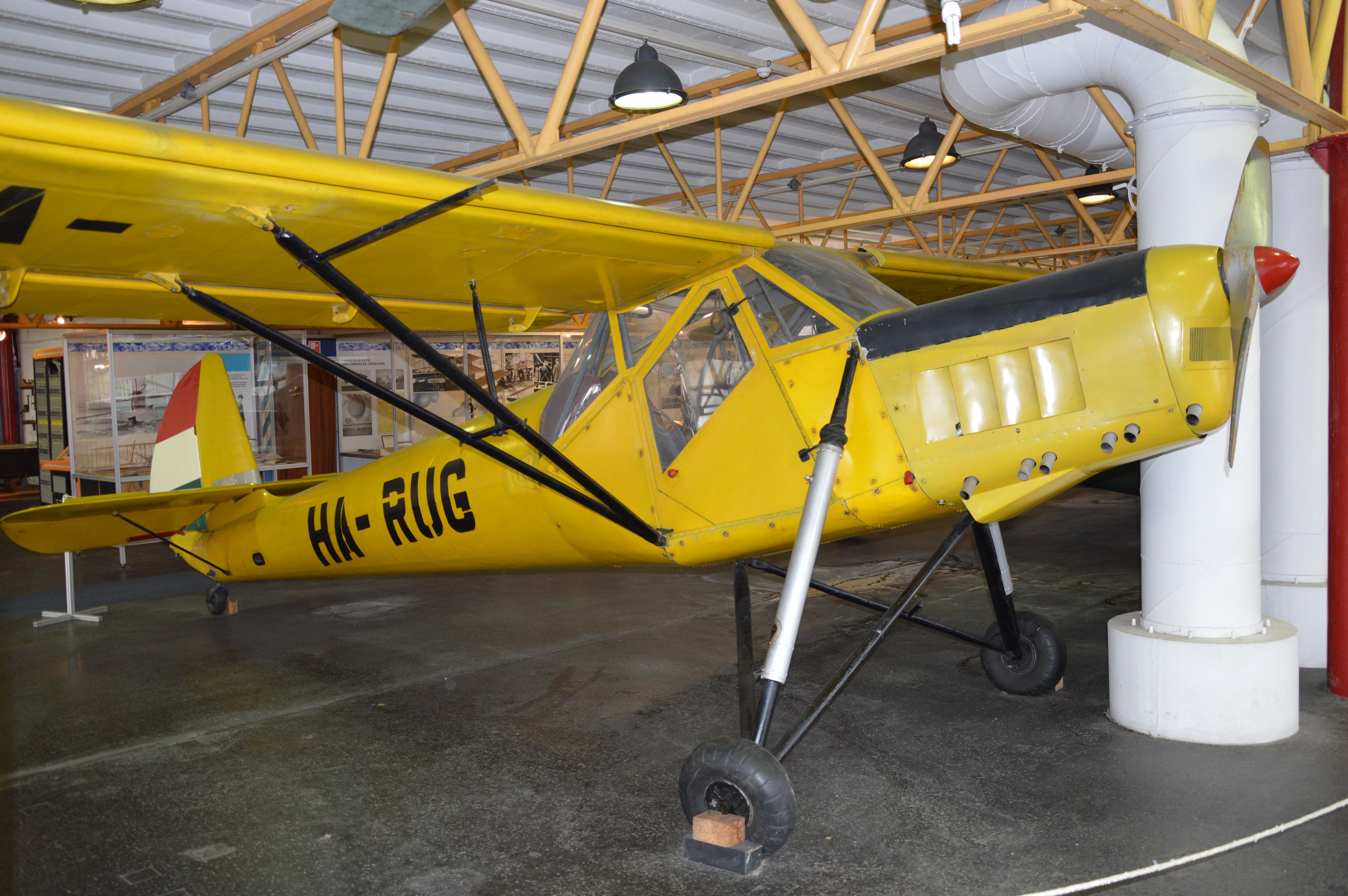
HA-RUG on display restored with an inline engine.

Two aircraft survive:

- HA-RUF, c/n E-778, was withdrawn from use in 1966 but was restored to flying condition in 2012 by the Goldtimer Foundation, and is based at Budaörs Airport, Budapest.
- HA-RUG, c/n E-779, was withdrawn from use in 1966, and was placed on display in the Hungarian Technical and Transportation Museum in Budapest, but the building was demolished in 2016 and the current status of the aircraft is unknown.

== Specifications (R-18a) ==
Data from Janes All the World's Aircraft 1953-54

General characteristics

- Crew: 2
- Length: 7.7 m (25 ft 3 in)
- Wingspan: 11.6 m (38 ft 1 in)
- Height: 2.08 m (6 ft 10 in)
- Wing area: 14 m^{2} (150 sq ft)
- Empty weight: 410 kg (904 lb)
- Gross weight: 690 kg (1,521 lb)
- Powerplant: 1 × Walter Minor 4-I 4-cylinder inverted air-cooled in-line piston engine, 119 kW (160 hp)

Performance

- Maximum speed: 175 km/h (109 mph, 94 kn)
- Range: 600 km (370 mi, 320 nmi)
- Service ceiling: 6,000 m (20,000 ft)
- Rate of climb: 5 m/s (980 ft/min)
