= Rubik R-16 Lepke =

Hungarian training glider

R-16 Lepke
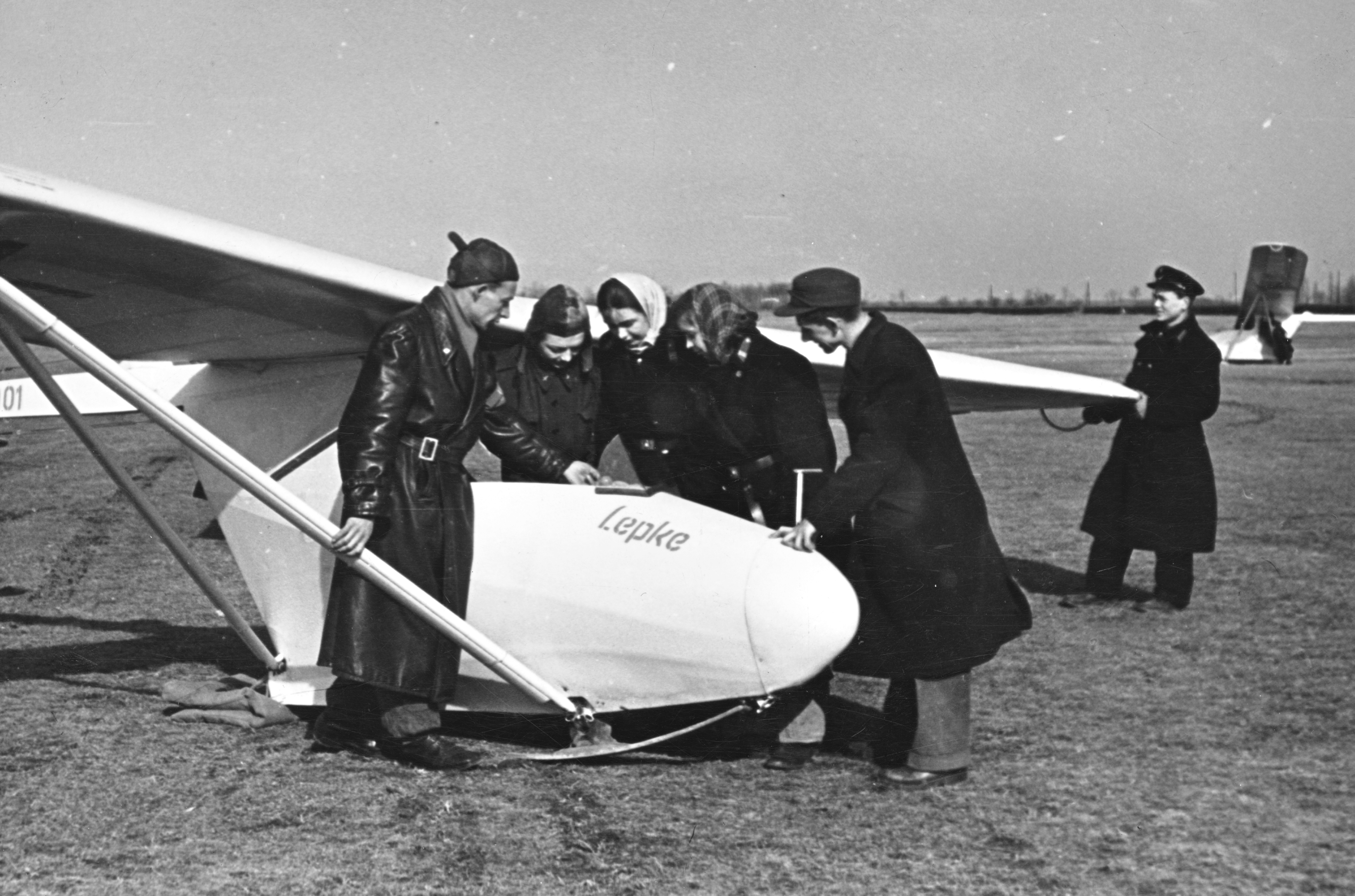

General information
- Type: Single seat basic training glider
- National origin: Hungary
- Manufacturer: Sportárutermelő Vállalat, Esztergom
- Designer: Ernő Rubik
- Number built: 66

History
- First flight: Summer 1949
- Retired: mid-1960s

The Rubik R-16 Lepke (Butterfly) was a single seat Hungarian training glider designed to follow the very similar but two seat Rubik R-15 Koma in a winch-launch training programme. The Lepke provided solo experience of the techniques learned with an instructor in an aircraft with similar handling characteristics. That done, the Lepke could be used as a standard trainer to take its pilot to C-certificate level. The pair were widely used by Hungarian glider clubs post-war, with sixty-five of each produced.

== Design and development ==
In 1940 Ernő Rubik began to consider a glider flight training programme based on a pair of aircraft with similar flight characteristics and sharing many components but differing in their seating. Students would begin on the R-15 Koma, with side-by-side seating and the reassurance and guidance of a tutor watching, then go solo on the R-16 Lepke. During the war, the Hungarian National Aviation Association (Országos Magyar Repülö Egyesület or OMRE) chose to use his R-11 Cimbora and the Koma and Lepke designs were shelved until, in 1948, OMRE announced a competition for single seat and two seat trainers. By the end of the year Rubik's two designs had been chosen. The prototype Koma first flew in the spring of 1949, followed by the Lepke in the summer.

The Lapke was a pod-and-boom glider with a high wing mounted over the front end of the boom and braced with inverted-V struts from the lower fuselage to the spar. The wing was rectangular in plan out to rounded tips and had 3° of dihedral. It was built around a single, wooden spar with wooden ribs; ply covering ahead of the spar formed a torsion-resistant D-box. The rest of the wing was fabric-covered. Diagonal drag struts near the root were made from steel tubes. Constant chord Handley Page slotted ailerons filled the outer half-spans, as on the Koma, but the high-wing Lepka did not need the Koma's flaps. Its wingspan was 4 m (13 ft 1 in) less than that of the heavier Koma. As on the Koma, the wings could be folded back alongside the fuselage once the horizontal tail had been folded upwards.

The forward pod was built around a box-section beam which projected forward to the nose, together with a frame and longerons . The beam carried the single seat in an open cockpit, locally ply-covered and with a removable ply cover fitted with a windshield, around the pilot. Elsewhere the pod was fabric-covered. From the aft of the beam a metal tube strut reached upwards and rearwards to support the boom that formed the rear fuselage. This tube, which was more steeply angled than on the 13% longer Koma, gave the pod a more abrupt rear end. The end of the fuselage beam also mounted an exposed monowheel, assisted by a short, rubber sprung landing skid ahead of it. The tailboom was a horizontal, rectangular section, wooden, ply-covered structure mounted under the centre of the wing spar and braced with wires from mid-span to the tail as well as the steel tube. The Lepke had a conventional tail with a narrow, vertically edged fin. Compared with the Koma, fin area was reduced but the roughly triangular rudder was similar. Its strut-braced horizontal tail was rectangular with rounded tips and of higher aspect ratio than the Koma. The fixed surfaces were wooden but control surfaces were light-metal structures with fabric covering.

The prototype R-16 Lepke first flew at Esztergom in the summer of 1949. A series of sixty-five slightly modified R-16bs followed over 1952-3 and these became the standard Hungarian single-seat trainer; once launching was mastered, pilots continued in the Lepke to their C certificates. The Lepkes were retired in the 1960s, after ten years of use.

== Aircraft on display ==
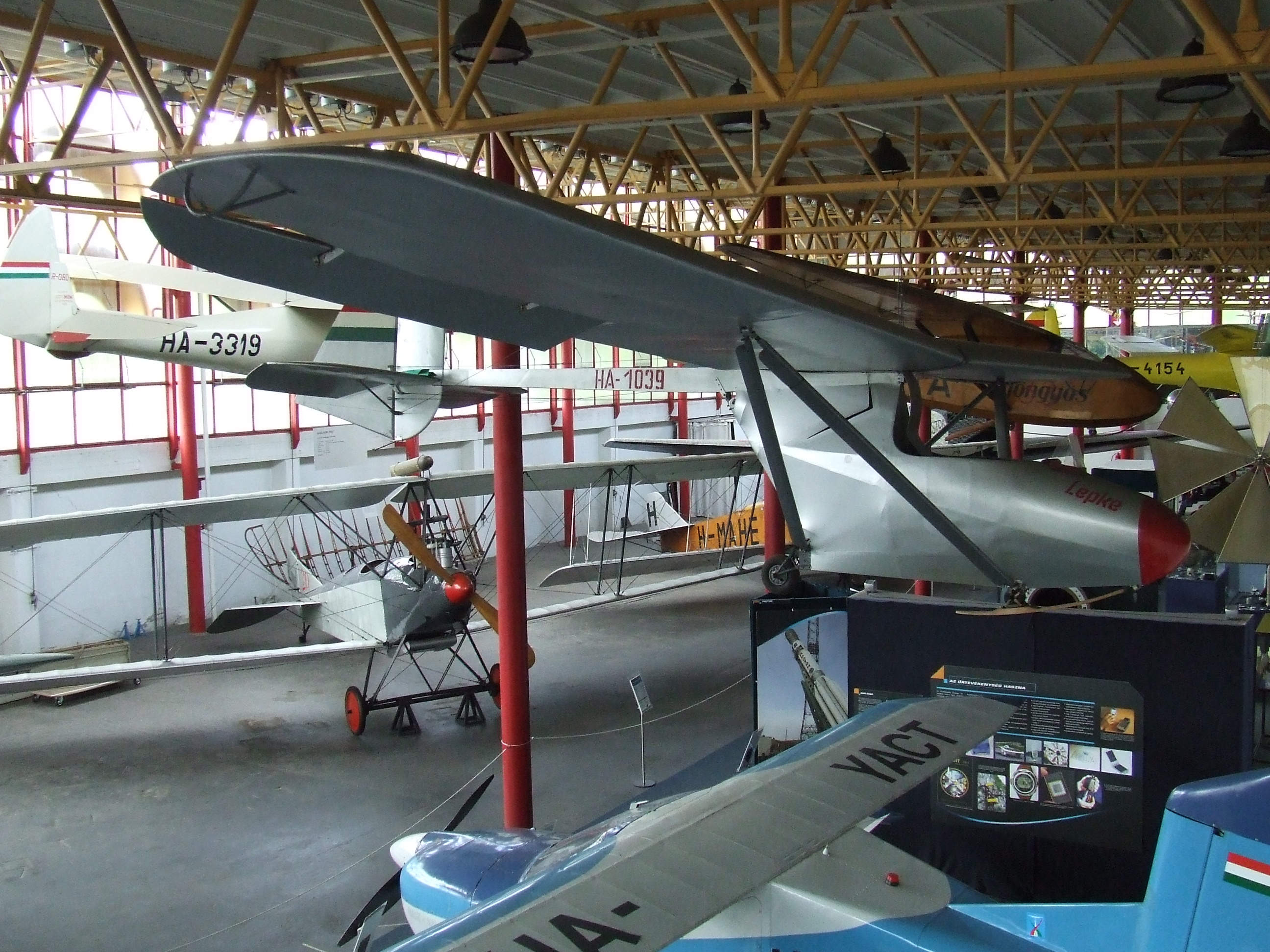
Lepke HA 1039

- R-16b Lepke HA-1039, Magyar Műszaki és Közlekedési Múzeum (Hungarian Technical and Transportation Museum), Budapest.

== Specifications (R-16b Lepke) ==
Data from Gabor, F

General characteristics

- Crew: One
- Length: 6.2 m (20 ft 4 in)
- Wingspan: 10 m (32 ft 10 in)
- Wing area: 12.84 m^{2} (138.2 sq ft)
- Aspect ratio: 7.8
- Airfoil: Götttingen Gö 549 out to modified tips
- Empty weight: 80 kg (176 lb)
- Gross weight: 145 kg (320 lb)

Performance

- Maximum speed: 110 km/h (68 mph, 59 kn) never exceed
- Stall speed: 42 km/h (26 mph, 23 kn)
- Maximum glide ratio: 14 at 61 km/h (38 mph; 33 kn)
- Rate of sink: 0.91 m/s (179 ft/min) minimum, at 50 km/h (31 mph; 27 kn)
- Maximum speed in rough air: 65 km/h (40 mph; 35 kn)
