= Rubik R-15 Koma =

Hungarian training glider

R-15b Koma
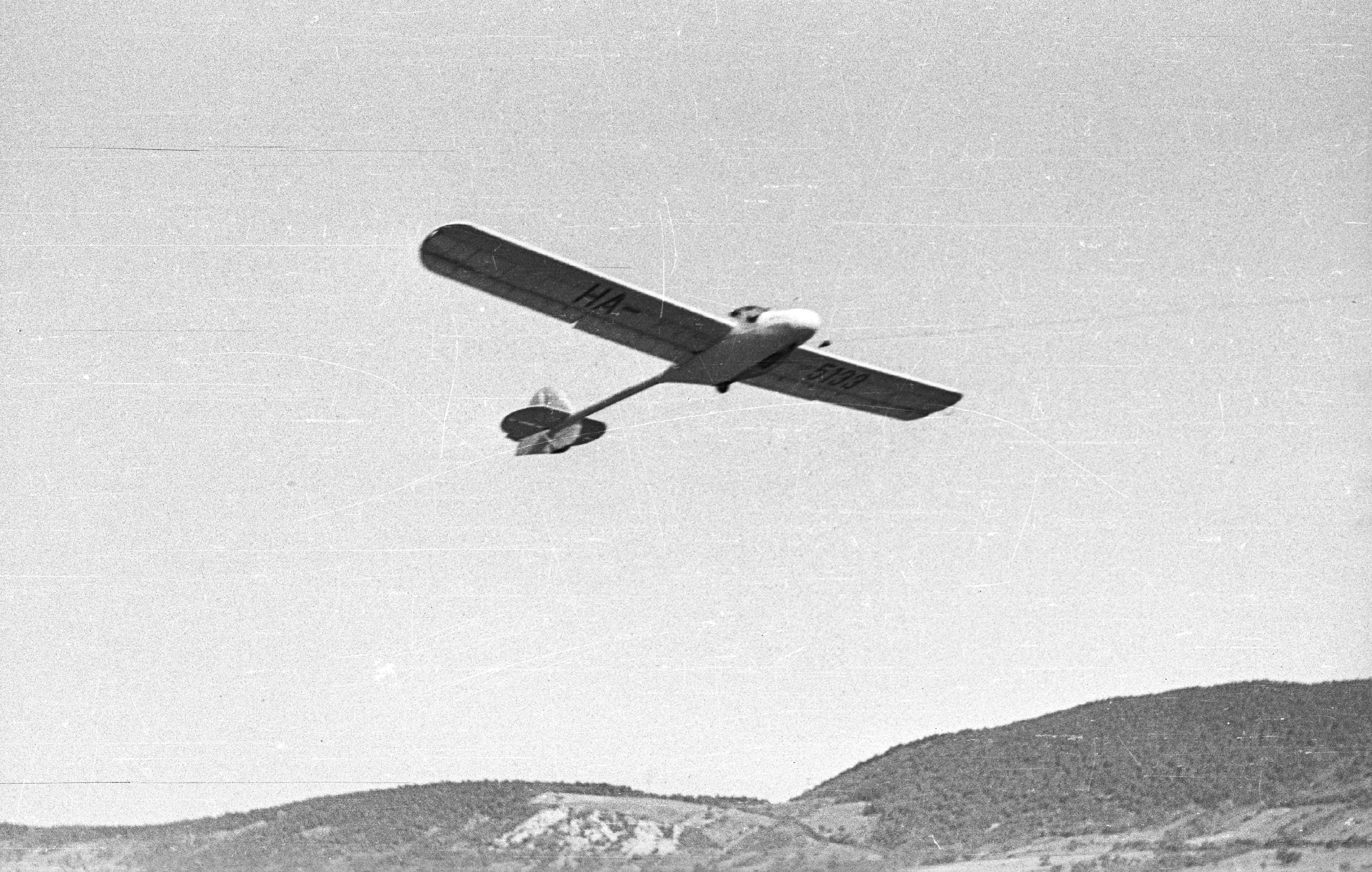
- Koma winch-launch.

General information
- Type: Side-by-side seat training glider
- National origin: Hungary
- Manufacturer: Sportárutermelő Vállalat, Esztergom.
- Designer: Ernő Rubik
- Number built: 68

History
- First flight: April 1949

The Rubik R-15 Koma (Godfather) was a side-by-side seat Hungarian training glider designed to introduce pilots to winch-launching techniques. A second, very similar but single seat design, the Rubik R-16 Lepke, provided follow-up solo experience of the same techniques. Pairs were widely used by Hungarian glider clubs post-war, with 65 of each produced.

== Design and development ==
In 1940 Ernő Rubik began to consider a glider flight training programme based on a pair of aircraft with similar flight characteristics and sharing many components but differing in their seating. Students would begin on the R-15 Koma, with side-by-side seating and the reassurance and guidance of a tutor watching, then go solo on the R-16 Lepke. During the war, the Hungarian National Aviation Association (Országos Magyar Repülö Egyesület or OMRE) chose to use his R-11 Cimbora and the Koma and Lepke designs were shelved until, in 1948, OMRE announced a competition for single seat and two seat trainers. By the end of the year Rubik's two designs had been chosen. The prototype Koma first flew in April 1949, followed by the Lepke in the summer.

The Koma was a pod-and-boom glider with a cantilever, mid-mounted wing which was rectangular in plan out to rounded tips and had 3° of dihedral. The wing was built around a single, wooden spar with wooden ribs; ply covering ahead of the spar formed a torsion-resistant D-box. The rest of the wing was fabric-covered. Diagonal drag struts near the root were made from steel tubes. Constant chord flaps and Handley Page slotted ailerons together filled the whole trailing edge, mounted on a light-metal tube false spar and fabric-covered. Flap settings were 5° for launching and 60° for landing. The wings could be folded back alongside the fuselage for transport.

The forward pod was built around two plywood, semi-circular, transverse frames mounted parallel to each other under the wing on a box-section beam which projected forward to the nose. This carried the two side-by-side seats, provided with dual controls, in an enclosed cockpit under a generously glazed, centrally hinged two-part canopy. It also mounted, on its underside, a semi-recessed monowheel, placed under the trailing edge on production aircraft (it was further forward on the prototype) with a short, rubber sprung landing skid ahead of it. From the aft of the beam a metal tube strut reached upwards and rearwards to support the boom that formed the rear fuselage. This tube was enclosed within the pod, which had ply-covered lower surfaces but was fabric-covered above. The upward sloping tailboom was a rectangular section, wooden, ply-covered structure mounted on the centre of the rear semi-circular frame, braced with wires from the inner wings as well as the metal tube from the lower fuselage. All Komas had a conventional tail and the production R-15b had a large, blunted triangular fin and rounded under-fin incorporating a small tailskid and carrying a roughly triangular, deep rudder. Its strut-braced tailplane was rectangular in plan with rounded tips and carried rounded elevators, centrally cut-away for rudder movement.

The prototype R-15 Koma first flew in April 1949. Flight trials revealed lateral instability when towed and so the single R-15a had a lengthened fuselage with a fin with its area increased by sweeping its previously upright leading edge forward, introducing the underfin and lowering the tailplane to the top of the fuselage. Its trials showed average students needed landing speeds reduced and so flaps were added to the R-15b Koma, first flown in June 1950, which went into series production. Sixty-five were built between 1950 and 1951, becoming the standard Hungarian, dual control, winch-launch trainer. It remained in operation well into the 1960s.

In 1957 Sportárutermelő Vállalat designers József Mihály, Lajos Bánvölgyi, Lajos Bende and Ferenc Major developed a light metal version of the Koma, the R-15F Fém-Koma (Metal-Koma), which flew in June 1958. The R-15F was very similar to the R-15b externally but there were some differences. The latter's rounded tips had been squared off, reducing the span by 650 mm (25.6 in) and it was 1,000 mm (39 in) longer. The cockpit canopy opened forward on a transverse hinge. The horizontal tail was also squared off and the fin had a narrow, rectangular profile. The R-15F was also about 11% heavier. Performances were close though the metal version had a higher V_{NE} and a slightly better glide ratio at a higher speed.

By June 1964 the sole Fém-Koma had made 6275 launches and flown for 520 hours.

== Variants ==
R-15 Koma
Prototype. One only
R-15a Koma
Larger rudder for aerotowing. One only.
R-15b Koma
Production model with landing flaps and further tail revisions.
R-15F Fém-Koma
All-metal variant. One only.

== Aircraft on display ==
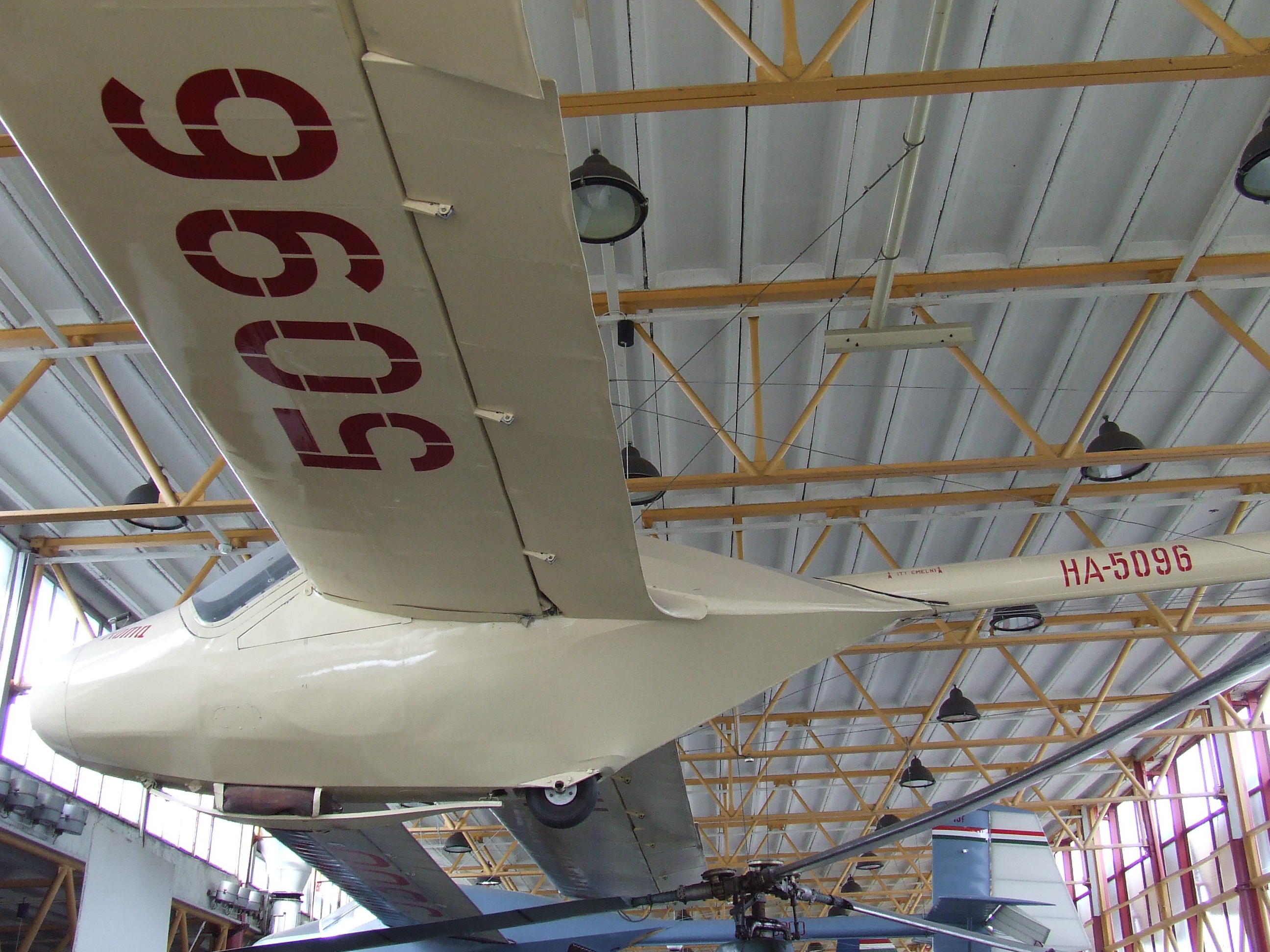
R-15b Koma in the Hungarian Technical and Transportation Museum

- R-15b Koma HA-5096, Magyar Műszaki és Közlekedési MúzeumHngarian (Hungarian Technical and Transportation Museum), Budapest.
- R-15F Fém-Koma HA-2300, Hungarian Technical and Transportation Museum, Budapest.

== Specifications (R-15b) ==
Data from Gabor, F

General characteristics

- Crew: Two
- Length: 7.0 m (23 ft 0 in)
- Wingspan: 14 m (45 ft 11 in)
- Wing area: 18.04 m^{2} (194.2 sq ft)
- Aspect ratio: 10.84
- Airfoil: Göttingen Gö 549
- Empty weight: 185 kg (408 lb)
- Gross weight: 340 kg (750 lb)

Performance

- Maximum speed: 130 km/h (81 mph, 70 kn)
- Stall speed: 56 km/h (35 mph, 30 kn)
- Maximum glide ratio: 17.4 at 70 km/h (43 mph; 38 kn)
- Rate of sink: 1.05 m/s (207 ft/min) minimum, at 63 km/h (39 mph; 34 kn)
- Maximum speed in rough air: 80 km/h (50 mph; 43 kn)
