= Midwest MU-1 =

MU-1

General information
- Type: Glider
- National origin: United States
- Designer: Arthur B. Schultz
- Status: No longer in production
- Primary user: United States Army Air Corps
- Number built: at least 6

History
- Variant: Schultz ABC

The Midwest MU-1 was an American single-seat, high-wing, strut-braced utility glider that was designed by Arthur B. Schultz in the 1930s.

== Design and development ==
The MU-1 was designed by Schultz prior to the Second World War and was used by the United States Army Air Corps for glider training and designated as the Midwest TG-18.

The MU-1 was constructed with a welded steel tube fuselage and a wooden-framed wings, all covered in doped aircraft fabric covering. The wing was of 36 ft (11.0 m) span, employed a NACA 4412 airfoil and was supported by two parallel struts with jury struts. Landing gear was a fixed monowheel.

The aircraft was type certified on 13 October 1944 and about six were completed by Midwest Sailplane and possibly also by the Motorless Flight Institute of Chicago, Illinois.

== Operational history ==
In 1983 Soaring Magazine reported that two MU-1s were still in existence, but in October 2015 only one was on the Federal Aviation Administration registry.

== Variants ==
MU-1
Standard model with 36 ft (11.0 m) wingspan and 172 sq ft (16.0 m^{2}) wing area
MU-1 long-wing
Version with a longer span, double-tapered wing of similar wing area. This model may have been a proposal only as completed examples have not been confirmed.
Schultz ABC
Developed from the MU-1, the ABC has a longer wingspan and higher glide ratio. It won the 1937 Eaton Design Competition
TG-18
Military designation for impressed MU-1 gliders used for glider pilot training.

== Operators ==
=== Military ===
- United States Army Air Corps

== Specifications (MU-1) ==
Data from Soaring and Glider Type Certificate 16

General characteristics

- Crew: one
- Wingspan: 36 ft 0 in (10.97 m)
- Wing area: 172 sq ft (16.0 m^{2})
- Aspect ratio: 7.5:1
- Airfoil: NACA 4412
- Empty weight: 323 lb (147 kg)
- Gross weight: 513 lb (233 kg)

Performance

- Never exceed speed: 80 mph (130 km/h, 70 kn)
- Maximum glide ratio: 15:1 at 36 mph (58 km/h)
- Rate of sink: 174 ft/min (0.88 m/s) at 30 mph (48 km/h)
- Wing loading: 3 lb/sq ft (15 kg/m^{2})

== See also ==
Related lists

- List of gliders
