= Rotondi R-2 Tobia =

R-2 Tobia
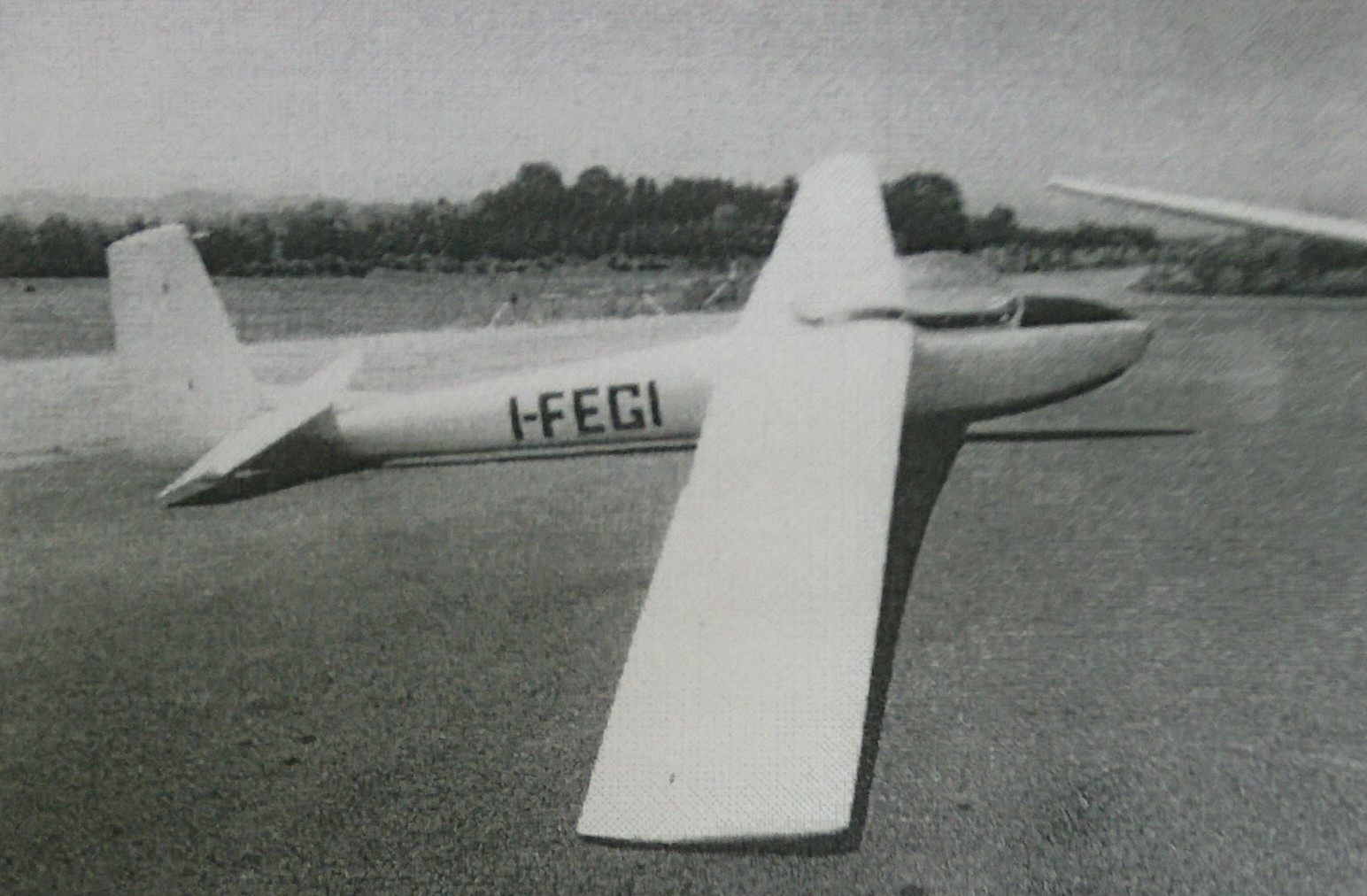

General information
- Type: Single seat glider
- National origin: Italy
- Manufacturer: Students of the G. Feltrinelli Technical Institute, Milan
- Designer: Gianfranco Rotondi
- Number built: 1

History
- First flight: 1962

The Rotondi R.2 Tobia was built as a student group project in an Italian technical institute, begun in 1958. The sole example of this single seat, wooden glider first flew in 1962.

== Design and development ==
The Tobia was specifically designed by Rotondi as the basis of an extended aircraft building project for the students of the aeronautical division of the G. Feltrinelli Technical Institute of Milan. This turned out to be a four-year exercise, beginning in 1958. It was a shoulder wing, single seat, wood and fabric glider with a single spar, straight tapered, square tipped wing. From the spar forwards the wing was plywood covered, forming a torsion resisting D-box; aft, it was fabric covered. Its ailerons were long and narrow, covering half the span. The inner parts of the wing carried mid-chord air brakes similar to those used on the influential DFS Olympia Meise.

The Tobia had an oval, almost circular cross section, fabric covered fuselage. Its long cockpit was centred on the wing leading edge and was covered by a single piece, teardrop shaped perspex canopy. The tail surfaces were straight tapered and square tipped with the tailplane and elevators mounted slightly above the fuselage on a dorsal fin fillet; the fin was tall and the rudder extended down to the keel and control surfaces were not aero-dynamically balanced. The Tobia had a retractable monowheel undercarriage, with a landing skid ahead of it to the nose.

The sole Tobia's first flight was made in 1962. Later, wing fitting damage sustained in a heavy landing ended its career.

== Specifications ==
Data from Pedrellli (2011) p.223

General characteristics

- Capacity: One
- Length: 6.0 m (19 ft 8 in)
- Wingspan: 13.60 m (44 ft 7 in)
- Wing area: 12.15 m^{2} (130.8 sq ft)
- Aspect ratio: 15
- Empty weight: 140 kg (309 lb)
- Gross weight: 250 kg (551 lb)

Performance

- Maximum glide ratio: estimated. 25:1
- Wing loading: 20.6 kg/m^{2} (4.2 lb/sq ft)
