= R.F.D. 2 =

British single-seat glider, 1931

General information
- Type: Secondary glider/sailplane
- National origin: UK
- Manufacturer: R.F.D. Ltd, Guildford
- Designer: R. F. Dagnall and J. P. Bewsher
- Number built: 1

History
- First flight: February 1931

The R.F.D. 2 was a single seat, wooden sailplane built in the UK in 1930. Interchangeable centre sections allowed it to be configured either as a sailplane or a shorter span secondary (advanced training) glider. Only one was completed.

== Design and development ==
Named for design lead Reginald Foster Dagnall, the all-wood R.F.D. 2's unusual dual span cantilever wing had outer sections with constant chord, slight sweep, blunt tips and full width ailerons, joined by a choice of two rectangular centre sections. The sailplane centre section was about 15 ft (4.57 m) long, reduced to about 5 ft (1.52 m) for the secondary trainer role. The wing was not fitted with flaps or airbrakes.

The fuselage of the R.F.D. 2 was a flat-sided monocoque with the wing mounted directly on top of it. The single seat open cockpit was immediately ahead of the wing leading edge. The main landing skid ran from the nose to about mid-chord and there was a small tail skid. The triangular tailplane, mounted on top of the fuselage, and curved fin were both small but carried generous, curved edged control surfaces. The rudder extended to the bottom of the fuselage, moving between the elevators.

The R.F.D. 2 first flew in February 1931 but seems not to have received certification or registration. Only one had been built when, in January 1932, the R.F.D. company announced it was selling its glider interests to the British Aircraft Company and would concentrate on its products for the Air Ministry.

== Specifications ==
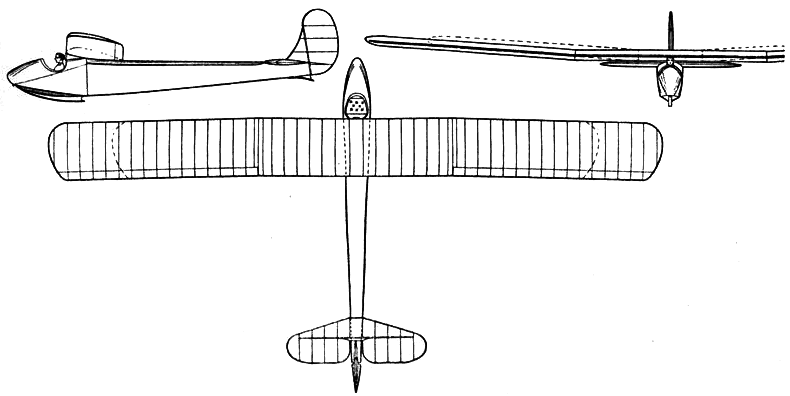
R.F.D. 2 3-view drawing from l'Aerophile May 1931

Data from British gliders and sailplanes 1922-1970

General characteristics

- Length: 26 ft 3 in (8.00 m)
- Wingspan: 48 ft 0 in (14.63 m) long span; short span 38 ft 0 in (11.58 m)
- Wing area: 210.0 sq ft (19.51 m^{2}) long span; short span 165 sq ft (15.33 sq m)
- Aspect ratio: Long span 11.0; short span 8.45
- Empty weight: 250 lb (113 kg) long span; short span 215 lb (97.5 kg)
- Gross weight: 410 lb (186 kg) long span

Performance

- Rate of sink: 120 ft/min (0.61 m/s) maximum, long span; short span 150 ft/min (0.76 m/s)
- Lift-to-drag: Minimum, long span 23.4 at 32 mph (51 km/h); short span 20.4 at 34.7 mph (55 km/h)
- Wing loading: 1.85 lb/sq ft (9.0 kg/m^{2}) long span
