= Rotter Karakán =

Karakán
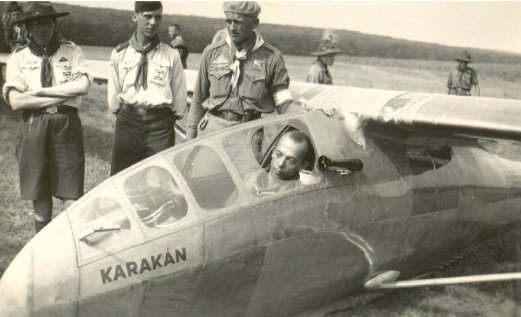

General information
- Type: Single-seat high performance glider
- National origin: Hungary
- Manufacturer: "Ezermester" Boy Scout Group/MOVERO workshop
- Designer: Lajos Rotter
- Number built: 2

History
- First flight: 4 August 1933
- Developed into: Rotter Nemere

The Rotter Karakán or just the Karakán was a high performance Hungarian single seat sailplane. Two were built and set many national gliding records in the years before World War II.

== Design ==
Like several other glider designers of the early 1930s, Lajos Rotter was impressed by Alexander Lippisch's Wien of 1929 and his high performance, single seat Karakán bears its influence. Like the Wien, the Karakán was a high aspect ratio sailplane with a two-piece high wing with a rectangular plan centre section and long, straight tapered outer panels. Both had thick section wings at the root which became progressively thinner over the outer panels. On both designs, ailerons occupied the whole trailing edge of these outer panels. Structurally, the wings were similar, with two spars of unequal strength; the forward spar beams were part of plywood covered D-boxes around the leading edges and the rear spar was a lighter simple beam. The wings were fabric covered behind the main spar, as were the ailerons. Both designs had, on each side, an airfoil-faired V-form strut from the lower fuselage to the outer ends of the centre section, the forward member of the V, connected to the main spar, was more substantial than the rear.

At a more detailed level, there were many differences between the two aircraft. The Karakán's wing had a greater span and area. Lippisch had a used standard Göttingen airfoil whereas Rotter used one of his own, though both designers chose to merge into more symmetric profiles outboard. The Karakán was the heavier of the two, with the higher wing loading. The major differences were in the forward part of the semi-monocoque, ply-covered fuselages; the Karakán replaced the open Wien cockpit with one enclosed under a removable, wood framed canopy, with four transparent panels on each side, which maintained the smoothly increasing fuselage section. The rearmost canopy transparencies, on either side of the pilot's seat, had large oval holes in them but the Karakán was one of the first gliders with enclosed seating. Drag from the wing/fuselage junction troubled designers of the day and Lippisch mounted the wings of the Wien from a parallel sided pylon rising rather abruptly from the fuselage; Rotter extended the upper fuselage frames smoothly inwards then outwards into a stub wing, with a span about the same as the maximum 570 mm (22.4 in) fuselage width, to ease the transition from fuselage to wing. The fuselages of both designs became slender rearwards, the Wien's more than the Karakán; sections through the latter's fuselage were more biconvex or almond shaped than the Wien's oval, making it 30 mm (1.2 in) narrower. The Wien and the Karakán had very similar vertical tails, with balanced rudders, large and rounded apart from a straight underside to avoid the ground, mounted on small, short fins. Both had all-moving tailplanes mounted close to mid-fuselage, though of different plans. Like most sailplanes of the time, both landed on a single skid, the Karakán's rather longer, with a small metal tailskid to protect the rear fuselage.

== Operational history ==
The Karakán was designed at the request of the Hungarian Boy Scouts Association, which wanted a new Hungarian glider to represent the sport at the 1933 Jamboree. It was built in their workshops and made its first flight on 4 August 1933, during the Jamboree. A second Karakán was built in the workshops of the Aviation Section of the Hungarian Defence Association (MOVERO), flying on 29 April 1935. Between them they set a series of Hungarian national gliding records and Rotter used it to become the first Hungarian to gain a Silver C. When the first example retired in 1939 it was placed on display in the Hungarian Technical and Transportation Museum, Budapest, where it was destroyed in the fighting towards the end of World War II. The second was destroyed in a hangar fire in 1942.

== Specifications ==
Data from Simons (2006)

General characteristics

- Crew: One
- Length: 7.97 m (26 ft 2 in)
- Wingspan: 20.00 m (65 ft 7 in)
- Wing area: 21.05 m^{2} (226.6 sq ft)
- Aspect ratio: 19
- Empty weight: 230 kg (507 lb)
- Gross weight: 330 kg (728 lb)

Performance

- Wing loading: 15.7 kg/m^{2} (3.2 lb/sq ft)
