= Rotondi R-1 Gheppio =

R-1 Gheppio

General information
- Type: Single seat glider
- National origin: Italy
- Designer: Gianfranco Rotondi
- Status: Sole example destroyed
- Number built: 1

History
- First flight: 1952

The Rotondi R-1 Gheppio (English: Kestrel) was a lightweight, single seat Italian glider. It featured a relatively short wingspan (ten meters). One example was built in the early 1950s.

== Development ==
The Ghoppia was a cantilever mid-wing monoplane. Its straight tapered wing was built in one piece for lightness around a single spar and had marked dihedral. The outer half of the wing's trailing edge carried ailerons mounted on a false spar; trailing edge airbrakes occupied the inner portion of the wingspan. These airbrakes turned out to be rather ineffective. The wing terminated in small tip bodies.

The fuselage was built in two sections that bolted together. It was ovoid in cross-section, tapering aft to a conventional but integral tail. The fin was straight edged with a rounded tip and a small fillet at its base. Its rudder extended down to the keel. The tailplane was mounted on the fin near the top of the fillet, carrying elevators that had a large cut-out for rudder movement. The Ghoppia's cockpit was over the wing, under a rather prominent canopy which opened by sliding rearwards. This had perspex transparencies forwards and to the sides but was opaque rearwards and above. A skid, reaching aft to about mid-chord, and a tail bumper formed the undercarriage.

Partly due to the single-piece wing, the Ghoppia was unusually light with an empty weight of only 80 kg (176 lb).

== Operational history ==
The Ghoppia was first flown from Bresso, then later from Linate, sometimes launched by aerotow. The sole example was lost in an out-landing accident during a competition organised by the aeroclub of Milan.

== Specifications ==
Data from Pedrielli (2011) p. 221

General characteristics

- Capacity: One
- Length: 5.50 m (18 ft 1 in)
- Wingspan: 10.0 m (32 ft 10 in)
- Wing area: 8.0 m^{2} (86 sq ft)
- Aspect ratio: 12.5
- Empty weight: 80 kg (176 lb)
- Gross weight: 160 kg (353 lb)

Performance

- Maximum glide ratio: estimated, 23:1
- Wing loading: 20.0 kg/m^{2} (4.1 lb/sq ft)
