= Rotter Nemere =

Nemere
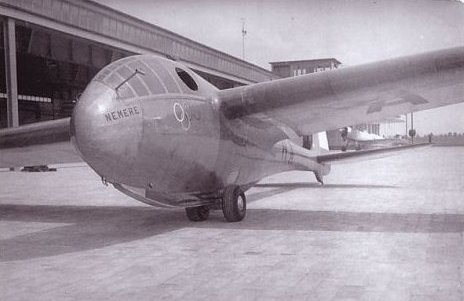
- The Nemere after the Berlin-Kiel flight, on launch dolly

General information
- Type: High performance sailplane
- National origin: Hungary
- Manufacturer: Royal Hungarian Repair Works
- Designer: Lajos Rotter
- Number built: 1

History
- First flight: 25 July 1936
- Developed from: Rotter Karakán

The Rotter Nemere or just Nemere was a Hungarian high performance, single seat sailplane designed and built for the 1936 ISTUS gliding demonstration held in 1936 alongside the Berlin Olympic Games.

== Design and development ==
The ISTUS international soaring demonstration was held at the same time and in the same place as the 1936 Olympics to make the case for gliding's inclusion as an Olympic discipline at later Games. The proposition was accepted and there would have been gliding events at the 1940 Olympics had not World War II intervened. Rotter, using his experience of designing the successful Karakán, was responsible for both designing and flying the Nemere, Hungary's representative.

The Nemere's progression from the Karakán was most evident in the wing and its mounting. The modified pedestal mounting to the fuselage had gone and instead the Nemere had a shoulder wing mounted on a 1,150 mm (45.3 in) span centre section built as part of the fuselage. The wing was a cantilever structure, without the earlier lift struts, continuously tapered in plan from root to tip with no externally distinct centre section and with 2° of dihedral. There was continuous taper in wing section also; Rotter returned to Göttingen airfoils using Gö 646 with a thickness to chord of 19% at the root, varying through Gö 535 to a thinner, less cambered, tip. Like the Karakán, the Nemere had a plywood covered D-box ahead of the main spar but, with the external struts absent, plywood covered more of the inner wing back to a diagonal internal drag strut. The wings were fabric covered aft. Broad chord ailerons occupied the outer 60% of the wings, which ended in elliptical tips.

The fuselage was a ply-covered semi-monocoque, teardrop shaped in cross-section, which tapered markedly behind the wing. The canopy was a wood framed multi-transparency unit, similar to that on the Karakán, but with more panels, which preserved the contours of the upper forward fuselage back almost to the wing leading edge. The tail was conventional, with an all-moving tailplane, mostly fabric covered. The rudder, mounted on a short, narrow fin, was balanced, rounded and full. The Nemere took off from a small, two wheeled dolly and landed on a long skid under the forward fuselage, assisted by s steel tailskid at the rear.

The Nemere flew for the first time on 25 July 1936 only a few days before the demonstrations held at Berlin-Staaken airfield on 4 August. Sailplanes from Austria, Bulgaria, Germany, Italy, Switzerland and Yugoslavia flew alongside the Nemere. A week later, starting from Rangsdorf some 24 km (15 mi) south of Berlin, Rotter made a flight to Kiel where the sailing events of the Games were based. He had nominated his objective the day before and covered the 326.5 km (202.9 mi) in 3 hrs 53 min. It was the longest glider flight in Europe in 1936 and won Rotter an ISTUS Gold medal.

On 13 June 1937 the Nemere was damaged in a bungee-cord launch and was rebuilt with Göppingen airbrakes, the aileron joint adjusting lever, previously behind the pilot's head, moved under the instrument panel and the rear canopy oval side-opening replaced with a rectangular aperture.

The Nemere continued in use until at least 1943, mostly slope soaring near its base at Toros, west of Budapest A few long-distance cross-country flights were made, including one of 230 km (143 mi) from Hármashatár-hegy in Budapest to Ciucea in west Romania, though no more records were set. Later in World War II it was slightly damaged but was restored to flying condition. In 1948 it was ordered by political leaders to be burned and its metal parts to be melted. All design documents of known location were destroyed. The fate of the aircraft obviously could neither be included in the book about Hungarian sailplanes because of censorship, nor to be spoken out publicly until 1990.

The replica of the plane is being rebuilt based on the original plans in Börgönd airport by enthusiasts.

== Specifications ==
Data from Simons(2006) pp.194-5

General characteristics

- Crew: One
- Length: 8.00 m (26 ft 3 in)
- Wingspan: 20.00 m (65 ft 7 in)
- Wing area: 23 m^{2} (250 sq ft)
- Aspect ratio: 17.39
- Airfoil: Göttingen 646 at root, Göttingen 535 immediately inboard of the ailerons and thinner and less cambered at the tip
- Empty weight: 340 kg (750 lb)
- Gross weight: 440 kg (970 lb)

Performance

- Maximum glide ratio: 26:1 at 75 km/h (47 mph; 40 kn)
- Rate of sink: 0.63 m/s (124 ft/min) minimum at 55 km/h (34 mph; 30 kn)
- Wing loading: 19.15 kg/m^{2} (3.92 lb/sq ft)
