= RP2 (gene) =

Protein-coding gene in humans

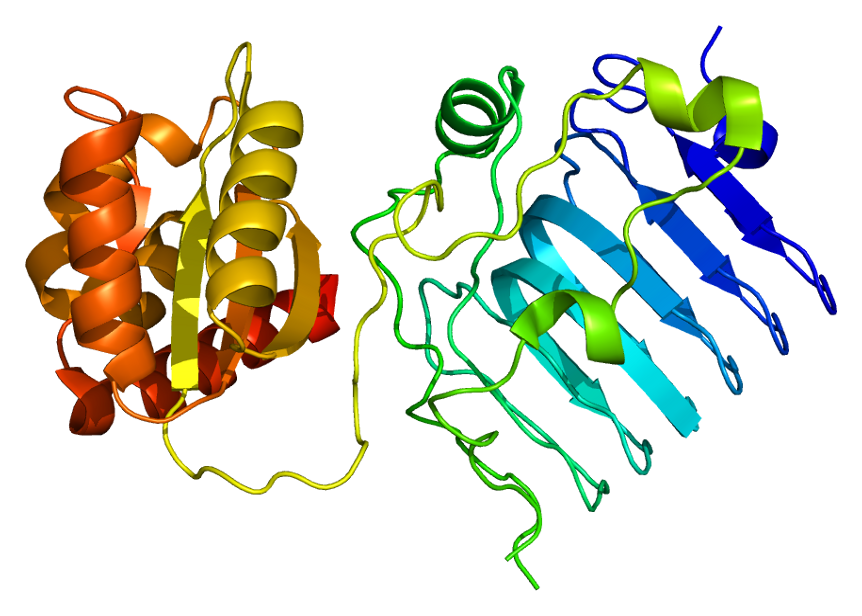
Available structures
PDB	Ortholog search: PDBe RCSB
PDB	List of PDB id codes 2BX6, 3BH6, 3BH7

Identifiers
- Aliases: RP2, DELXp11.3, NM23-H10, NME10, TBCCD2, Xretinitis pigmentosa 2 (X-linked recessive), ARL3 GTPase activating protein, RP2 activator of ARL3 GTPase
- External IDs: OMIM: 300757; MGI: 1277953; HomoloGene: 5042; GeneCards: RP2; OMA:RP2 - orthologs

Gene location (Human)
Chr.	X chromosome (human)
Band	Xp11.3	Start	46,837,043 bp
Band	Xp11.3	End	46,882,358 bp

Gene location (Mouse)
Chr.	X chromosome (mouse)
Band	X|X A1.3	Start	20,230,720 bp
Band	X|X A1.3	End	20,271,892 bp
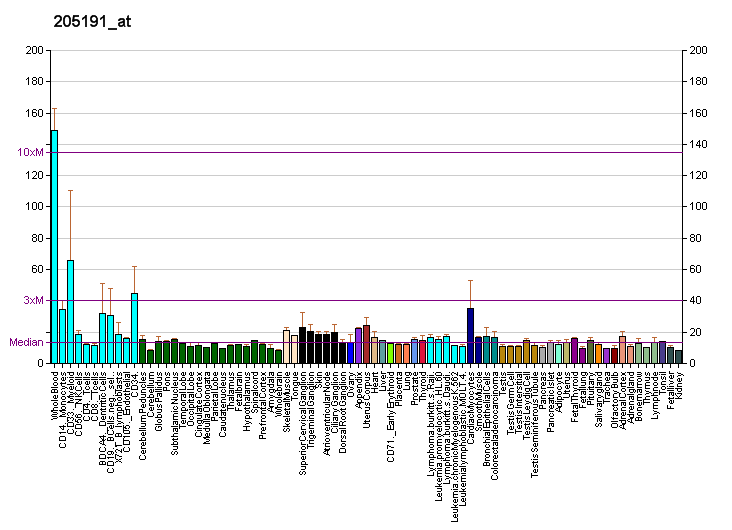
RNA expression pattern
Bgee	Human / Mouse (ortholog); Top expressed in: monocyte; jejunal mucosa; bone marrow; blood; mucosa of sigmoid colon; ventricular zone; bone marrow cells; lower lobe of lung; appendix; gallbladder / Top expressed in: olfactory epithelium; Epithelium of choroid plexus; granulocyte; spermatid; blood; seminal vesicula; mesenteric lymph nodes; spleen; medial ganglionic eminence; left colon; More reference expression data
BioGPS	More reference expression data
Gene ontology
Molecular function	nucleotide binding; unfolded protein binding; GTP binding; protein binding; GTPase activator activity; magnesium ion binding
Cellular component	cytoplasm; ciliary basal body; Golgi apparatus; cell projection; membrane; plasma membrane; periciliary membrane compartment; centriole; extracellular exosome; cytoplasmic vesicle; nucleoplasm; cilium; nuclear body
Biological process	post-chaperonin tubulin folding pathway; post-Golgi vesicle-mediated transport; protein folding; protein transport; visual perception; positive regulation of GTPase activity; transport; cell morphogenesis
Sources:Amigo / QuickGO
Orthologs
Species	Human	Mouse
Entrez	6102	19889
Ensembl	ENSG00000102218	ENSMUSG00000060090
UniProt	O75695	Q9EPK2
RefSeq (mRNA)	NM_006915	NM_001290643; NM_001290644; NM_133669
RefSeq (protein)	NP_008846	NP_001277572; NP_001277573; NP_598430
Location (UCSC)	Chr X: 46.84 – 46.88 Mb	Chr X: 20.23 – 20.27 Mb
PubMed search
- Wikidata
View/Edit Human	View/Edit Mouse

Protein XRP2 is a protein that in humans is encoded by the RP2 gene.

== Function ==
The RP2 locus has been implicated as one cause of X-linked retinitis pigmentosa. The predicted gene product shows homology with human cofactor C, a protein involved in the ultimate step of beta-tubulin folding. Progressive retinal degeneration may therefore be due to the accumulation of incorrectly folded photoreceptor or neuron-specific tubulin isoforms, followed by progressive cell death. The RP2 protein is also involved in regulating the function and extension of the outer segment of cone photoreceptors in mice.
