= Rubik R-17 Móka =

Hungarian aerobatic glider

R-17 Móka

General information
- Type: Aerobatic glider
- National origin: Hungary
- Manufacturer: Aero-Ever Ltd
- Designer: Ernő Rubik
- Number built: 3

History
- First flight: Spring 1944

The Rubik R-17 Móka (Joy) was a Hungarian aerobatic glider designed in the late 1930s. One prototype was built and first flown in 1944 but was destroyed near the end of World War II. Two more, with modified ailerons and a new fuselage, were built in 1950 but were abandoned after a fatal accident.

== Development ==
The design of the Móka was started in 1937, a year after the first flights of the German DFS Habicht, one of the earliest fully aerobatic gliders, and was rather similar in appearance though different in construction. The Móka did not fly until the spring of 1944. There was a brief period of flight tests, during which the R-17, designed to be capable of 520 km/h (320 mph; 280 kn) was limited to 400 km/h (250 mph; 220 kn) to avoid flutter. These flights revealed very heavy aileron stick loads. It was destroyed in the Siege of Budapest, December 1944-February 1945.

The R-17b, redesigned to lower mass as well as improve handling with new ailerons, was built by Aero-Ever Ltd's successor, Sportárutermelő Vállalat (Sporting Goods Factory). They began a batch of three, the first flying in 1950. When test flown the R-17b showed aileron flutter, not experienced with the R-17, which was strong enough to wrest the control stick from the pilot causing a crash. The second aircraft fared worse. Its pilot was killed pulling out of a high speed dive, when strong aileron flutter resulted in wing breakup. Development was stopped immediately and no more were built.

== Design ==
The R-17 had a one-piece cantilever, mid-mounted gull wing, trapezoidal in plan out to rounded tips. The inner 25% of the span had 8° of dihedral, the rest 1° of anhedral. The wing was built around a single main spar, with plywood covering ahead of it forming a torsion resistant D-box; three secondary spars behind it dealt with the stresses of aerobatics. Spoilers were mounted on the main spar just beyond the change in dihedral. On the prototype these were of the Göppingen-type bur Rubik's own spoiler design was used on the R-17b. The outer trailing edges carried balanced, slotted, differential ailerons which could be lowered together by 5° for slower landings. The one-piece ailerons of the R-17 were wooden but the R-17b's divided ailerons were light-metal framed and fabric-covered. They also had longer spans and narrower chords, with Frise-type leading edges for balancing. They filled the whole trailing edges of the outer wings, their inner sections deflecting more than the outer parts. These aileron modifications were a response to the heavy stick forces encountered with the prototype.

The fuselage of the R-17 had an elliptical cross-section. The pilot sat just ahead of the leading edge in an open cockpit which had a removable cover with built-in windscreen. Raised immediately behind to provide a headrest, the fuselage fell away aft. In contrast the R-17g had a Rubik-R-22S fuselage with a cockpit covered by a bubble canopy, behind which the upper fuselage ran horizontally rearwards. As a result the cross-section became increasingly flattened at the top.

Both variants landed on a semi-recessed monowheel under the wing at about one-third chord, assisted by a rubber-sprung skid ahead of it to the nose and a small tail skid. They also had very similar tails, with slightly sloped, straight-edged fins and nearly quadrantal rudders. Narrow, parallel chord tailplanes were mounted just above the fuselage and braced from below by a single strut on each side. The elevators were tapered and rounded toward the tips. One difference was a small elevator trim tab added on the starboard side on the R-17b. The horizontal tails could folded upwards for easier transport.

== Variants ==
R-17
Sole wartime prototype.
R-17b
Postwar model with new, R-22S fuselage and revised ailerons. Three were started but only two completed.

== Specifications (R-17) ==
Data from Gabor, F

General characteristics

- Crew: One
- Length: 6.5 m (21 ft 4 in)
- Wingspan: 13 m (42 ft 8 in)
- Wing area: 16 m^{2} (170 sq ft)
- Aspect ratio: 10.5
- Airfoil: NACA 23012 out to NACA 0009 tipss
- Empty weight: 250 kg (551 lb)
- Gross weight: 350 kg (772 lb)

Performance

- Maximum speed: 360 km/h (220 mph, 190 kn) VNE
- Stall speed: 65 km/h (40 mph, 35 kn)
- Maximum glide ratio: 22 at 93 km/h (58 mph; 50 kn)
- Rate of sink: 0.88 m/s (173 ft/min) minimum, at 70 km/h (43 mph; 38 kn)
- Maximumum speed in rough air: 120 km/h (75 mph; 65 kn)
