= Rensselaer RP-3 =

American glider

RP-3

General information
- Type: Glider
- National origin: United States
- Manufacturer: Rensselaer Polytechnic Institute
- Designer: Brian E. Thompson
- Status: Sole example on display in the New York State Museum
- Number built: one

History
- Introduction date: 1998

The Rensselaer RP-3 (for Rensselaer Polytechnic design 3) is an American mid-wing, T-tailed single-seat, glider that was designed by Brian E. Thompson and produced by the Rensselaer Polytechnic Institute of Troy, New York. It first flew in 1998.

== Design and development ==
The RP-3 was the third aircraft design in Rensselaer's Composite Aircraft Program and was completed in 1998.

The aircraft is of composite construction. Its 54 ft (16.5 m) span wing employs a Wortmann FX-67-K170/17 airfoil and features split flaps. The landing gear is a retractable monowheel, with an auxiliary tailwheel. The aircraft is considerably larger and heavier than its predecessors, the RP-1 and RP-2, with an empty weight of 650 lb (295 kg) and a gross weight of 1,000 lb (454 kg). Despite its large wingspan the RP-3 achieved only a 32:1 glide ratio.

Only one RP-3 was built and it was registered with the Federal Aviation Administration in the Experimental - Amateur-built category.

== Aircraft on display ==
- New York State Museum

== Specifications (RP-3) ==
Data from Sailplane Directory

General characteristics

- Crew: one
- Wingspan: 54 ft 0 in (16.46 m)
- Wing area: 179.76 sq ft (16.700 m^{2})
- Aspect ratio: 17:1
- Airfoil: Wortmann FX-67-K170/17
- Empty weight: 650 lb (295 kg)
- Gross weight: 1,000 lb (454 kg)

Performance

- Maximum glide ratio: 32:1 at 51 mph (82 km/h)
- Rate of sink: 136 ft/min (0.69 m/s) at 45 mph (72 km/h)
- Wing loading: 5.56 lb/sq ft (27.1 kg/m^{2})

== See also ==
Related lists

- List of gliders
