= Rubik R-31 Dupla =

Hungarian side-by-side seat training glider

R-31 Dupla
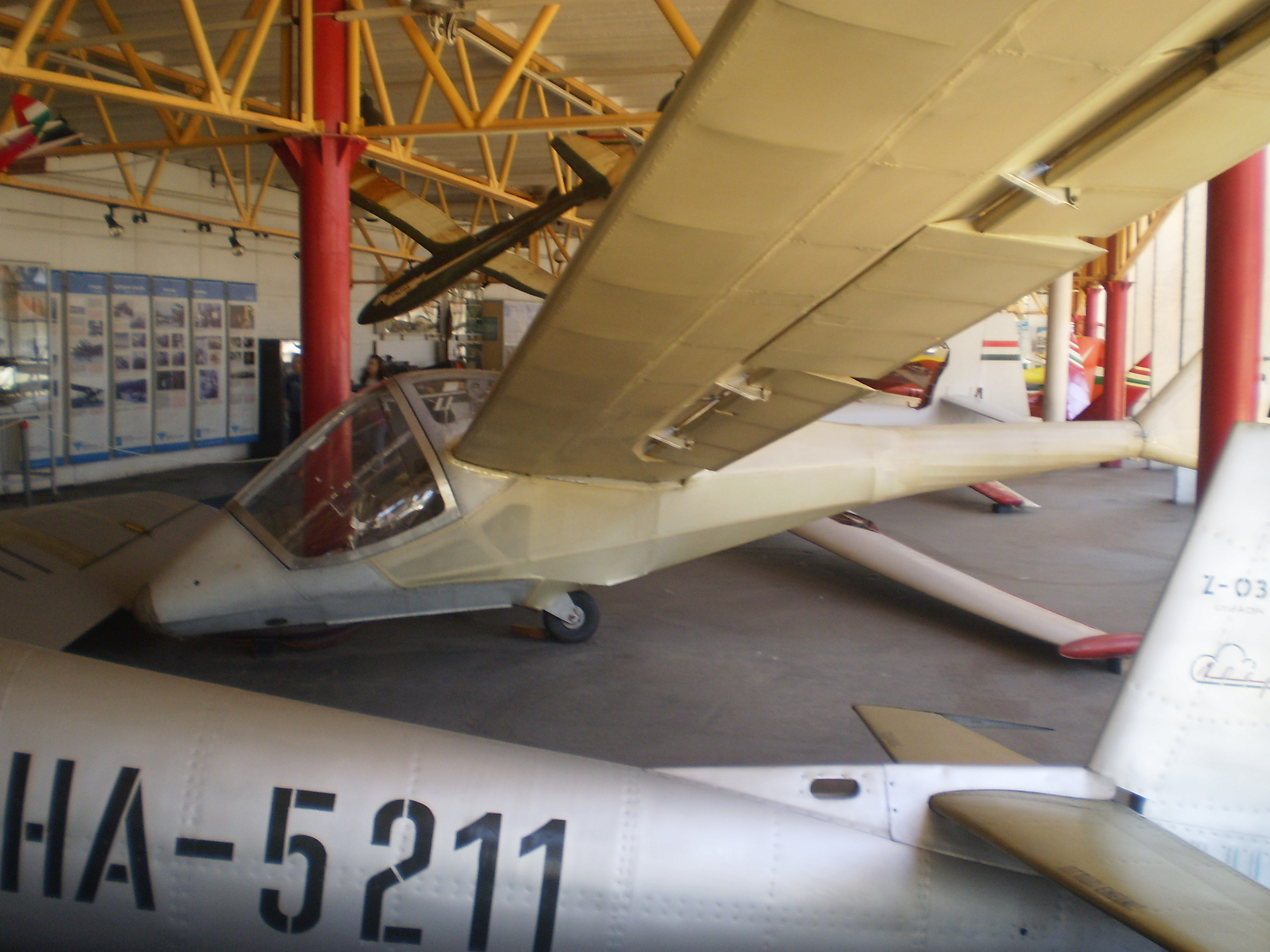

General information
- Type: Two-seat training glider
- National origin: Hungary
- Manufacturer: Begun by the designer, completed in the workshop of the National Civil Defence Association (MHSz), Budaörs
- Designer: Ernő Rubik
- Number built: 1

History
- First flight: 1983
- Retired: 1986

The Rubik R-31 Dupla (Double) was a Hungarian side-by-side seat training glider first flown in 1983. Disappointing performance and vibration problems prevented it going into production.

== Design and development ==
Ernő Rubik had designed many gliders but by the 1980s had been retired a long time. His Dupla was intended as a light, low cost basic trainer to replace his widely used R-26 Góbé, which was coming to the end of its useful life having entered service in 1963. He began its construction in his own garage but later the Hungarian Defence League (Magyar Honvédelmi Szövetség or MHSz) offered help in their Budaörs workshops. It was first flown in 1983.

The Dupla had a mid-mounted wing of rectangular plan out to rounded tips. The half-wings were built around single dural spars with Rubik's characteristic corrugated skin, first used some twenty-five years earlier on the R-23 Gébics, ahead of it around the leading edge forming a torsion resistant D-box. Diagonal, internal drag struts took loads from spar to fuselage. Behind the spar the wing was fabric covered. Small underwing skids protected the tips. Slotted ailerons, occupying about 40% of the trailing edge, projected a little beyond the tips, where they were upswept. Immediately inboard of the ailerons there were trailing edge mounted split-flap-type airbrakes with extreme deflections of ±90° The inboard third of the trailing edge had conventional slotted flaps.

The Dupla's forward fuselage was built around a tubular structure and covered in a mixture of light-metal and canvas. Pupil and instructor sat side by side, sharing some controls. There was a single, control column, operated by individual levers in front of each seat via a parallelogram linkage and the airbrake lever was on the centreline of the fixed, rear part of the cockpit transparencies. The forward part of the canopy hinged open. Behind the wing the fuselage was a slender cone covered with dural plate and tapering to a conventional tail with a short but broad fin. A triangular tailplane was strut-braced to it, well above the fuselage, and carried essentially rectangular fabric covered elevators. The fin also mounted an angular, balanced rudder which, like the elevators, was fabric covered.

The principal landing gear was a fixed monowheel aft of mid-chord. Forward of it, a skid protected the fuselage underside, assisted by a small tailskid on an extension of the fin below the fuselage.

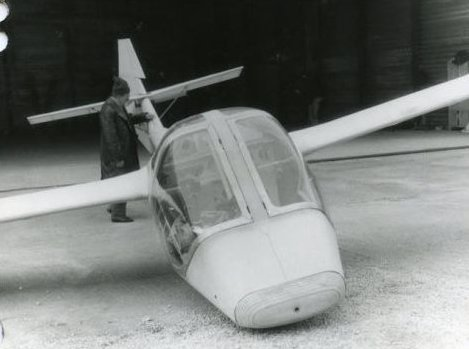

== Operational history ==
Flying under only temporary certification, the Dupla made twenty-six flights, with a total of eight flight hours, between 1983 and 1986. Its performance was poorer than that of the Góbé it was intended to replace, its handling characteristics did not prepare students for gliders like the SZD-30 Pirat and vibration problems persisted at all speeds, so testing was terminated in 1986.

== Aircraft on display ==
- R-31 Dupla (prototype), Hungarian Technical and Transportation Museum.

== Specifications ==
Data from Gabor, F (1988)

General characteristics

- Crew: Two
- Length: 7.5 m (24 ft 7 in)
- Wingspan: 13.0 m (42 ft 8 in)
- Wing area: 15.0 m^{2} (161 sq ft)
- Aspect ratio: 11.3
- Empty weight: 188 kg (414 lb)
- Gross weight: 390 kg (860 lb)
- Dihedral: 3°

Performance

- Maximum speed: 160 km/h (99 mph, 86 kn) VNE; maximum speed with airbrakes open
- Stall speed: 55 km/h (34 mph, 30 kn)
- Maximum glide ratio: 22
- Rate of sink: 1.3 m/s (260 ft/min) approximately, minimum. at 72 km/h (45 mph; 39 kn)
- Maximum speed in rough air: 140 km/h (87 mph; 76 kn)
