= Ross RH-3 =

American glider

RH-3

General information
- Type: Glider
- National origin: United States
- Manufacturer: Marvin Hicks
- Designer: Harland Ross
- Primary user: Marvin Hicks
- Number built: One

History
- First flight: 1 January 1963
- Developed from: Ross R-2

The Ross RH-3 is a single seat, mid-wing glider that was designed by Harland Ross.

== Design and development ==
Ross designed the R-3 as simplified version of the Ross R-2 Ibis with the intention of making the aircraft type easier to construct for amateur builders. The fuselage remained similar to the R-2, but the wing was redesigned as a straight wing, in contrast to the R-2's complex gull wing. The R-3 design was intended to be of all-wooden construction and employed a NACA 23018 airfoil section. Ross never constructed an example of the R-3.

Marvin Hicks of Aurora, Colorado purchased a set of plans and built a modified version of the aircraft over a ten-year period, culminating in a first flight on 1 January 1963. Hicks' aircraft used an increased span wing with flaps and a NACA 63 (3)-618 laminar flow airfoil. He designated the aircraft as the RH-3, indicating Ross-Hicks as contributing designers. The RH-3 proved to be a good performer in soaring contests.

== Variants ==
R-3
Original Ross design, with a NACA 23018 airfoil. None built.
RH-3
Hicks modified Ross design, with a NACA 63 (3)-618 laminar flow airfoil. One built.

== Specifications (RH-3) ==
Data from Sailplane Directory and Soaring

General characteristics

- Crew: one
- Wingspan: 50 ft 0 in (15.24 m)
- Wing area: 146 sq ft (13.6 m^{2})
- Aspect ratio: 17:1
- Airfoil: NACA 63 (3)-618
- Empty weight: 480 lb (218 kg)
- Gross weight: 715 lb (324 kg)

Performance

- Maximum glide ratio: 34:1 at 58 mph
- Rate of sink: 126 ft/min (0.64 m/s) at 40 mph
- Wing loading: 4.9 lb/sq ft (24 kg/m^{2})

== See also ==
- List of gliders
