= Reinhard Cumulus =

West German glider

Cumulus

General information
- Type: Glider
- National origin: West Germany
- Designer: Gerhard Reinhard
- Status: Production completed
- Number built: 10

History
- First flight: 1951

The Reinhard Cumulus is a West German high-wing, strut-braced single-seat, glider that was designed by Gerhard Reinhard for amateur construction.

== Design and development ==
Reinhard developed the Cumulus shortly after the Second World War, first flying it in 1951. The aircraft incorporated many design concepts from prewar aircraft and was similar to the Schneider Grunau Baby and Bowlus Baby Albatross. It has a modest glide ratio of 19:1.

The aircraft is built with a welded steel tube fuselage and wooden-framed wings, all covered in doped aircraft fabric covering. Its 13.57 m (44.5 ft) span wing is supported by a single strut per side. The landing gear was originally a simple skid for both take-off and landing, but later versions incorporated a monowheel instead.

== Specifications (Cumulus) ==
Data from Sailplane Directory, The World's Sailplanes:Die Segelflugzeuge der Welt:Les Planeurs du Monde

General characteristics

- Crew: one
- Length: 6.09 m (20 ft 0 in)
- Wingspan: 13.57 m (44 ft 6 in)
- Wing area: 14.2 m^{2} (153 sq ft)
- Aspect ratio: 13
- Empty weight: 159 kg (351 lb) (equipped)
- Max takeoff weight: 250 kg (551 lb)

Performance

- Never exceed speed: 150 km/h (93 mph, 81 kn)
- Aerotow speed: 90 km/h (55.9 mph; 48.6 kn)
- Winch launch speed: 80 km/h (49.7 mph; 43.2 kn)
- Maximum glide ratio: 19:1 at 63 km/h (39 mph; 34 kn)
- Rate of sink: 0.8 m/s (160 ft/min) at 52 km/h (32 mph; 28 kn)
- Wing loading: 17.62 kg/m^{2} (3.61 lb/sq ft)

== See also ==
Aircraft of comparable role, configuration, and era

- Bowlus Baby Albatross
- Schneider Grunau Baby

Related lists

- List of gliders
