= Ross RS-1 Zanonia =

American glider

RS-1 Zanonia

General information
- Type: Glider
- National origin: United States
- Manufacturer: Harland Ross
- Designer: Harland Ross
- Status: Production completed
- Primary user: John Robinson
- Number built: One

History
- Introduction date: 1937
- First flight: 1937

The Ross RS-1 Zanonia is a single seat, gull-winged glider that was designed and built in 1937 by Harland Ross for actor Harvey Stephens. The design has been highly successful and the aircraft won several competitions, as well as setting many records.

== Design and development ==
Stephens commissioned Ross to build the Zanonia in 1937 and the aircraft was completed in time for Ross to fly it in the 1937 US Nationals. The aircraft was named after the Zanonia macrocarpa tropical flowering plant, the seeds of which are good gliders. The designation indicates Ross-Stephens. The general layout of the glider was inspired by the Lippisch Fafnir II.

The Zanonia is an all-wood design, with a mid-gull wing. Take-off is performed from a dolly and landing is on a fixed skid. Only one was built and it is registered as an amateur-built.

== Operational history ==
The Zanonia made its contest debut with Ross flying it in the 1937 US Nationals, where he placed third, but completed his Silver C badge. The aircraft won second place in the Eaton Design Contest to the Schultz ABC, a competition that was open to any new American glider design that had not been flown at a previous National Championship. The rules required drawings and stress analysis data to be presented with the completed aircraft. The intention was that the winning design would be made available as drawings and kits for amateur construction and that Bureau of Air Commerce design approval would be eventually obtained as well.

Later the aircraft was sold to John Robinson who established the aircraft's reputation, flying it to first place in the 1940, 1941 and 1946 US Nationals. Robinson also placed third in the 1947 nationals and took second place in the 1948 nationals. Robinson also set many records in the Zanonia, including setting a US national distance record of 290 mi (467 km) in 1940 and again in 1947 with a flight of 325 mi (523 km). In 1949 he set a US national altitude record of 33,500 ft (10,211 m). In 1949 Robinson also completed the world's first Diamond badge in the Zanonia.

The aircraft is still registered to private owners in 2011 and is based in Andover, Connecticut. In the spring of 2011 the Zanonia was undergoing a restoration with plans to display it at the 2012 International Vintage Sailplane Meet in Elmira, NY.

== Specifications (RS-1) ==
Data from Soaring

General characteristics

- Crew: one
- Wingspan: 46 ft 0 in (14.02 m)
- Aspect ratio: 17:1
- Airfoil: NACA 2418 root and 2412 tip
- Empty weight: 330 lb (150 kg)
- Gross weight: 600 lb (272 kg)

Performance

- Maximum glide ratio: 29:1 at 48 mph
- Rate of sink: 138 ft/min (0.70 m/s) at 43 mph
- Wing loading: 4.8 lb/sq ft (23 kg/m^{2})

== See also ==
- List of gliders
