= Rubik R-23 Gébics =

Hungarian advanced training glider

R-23 Gébics
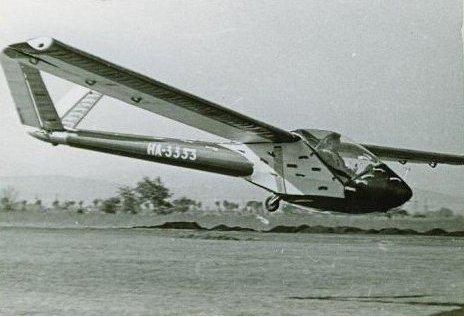

General information
- Type: Training glider
- National origin: Hungary
- Manufacturer: Alagi Központi Kisérleti Üzem (AKKÜ) (Central Experimental Plant, Alag)
- Designer: Ernő Rubik
- Number built: 1

History
- First flight: 13 June 1957

The Rubik R-23 Gébics (Shrike) was a Hungarian advanced training glider, the first of a series of metal-framed gliders designed by Ernő Rubik, though only one Gébics was built.

== Design and development ==
In 1954 the Central Workshop of the Hungarian Aeronautical Association, Dunakeszi (MRSzE) was required to design and build a single seat training glider with pleasant handling characteristics but the performance to take a novice pilot to their C-certificate. The design team was headed by Ernő Rubik. During its design and construction the management of the Dunakeszi workshops changed along with its name, becoming the Alagi Központi Kisérleti Üzem (AKKÜ) (Central Experimental Plant, Alag) in 1955. The R-23 Gébics first flew on 13 June 1957.

Structurally, the Gébics was all-metal, largely built from light-alloy members anodized against corrosion though steel tubes were used in highly stressed parts. The two-part wing was rectangular in plan apart from quadrantal tips and was mounted with 3° of dihedral. Each half-wing was built around a single dural spar at 30% chord, forward of which the wing was dural-covered, with chord-wise corrugations at a pitch of 150 mm (5.91 in), producing a torsion-resistant D-box. Behind the spar the wing was fabric-covered. The Gébics had broad-chord Frise-type ailerons occupying about half the span, their gaps increasing outwards.

The fuselage of the Gébics was a largely dural pod-and-boom structure, though the rear fuselage or boom was quite deep and wide. The central structure was a vertical, trapezoidal, U-section frame, its upper part reinforced with welded steel tubes that included attachment points for the wing spar. From its base a box-keel reached forward to the nose, braced by an arched frame which leaned backwards and joined to the vertical frame under the wing. The Gébics' unusual fan-like airbrakes, sometimes described as bat wing type, were pivoted within the vertical frame and opened into a quadrant from fuselage to the wing underside, with a radius of about 750 mm (30 in). The pilot's seat was mounted on the keel between the vertical and leaning frames under a one-piece, side opening canopy. The underside of the keel carried a landing skid over its full length, with an unsprung, fixed monowheel placed behind the c.g. The boom was a tapering, circular-section, riveted monocoque structure carrying the Gébics' V-tail, which had parallel chord, forward-swept, metal-covered tailplanes set at 90° to each other. The control surfaces were fabric-covered. After development flights, these surfaces were extended in length, their forward sweep removed, separations increased to 108° and the control surfaces givene large aerodynamic balances. Below, there was a small tailskid.

The R-24 Bibic (Lapwing) was identical to the Gébics apart from its wing. This had a 15 m (49 ft 3 in) span to enable it to compete as a Standard Class glider, an area of 12.30 m^{2} (132.4 ft^{2}) and aspect ratio of 18.3. It used the laminar flow NACA 64_{3}618 airfoil, though the wing structure was unchanged. When a government decision closed the AKKU, repurposing its factory, it left the unfinished Bibic abandoned.

The Gébics before modification.

== Operational history ==
After its first flight in June 1957 the Gébics was put through a series of comparative tests with the Cinke (Titmouse), a Hungarian post-war revision of the pre-war DFS Olympia Meise. Below about 90 km/h (56 mph; 49 kn) performances were similar but as speeds rose the superior sinking speed of the Gébics became increasingly significant.

It was then taken to a base in the Mátra mountains chosen for wave lift. Tests showed it to be a stable aircraft with good handling, even in rough air, and difficult to spin. Having demonstrated its suitability for wave lift flights, it stayed in the mountains for a time, investigating techniques for the optimal use of this lift source.

== Variants ==
R-23 Gébics
As described.
R-24 Bibic
As R-23 but Standard Class, with a 15 m (49 ft 3 in) span, laminar flow wing. Not completed.

== Specifications (R-23 Gébics) ==
Data from Gabor, F

General characteristics

- Crew: One
- Length: 7.5 m (24 ft 7 in)
- Wingspan: 13.0 m (42 ft 8 in)
- Wing area: 13.0 m^{2} (140 sq ft)
- Aspect ratio: 13.0
- Airfoil: Modified Göttingen Gö-549
- Empty weight: 168 kg (370 lb)
- Gross weight: 264 kg (582 lb)

Performance

- Maximum speed: 190 km/h (120 mph, 100 kn) with airbrakes open
- Stall speed: 52 km/h (32 mph, 28 kn)
- Maximum glide ratio: 21.1 at 74 km/h (46 mph; 40 kn)
- Rate of sink: 0.85 m/s (167 ft/min) minimum at 65 km/h (40 mph; 35 kn)
