= Rubik R-11b Cimbora =

R-11b Cimbora
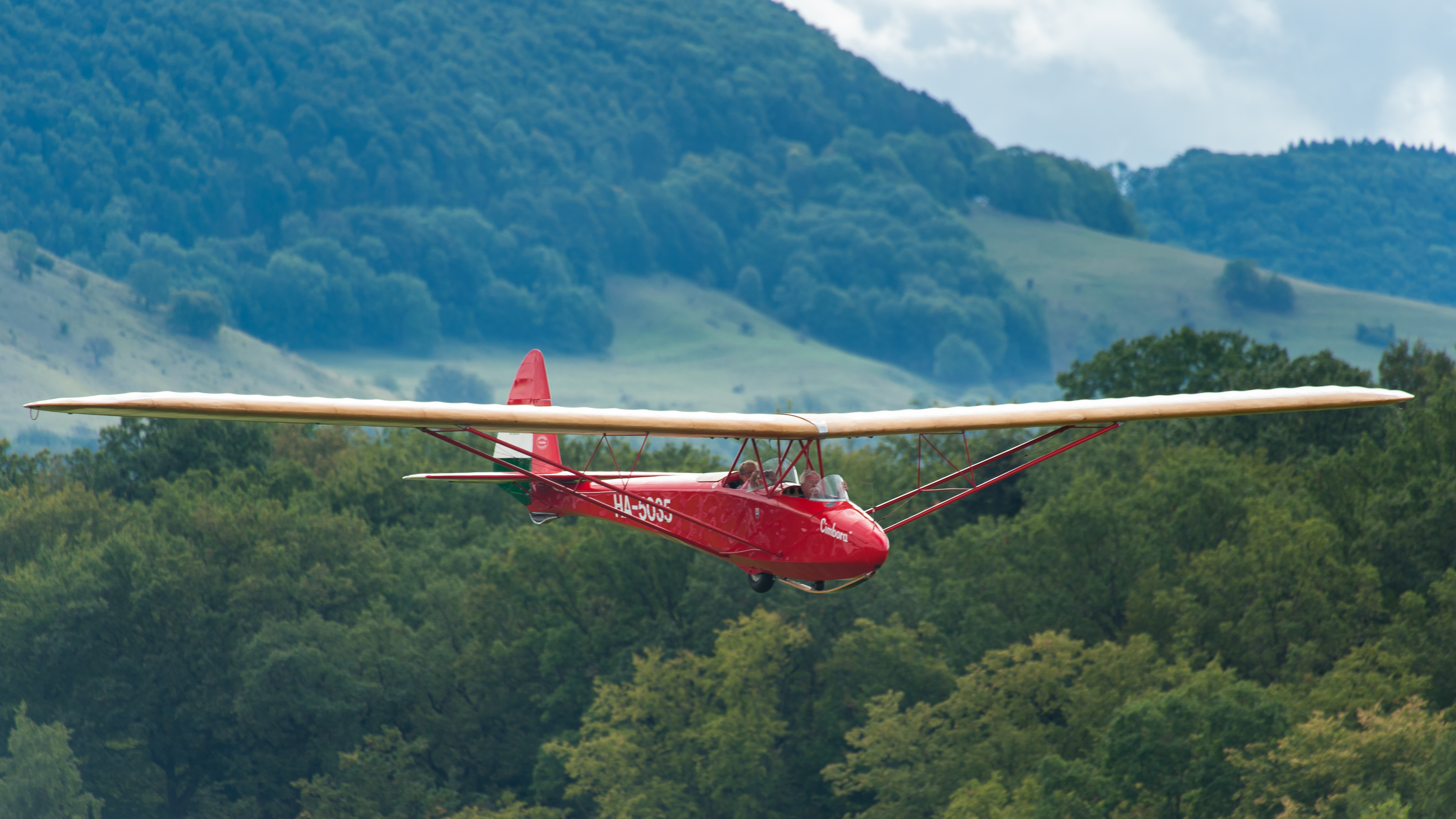

General information
- Type: Advanced trainer sailplane
- National origin: Hungary
- Manufacturer: Aero Ever Kft. Esztergom (50) and the Aircraft Factory of Transylvania in Oradea (12).
- Designer: Ernő Rubik
- Number built: c.62

History
- First flight: 9 May 1940

The Rubik R-11b Cimbora (Pal) was a Hungarian two seat glider, first flown in 1940 and intended to introduce B-certificated pilots to aero-towing techniques. It proved popular and was also used to train pilots in ridge lift flying and set several national duration records.

== Development ==
In 1939 there was a call from the Aeroclub of the fhe Technical University for a two-seat glider on which intermediate level pilots could learn the skills required for aerotowing. Ernő Rubik responded with the F-11 Gólya (Stork) built, like several of his designs, by Aero Ever Kft. Its first flight was on 9 May 1940. A combination of flight test results and tightening regulations lead to three more prototypes, the R-11a, R-11b and R11b_{1}. Details of the differences between them are sparse but it was the R-11b, renamed the Cimbora that went into production in 1941.

== Design ==
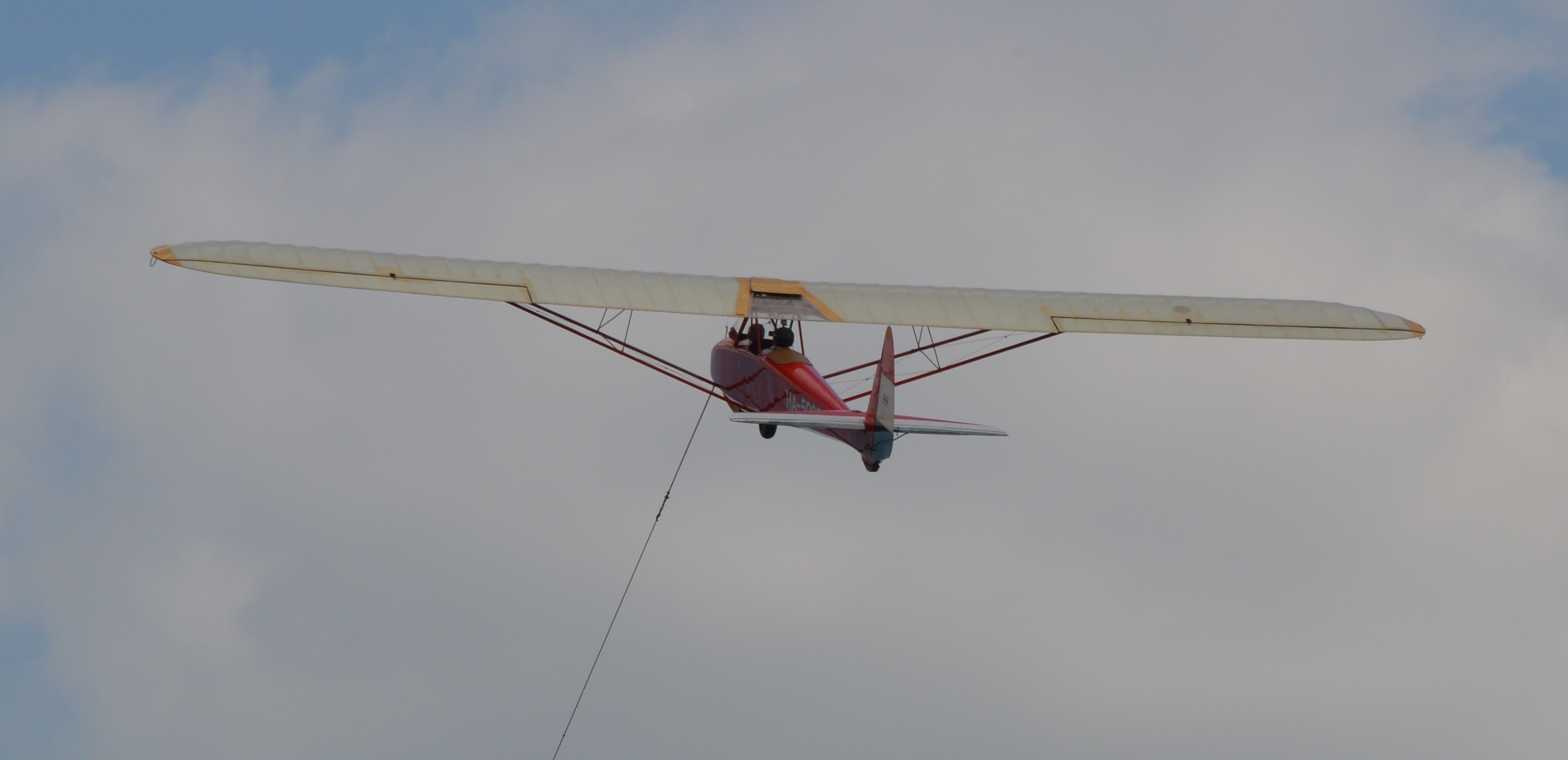
R-11b Cimbora in 2015, winch-launching

The R-11 was a glider with a high, swept, strut-braced wing. The half-wings were built around two spars. Swept at 7.5°, they had constant chord out to rounded tips. Slotted ailerons occupied more than half the span. The wings were supported centrally over the fuselage by a longitudinal pair of inward-leaning steel N-struts from the upper fuselage longerons, joined at their tops and braced outboard by a pair of steel struts on each side from the lower fuselage longerons to the wing spars. On the R-11a Gólya, these were V-struts but the R-11b had instead a near-parallel pair, splaying outwards a little from top to bottom.

Apart from rounded upper decking the ply-covered fuselage was flat-sided, built around longerons and frames. The student's cockpit was under the wing leading edge with a removable cover incorporating a windscreen and the instructor sat under the rear wing in an open cockpit over the centre of gravity (cg) with its own windscreen, accessed via an upwardly hinged upper fuselage section. On the underside a landing skid ran from the nose to below the front of the instructor's cockpit. Aft of it, but ahead of the cg. there was a semi-exposed monowheel. The fuselage tapered rearwards to the tail, where the R-11's strut-braced tailplane was placed on top of the fuselage just ahead of a small, tapered fin. The tailplane and elevators together were tapered in plan out to rounded tips. The full, rounded, balanced rudder reached down to the keel, behind a small tailskid.

== Operational history ==
As well as providing aerotowing training, the Cimbora was used to train pilots in ridge-flying techniques, a style which encouraged duration record attempts. The longest in Hungary lasted 25 hr 7 min, flown by Géza Vass and Endre Lacza in August 1948. R-11bs remained in use into the 1950s. A 1984 replica, HA-5035, based at Budaörs Airport, remained active at least to 2016 but is currently deregistered.

== Specifications ==
Data from Gabor, F

General characteristics

- Crew: Two, student and instructor
- Length: 7.52 m (24 ft 8 in)
- Wingspan: 15 m (49 ft 3 in)
- Wing area: 21.5 m^{2} (231 sq ft)
- Aspect ratio: 10.5
- Airfoil: Göttingen Gö 549
- Empty weight: 220 kg (485 lb)
- Gross weight: 400 kg (882 lb)

Performance

- Maximum speed: 100 km/h (62 mph, 54 kn) VNE
- Maximum glide ratio: 14
- Rate of sink: 1.1 m/s (220 ft/min) minimum
