= OMRE OE-01 =

OE-1

General information
- Type: Glider
- National origin: Hungary
- Manufacturer: MRSz Központi Repülögépjavító Üzem, Dunakeszi (Central Aircraft Repair Plant of the MRSz, Dunakeszi)
- Number built: 1

History
- First flight: 14 May 1951

The OMRE OE-1 (a.k.a. Rubik R-20) was an experimental high performance sailplane designed and built in Hungary during 1950–1951.

== Design and development ==
During design work for the Rubik R-22 Június-18 and the need for a high performance glider for competition and record breaking was realised. Requirements included a minimum sinking speed of only slightly over 0,5 m/s, a best glide ratio of 32 to 35 with a low curvature polar curve to give good performance at higher speeds.

The wing design evolved into a high aspect ratio of 23:1, a modest wing loading of 20 kg/m^{2} and light alloy stressed skin structure, giving a smooth surface and the prospect of laminar flow.

Initial design work was carried out at OMRE – Országos Magyar Repülö Egyesület (National Hungarian Flying Association) but this organisation was taken over by MRSz (Hungarian Aeronautical Association) during 1951, resulting in the loss of experienced designers and constructors. The Dunakeszi workshops of the MRSz were not capable of producing the light alloy structure of the OE-1, as designed, so an all wooden wing was built using traditional methods.

The OE-1 was a cantilever mid-wing monoplane built entirely of wood with plywood skinning on structural parts and aircraft fabric covering on control surfaces. Features included a fixed main-wheel, V-tail and tail parachute for approach control.

Flight tests of the OE-1 began on 14 May 1951, demonstrating good performance at moderate speeds and good handling characteristics. The design goal of good performance at high speeds was not realised due to the poor surface finish and deformation of the wings under load at high speed. Laminar flow was not achieved which resulted in much higher drag, particularly at high speeds. During the take over the more design staff were dispersed and not available to continue development of the OE-1.

Despite good handling qualities the OE-1 was not liked by pilots due to the unusually high flexibility of the wing and its mid set position which resulted in the wing tips being close to the ground. The OE-1 was also not certified for aerobatics, spin and cloud flying which limited its usefulness and appeal. The sole OE-1 was scrapped in the late 1950s.

The cantilever, mid set, wooden wing of the OE-1 consisted of three parts: the 9 m (30 ft) span 90 cm (3.0 ft) chord rectangular planform centre section and two tapered outer panels 4.5 m (14.8 ft) span and rounded wing-tips. Three position plain flaps were fitted to the trailing edges of the centre section with a chord of 24 cm (9 in) and set positions of −0.5, +8 and +80 degrees. Ailerons occupied the entire trailing edges of the outer panels. A shallow gull form was due to reduced dihedral on the outer panels.

The airfoil section chosen was derived from the NACA 23012 by Márton Pap, with the thickness of the section modified to achieve the desired pressure distribution. Maximum thickness was moved back to 45% chord to achieve laminar flow, checked in the wind tunnel of the Technical University of Budapest.

The fuselage of the OE-1 was designed with minimal cross sectional area, transitioning from circular at the nose to ovoid at the cockpit back to circular for the tapered tail-boom. The pilots seat was located at the bottom skin and control rods routed through channels either side of the cockpit.

The landing gear comprised a main-wheel aft of the centre of gravity with nose and tail-skids sprung with rubber. A spring-loaded 1.1 m (3.6 ft) diameter parachute was fitted in the tail cone which could be deployed and retracted by the pilot as required.

V-tail surfaces were carried at the end of the tail-boom at an angle of 114° to each other with push rods operating the large horn balanced ruddervators for yaw control as well as pitch.

== Specifications (OMRE OE-1) ==
Data from The World's Sailplanes:Die Segelflugzeuge der Welt:Les Planeurs du Monde

General characteristics

- Crew: 1
- Length: 7.25 m (23 ft 9 in)
- Wingspan: 18 m (59 ft 1 in)
- Wing area: 13.95 m^{2} (150.2 sq ft)
- Aspect ratio: 23.3
- Empty weight: 215 kg (474 lb) equipped
- Max takeoff weight: 315 kg (694 lb)

Performance

- Stall speed: 62 km/h (39 mph, 33 kn)
- Never exceed speed: 220 km/h (140 mph, 120 kn)
- Aerotow speed: 125 km/h (67.5 kn; 77.7 mph)
- Winch launch speed: 100 km/h (54.0 kn; 62.1 mph)
- g limits: +4
- Maximum glide ratio: 32.3 at 80 km/h (43.2 kn; 49.7 mph)
- Rate of sink: 0.65 m/s (128 ft/min) at 75 km/h (40.5 kn; 46.6 mph)
- Wing loading: 22.5 kg/m^{2} (4.6 lb/sq ft)
