= Rensselaer RP-2 =

American glider

RP-2

General information
- Type: Glider
- National origin: United States
- Manufacturer: Rensselaer Polytechnic Institute
- Designer: Steven J. Winckler
- Status: Production completed
- Number built: 1

History
- First flight: 1985

The Rensselaer RP-2 (for Rensselaer Polytechnic design 2) is an American mid-wing, single-seat glider that was designed by Steven J. Winckler and produced by the Rensselaer Polytechnic Institute of Troy, New York.

== Design and development ==
The RP-2 was the second aircraft in Rensselaer's Composite Aircraft Program and first flew in 1985.

The aircraft is of mixed construction, made from carbon-fiber-reinforced polymer, Kevlar and fiberglass. Its 44.25 ft (13.5 m) span wing employs a Boeing 80-163 airfoil and features split flaps. The aircraft weighs just 273 lb (124 kg) empty. The landing gear consists of a conventional glider-style monowheel. The aircraft achieved a 29:1 glide ratio.

== Operational history ==
Initially registered with the Federal Aviation Administration in the Experimental - Amateur-built category, by August 2011 the sole RP-2 built had been removed from the registry.

== Specifications (RP-2) ==
Data from Sailplane Directory

General characteristics

- Crew: one
- Wingspan: 44 ft 3 in (13.49 m)
- Wing area: 120 sq ft (11 m^{2})
- Aspect ratio: 16.4:1
- Airfoil: Boeing 80-163
- Empty weight: 273 lb (124 kg)
- Gross weight: 437 lb (198 kg)

Performance

- Maximum glide ratio: 29:1 at 45 mph (72 km/h)
- Rate of sink: 136 ft/min (0.69 m/s)
- Wing loading: 3.64 lb/sq ft (17.8 kg/m^{2})

== See also ==
Related lists

- List of gliders
