= Germania C.IV =

WWI German reconnaissance biplane

General information
- Type: Reconnaissance aircraft
- Manufacturer: Germania Flugzeugwerke
- Status: prototype only
- Primary user: Luftstreitkräfte
- Number built: 1

History
- First flight: 1918

The Germania C.IV was a two-seat general-purpose biplane built by Germania Flugzeugwerke during World War I.

== Design and development ==
The C.IV was built as a small spotter reconnaissance aircraft wooden construction with fabric covering. No armament was installed on the aircraft. The Luftsreitkräfte did not accept the aircraft and the C.IV was converted into a trainer with dual control, eventually being transferred to a flight school.

== Specifications ==
Data from

General characteristics

- Crew: 2
- Length: 7.10 m (23 ft 4 in)
- Wingspan: 11.40 m (37 ft 5 in)
- Powerplant: 1 × Argus As.III , 89 kW (120 hp)

Performance

- Maximum speed: 140 km/h (87 mph, 76 kn)
- Cruise speed: 120 km/h (75 mph, 65 kn)

== See also ==
Related development

- Albatros B.II
- Albatros C.III

Aircraft of comparable role, configuration, and era

- Royal Aircraft Factory B.E.2
- LVG C.II
- Rumpler C.I

Related lists

- List of military aircraft of Germany

== Bibliography ==
- Angelucci, Enzo. The Rand McNally Encyclopedia of Military Aircraft, 1914-1980. San Diego, California: The Military Press, 1983. ISBN 0-517-41021-4.
- Cowin, H.W. German and Austrian Aviation of World War I. Oxford, UK: Osprey Publishing Ltd, 2000. ISBN 1-84176-069-2.
- Gray, Peter and Owen Thetford. German aircraft of the First World War. London: Putnam, 1970, 2nd edition. ISBN 0-370-00103-6.
- van Wyngarden, G. Early German Aces of World War I. Oxford, UK: Osprey Publishing Ltd, 2006. ISBN 1-84176-997-5
