= Sablatnig N.I =

Type of aircraft

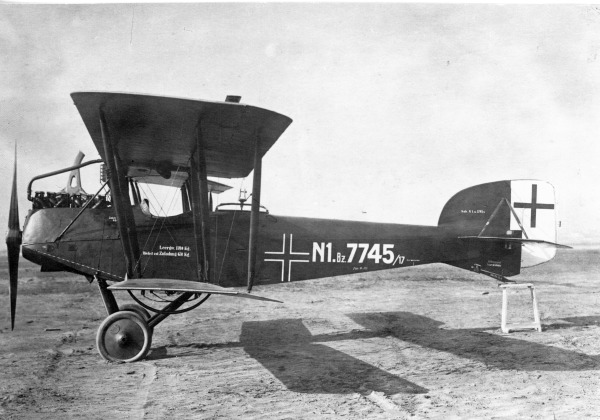

General information
- Type: Bomber aircraft
- National origin: Germany
- Manufacturer: Sablatnig
- Number built: 8

History
- First flight: 1918
- Developed from: Sablatnig C.I

The Sablatnig N.I was a bomber aircraft developed in Germany during the First World War, a development of the Sablatnig C.I adapted for night operations.

== Development ==
The N.1 was a two-bay biplane of conventional design, with staggered wings, two open cockpits in tandem, and fixed, tailskid undercarriage. At least eight aircraft were built during the war and converted to P.I standard after the Armistice.

After the Armistice Sablatnig developed the P.I. Adding a cabin for four passengers, the P.I was one of the few aircraft approved by the ILÜK (Interallierte Luftfahrt-Überwachungs-Kommission, Inter-allied Aviation Control Commission) for production in Germany.

== Variants ==
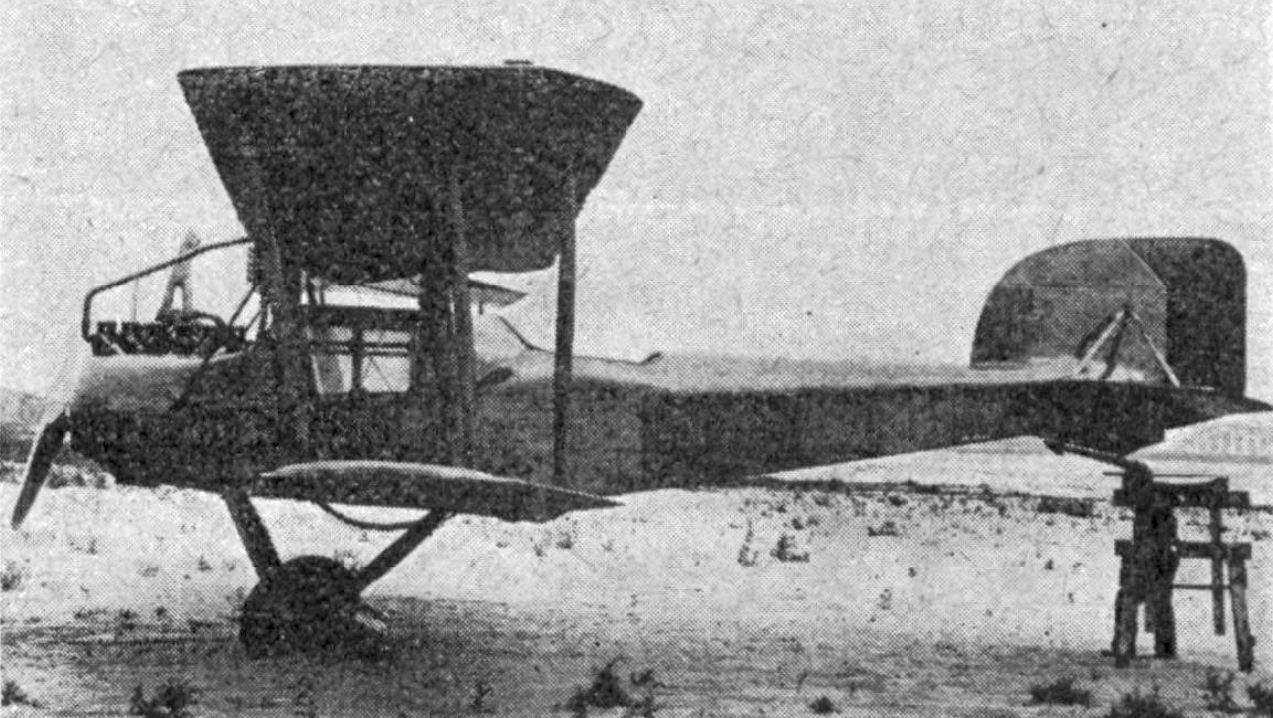
Sablatnig P.I photo from L'Aerophile January, 1921

N.I
Two-seat night-bomber / attack aircraft with limited production, (at least eight).
P.I
A four-seat, plus pilot, airliner produced by direct conversion of eight N.I airframes with at least seven more aircraft built as P.Is

== Operational history ==
Despite limited, if any, use by the Imperial German Army Air service, those N.Is that were built were converted to civilian standards as P.Is and operated chiefly by Danish Air Express and Lloyd Luftverkehr Sablatnig.

== Specifications (N.I) ==
Data from Die Deutschen Militärflugzeuge 1910–1918, German Aircraft of the First World War, Deutsche Flugzeuge, 1914-1918

General characteristics

- Crew: 2
- Length: 8.7 m (28 ft 7 in)
- Wingspan: 16 m (52 ft 6 in)
- Height: 3.2 m (10 ft 6 in)
- Empty weight: 1,190 kg (2,624 lb)
- Gross weight: 1,860 kg (4,101 lb)
- Powerplant: 1 × Argus As III 6-cylinder water-cooled in-line piston engine, 130 kW (180 hp)

Performance

- Maximum speed: 125 km/h (78 mph, 67 kn)
- Time to altitude: 1,000 m (3,300 ft) in 10 minutes, 4,000 m (13,000 ft) in 59 minutes

Armament

- 1 × fixed, forward-firing 7.9 mm (0.311 in) Parabellum MG14
- 1 × flexible 7.92 mm (0.312 in) LMG 08/15 in rear cockpit
- 300 kg (660 lb) of bombs

== Bibliography ==
- Herris, Jack (2012). Nachtflugzeug: German N-Types of WWI. Great War Aviation Centennial Series. Vol. 3. n. p.: Aeronaut Books. ISBN 978-1-935881-10-0.
