= Rumpler C.X =

German First World War observationaircraft

C.X
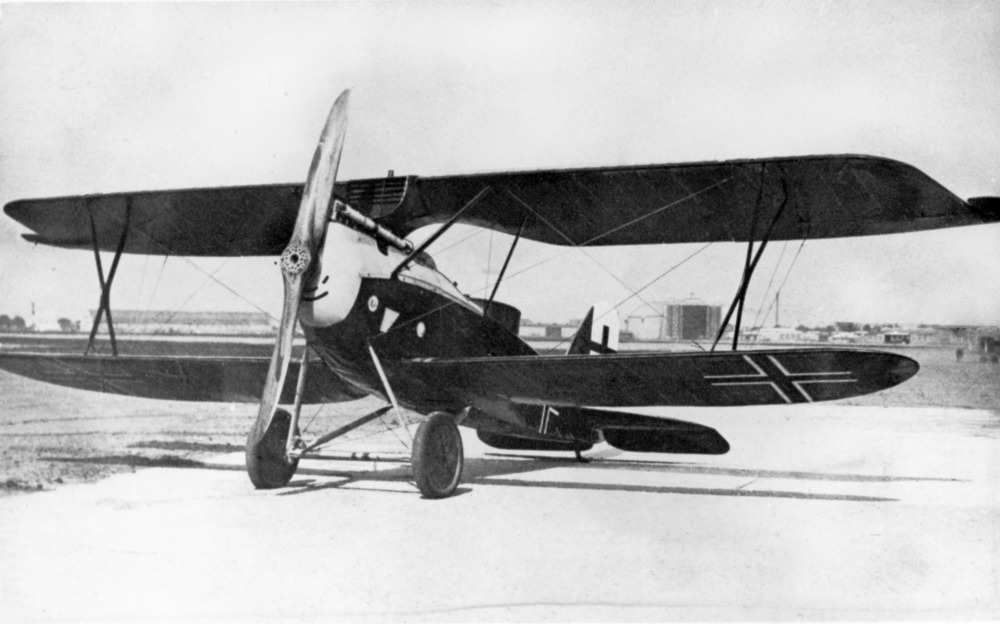

General information
- Type: Observation aircraft
- National origin: German
- Manufacturer: Rumpler
- Number built: 1

History
- First flight: 1918

The Rumpler C.X, produced under the company designation Rumpler 8C 14, was a German two-seat observation aircraft. It was developed from the earlier Rumpler 8C 13 prototype by Rumpler in early 1918. The prototype had a similar wing design to the Rumpler C.VII, powered by a 260 hp (194 kW) Mercedes D.IVa engine and was later powered by a 240 hp (179 kW) Maybach Mb.IVa. The C.X had the highest top speed and service ceiling of all German C-type aircraft and an order was placed for the aircraft in August 1918, but few were built and tested before the war ended.

== Specifications ==
Data from Over the Front, Volume 23

General characteristics

- Crew: two
- Length: 6.9 m (22 ft 8 in)
- Wingspan: 10.5 m (34 ft 5 in)
- Height: 3.12 m (10 ft 3 in)
- Wing area: 29 m^{2} (310 sq ft)
- Empty weight: 950 kg (2,094 lb)
- Gross weight: 1,385 kg (3,053 lb)
- Powerplant: 1 × Maybach Mb.IV 6-cyl. water-cooled in-line piston engine, 180 kW (240 hp)

Performance

- Maximum speed: 195 km/h (121 mph, 105 kn)
- Endurance: 3⅓ hours
- Service ceiling: 7,800 m (25,600 ft)
- Rate of climb: 3.07 m/s (604 ft/min)
- Time to altitude: 6,000 m (20,000 ft) in 27 minutes, 7,800 m (25,600 ft) in 59 minutes

Armament

- Guns: 1 × fixed LMG 08/15 Spandau machine gun, 1 × manually aimed Parabellum MG 14/17 machine gun on a flexible mount in the rear cockpit.
