= Rumpler C.VII =

German reconnaissance aircraft in WWI

C.VII
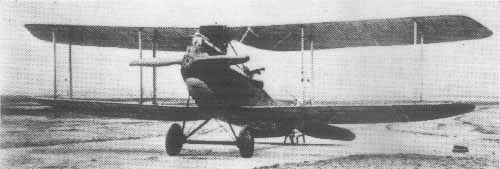
- Rumpler C.VII (c. 1917)

General information
- Type: Reconnaissance aircraft
- National origin: Germany
- Manufacturer: Rumpler

History
- First flight: 1917

The Rumpler C.VII was a military reconnaissance aircraft built in Germany during World War I. It was developed from the C.IV and optimised for high-altitude missions that would allow it to operate at heights that would render it immune to interception by enemy fighters. Work on the C.VII took place after a similar attempt to develop the C.III into a high-altitude machine as the C.V failed.

== Design and development ==
The most significant difference between the C.IV and C.VII was the choice of the Maybach Mb IVa engine to replace the Mercedes D.IV. Although the Maybach engine was around 8% less powerful than the Mercedes (when measured at the sea level), it could continue to provide most of its power output while at altitude, where power from the Mercedes engine decreased more rapidly as height increased. Other changes included wings of slightly greater area and an airscrew of larger diameter. The crew were provided with oxygen generators and electrically heated flight suits.

Rumpler produced the C.VII in two versions: a standard radio-equipped reconnaissance machine, and a photographic version named the Rubild (or Rubilt) a contraction of Rumpler Bildaufklärer (photo reconnaissance).

== Operational history ==
The two versions of the Rumpler C.VII were in service simultaneously. The standard C.VII was used for armed long-distance reconnaissance. The armament was one fixed, synchronized LMG 08/15 Spandau machine gun firing forward, and one manually operated 7.92 mm (.312 in) Parabellum MG14 machine gun at the observer/gunner's rear position (the observer also operated a radio). The Rubild was a "stripped-down" version that dispensed with the forward gun and eliminated all other extraneous equipment in order to carry specialized cameras.

The Rubild was capable of operating as high as 7,300 m (24,000 ft), and could maintain 160 km/h (100 mph) at 6,100 m (20,000 ft). The high-altitude version proved practically invulnerable to interception above 5,500 m (18,000 ft). Allied combat reports most often featured the high-flying Rubild. The type was particularly difficult to intercept, as the Allied fighters were seldom able even to climb to such altitude. According to noted ace James McCudden, "It was an exception to the rule to see an [ S.E.5 ] above 17,000 feet." One of the few Allied fighters able to reach such altitudes, and hence capable of intercepting the Rubild, was the Sopwith Dolphin.

At the end of the war, at least one Rumpler C.VII was captured and sent to the United States.

== Operators ==
German Empire

- Luftstreitkräfte

Switzerland

- Swiss Air Force

United States

- United States Air Force

Kingdom of Yugoslavia

- Yugoslav Royal Air Force - Postwar.

== Specifications (Rubild) ==
Data from Kroschel and Stützer 1994, p. 147.

General characteristics

- Crew: Two, pilot and observer
- Length: 8.20 m (26 ft 11 in)
- Wingspan: 12.65 m (41 ft 6 in)
- Height: 3.20 m (10 ft 6 in)
- Wing area: 34.8 m^{2} (374 sq ft)
- Empty weight: 1,050 kg (2,310 lb)
- Gross weight: 1,485 kg (3,267 lb)
- Powerplant: 1 × Maybach Mb.IVa , 180 kW (245 hp)

Performance

- Maximum speed: 175 km/h (110 mph, 96 kn)
- Range: 585 km (365 mi, 317 nmi)
- Service ceiling: 7,300 m (24,000 ft)

Armament

- 1 × trainable, rearward-firing 7.92 mm (.312 in) machine gun
