= Rumpler 6B =

1916 German reconnaissance floatplane

6B
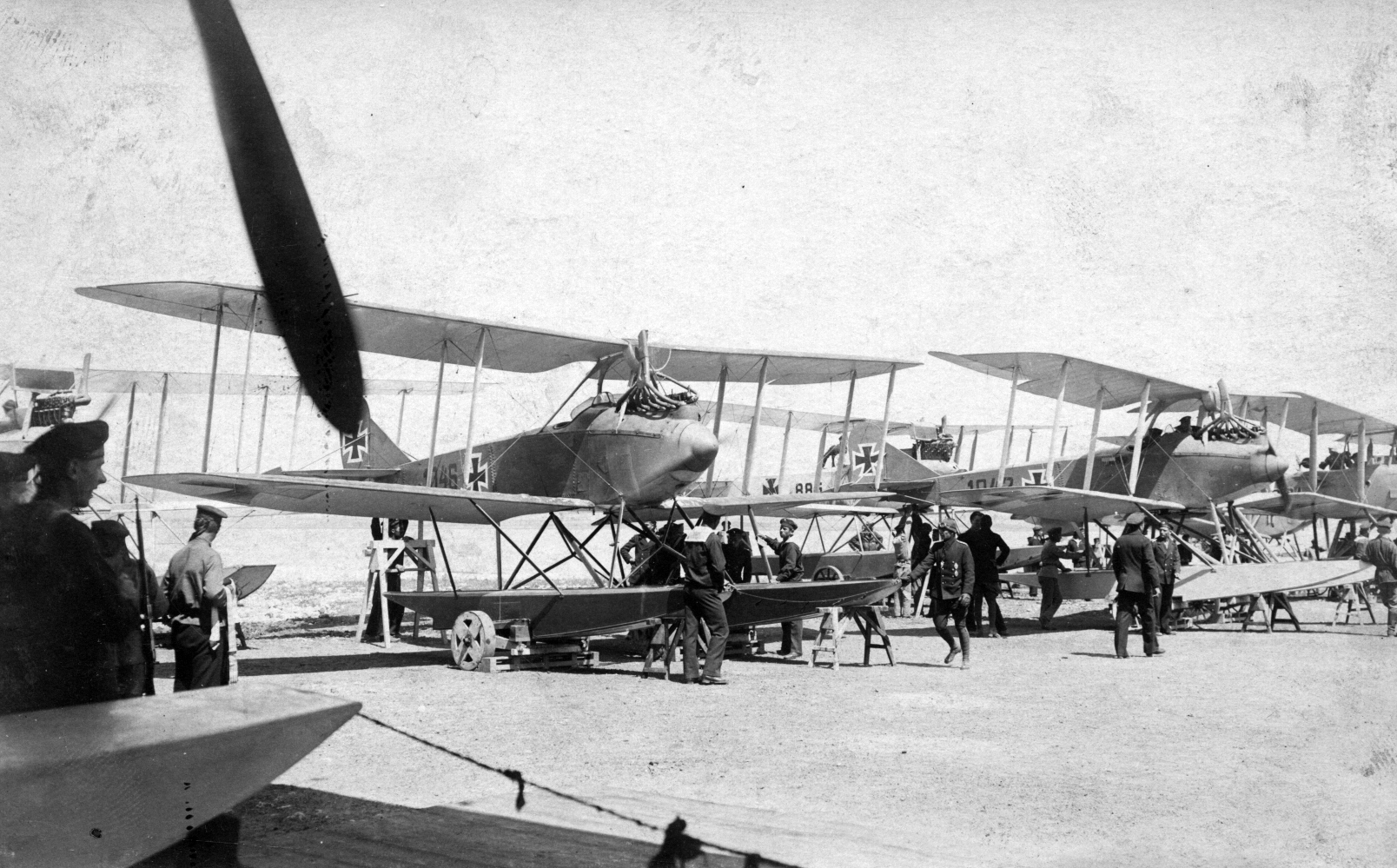
- Rumpler 6B1

General information
- Type: Floatplane fighter
- Manufacturer: Rumpler Flugzeugwerke
- Primary user: German Imperial Navy
- Number built: 88

History
- Manufactured: 1916–1918
- Introduction date: 1916
- First flight: 1916
- Retired: 1926
- Developed from: Rumpler C.I and Rumpler C.IV

The Rumpler 6B was a German floatplane fighter designed during World War I by Rumpler Flugzeugwerke for the Imperial German Navy's (Kaiserliche Marine) Naval Air Service (Marine-Fliegerabteilung). The 6B1 was a single-seat version of the Rumpler C.I reconnaissance biplane that entered service in mid-1916. The 6B2 was an improved version based on the Rumpler C.IV; deliveries of the 6B2 began in mid-1917. Small numbers of aircraft were exported to the Austro-Hungarian Empire, the Kingdom of Bulgaria, and Finland; one of the Finnish aircraft participated in the Finnish Civil War. The 6B1s were reasonably successful in combat, able to hold its own against enemy land-based aircraft, but they lacked the advantages offered by the new two-seat floatplane fighters entering service when the 6B2 became available. Most surviving 6Bs became training aircraft during the war. Most of the Rumplers in service with the Central Powers were probably scrapped after the end of the war in November 1918.

After the war, the Kingdom of Serbs, Croats, and Slovenes inherited two of the 6Bs purchased by Austro-Hungarian Empire while the Netherlands used one aircraft that it had interned in 1917. The Finns purchased one additional 6B in 1918. These aircraft were generally used for training until they were scrapped during the mid-1920s.

== Design and development ==
Born out of a requirement of the Imperial Navy for a seaplane fighter to defend its air bases issued in May 1916, the Rumpler 6B was, like its contemporaries the Albatros W.4 and Hansa-Brandenburg KDW, an adaptation of an existing landplane design. Unlike its competitors derived from single-seat fighters, Rumpler's new aircraft was based on the company's two-seat C.I reconnaissance aircraft. The 6B1 retained the C.I's robust wooden and fabric fuselage with a steel-tube framework reinforcing the forward fuselage, although the observer's cockpit was faired over. The installation of the water-cooled 160 hp (120 kW) Mercedes D.III engine remained the same with the semi-circular radiator mounted to the underside of the upper wing and the "chimney" exhaust pipe protruding above the level of the upper wing. In an effort to reduce aerodynamic drag the propeller was fitted with a spinner. The two-bay wings were unaltered although their stagger was revised with the upper wing moved forward to compensate for the removal of the observer's position and armament and the additional weight of the two floats. These were connected to the fuselage by steel-tube V-struts. A larger rudder was fitted to offset the increased side area caused by the addition of floats. In the production aircraft, the area of the horizontal stabilizers was slightly reduced. The armament consisted of a fixed, forward-firing 7.92 mm (.312 in) LMG 08/15 "Spandau" machine gun, although at least four 6B1s were armed with two machine guns.

A new version of the basic design, the 6B2, was introduced in July 1917. These aircraft retained the D.III engine, but were otherwise based on the Rumpler C.IV. This improved version of the C.I had had its spinner removed and its nose recontoured into a blunter shape after flight testing had shown that the spinner and tapered nose of the C.I caused more drag. The change improved the speed of the 6B2 by 14 km/h (8.7 mph) over the 6B1. The 6B2 was designed to use two machine guns, but only about half of them were equipped with both weapons.

== Operational history ==
The three 6B1 prototypes were delivered in July–August 1916 for evaluation. The first batch of 10 production aircraft were delivered between November 1916 and February 1917. A second batch of 25 6B1s were received between February and May, although one last aircraft was delivered in January 1918. The prototype 6B2 was tested beginning in January 1917 with 50 production models delivered to the Naval Air Service between July 1917 and January 1918.

The Rumpler 6Bs were mostly employed at German seaplane bases at Ostend and Zeebrugge. One of the 6B1 prototypes was sent to Zeebrugge in late August; it shot down a British Short floatplane on 31 August. The fighter intercepted and shot down a twin-engined British Caudron G.4 bomber returning from a bombing mission on Sint-Denijs-Westrem Airfield in Occupied Belgium on 7 September. It intercepted a French FBA Type H flying boat on a reconnaissance mission on 23 October. The flying boat was forced to make an emergency landing and the crew was captured. Production 6B1s began deliveries in December to Zeebrugge.

Flugmeister Karl Meyer damaged a Sopwith Pup fighter of the Royal Naval Air Service on 1 February 1917 and forced it to make an emergency landing on the beach near Bredene, Occupied Belgium. Meyer taxiied up to the beach and took the pilot captive. An inventory taken on 12 February showed the three prototype 6B1s and five production models assigned to Zeebrugge, one of which was armed with two machine guns. A 6B1 was destroyed in a landing accident in Zeebrugge harbor on 1 March; the pilot survived. Four 6B1s from Ostende covered the unsuccessful search for two missing torpedo boats on 21 March. The searchers spotted the British blimp C-17 on patrol near Nieuwpoort, Belgium, and radioed a spot report back to Zeebrugge where Meyer and another pilot took off to intercept it. They were successful and shot down the blimp, killing its crew. Two more 6B1s equipped with two machine guns were delivered in May. A 6B1 was used to rescue a wounded French pilot from his shot-down FBA H-4 on 24 May. The following morning, three 6B1s from Ostende escorted 23 Gotha G.IV heavy bombers as they returned from bombing England. On 13 June, all of the single-seat float fighters were assigned to the newly formed single-seat squadron (Einsitzer-Staffel). The squadron was very active in June and July despite the bad weather. Missions included an unsuccessful search for survivors of the torpedo boat SMS G 96 that had struck a naval mine and sunk on 26 June and escorting bombers on their return trip from England on 4 July. Despite deliveries of three more 6B1s and fifteen 6B2s armed with two machine guns between July and November, the Zeebrugge war diary does not record any further activity of the single-seat squadron or 6Bs after July. The fighters were probably relegated to training duties for the rest of the war as the Naval Air Service had come to prefer the two-seat floatplane fighters like the Hansa-Brandenburg W.12 by this time because the extra crewman could assist the pilot with over-water navigation and operate a wireless transmitter, things that the single-seat aircraft like the 6B could not do.

Two 6B1s were assigned to the German-Turkish Naval Flying Unit (Wasserfliegerabteilung) in 1917. One pilot from this unit claimed to have shot down two aircraft that same year. When the Allies inspected the German seaplane bases in December 1918, they recorded six surviving 6B1s and twenty-four 6B2s. One of these aircraft, probably a 6B2, was turned over by the Allies to the Empire of Japan as part of the war reparations. Their ultimate fate is unknown, but they were likely scrapped.

=== Austro-Hungarian Empire ===
Four 6B2s were sold to the Imperial and Royal Navy (Kaiserlich und königlich Kriegsmarine) in mid-1918 and were mostly used for maritime reconnaissance. Two of these were based at Kumbor, Montenegro, at the end of the war and were seized by the newly formed Kingdom of Serbs, Croats and Slovenes, which later became the Kingdom of Yugoslavia.

=== Bulgaria ===
The two 6B1s that were stationed at the German Naval Air Station Peynerdjik near Varna, Bulgaria, were transferred in April 1918 to the Bulgarian Navy. The fighters were seized by the French occupation forces after the end of the war. They were destroyed in accordance with the clauses of the Treaty of Neuilly-sur-Seine in October 1920.

=== Finland ===
During the Finnish Civil War, the anti-communist White Army ordered one 6B1 and seven other aircraft from Germany in February 1918. The first of this batch of aircraft was received by the end of March; the 6B1 was delivered to Flying Detachment I (Valkoisten Lento-psasto I) at the end of April. The fighter was based in Helsinki in mid-1918 and was then transferred to the 1st Field Flying Detachmenton on 5 October. It was destroyed in a crash at the Beryozovye Islands on 24 October 1919, although the pilot was only slightly injured.

A 6B2 was bought from the Germans in Tallinn on 26 November 1918, but it was little used. It had only accumulated 35 flight hours when it made its last flight on 26 October 1926 as it spent a lot of time under repair between assignments to the Aviation School or Air Force Headquarters. The aircraft was struck off charge on 27 September 1927.

=== The Netherlands ===
A 6B2 was interned in 1917 and later served with the Netherlands Naval Aviation Service (Dutch: Marineluchtvaartdienst) with the serial number U1. Its fate is unknown.

=== Yugoslavia ===
Two of the 6B2s sold to the Imperial and Royal Navy by the Germans were briefly controlled by the forces of the nascent Royal Yugoslav Naval Aviation at the end of the war, but they were seized by French troops when they occupied Kumbor in December 1918. The fighters were turned over to the Yugoslavs when the occupation ended in March 1921. As the Navy had no interest in operating fighters, the aircraft were soon disarmed and used for training. On 2 September 1922, a 6B2 was one of six seaplanes to fly from Kumbor to Split, Croatia, where the aircraft's pilot, Lieutenant Commander Glauko Prebanda, performed an aerobatics display. His 6B2 had engine problems on the flight home and Prebanda did not return to Kumbor until 5 September. At least one 6B2 remained in service until April 1926 and was retired shortly afterwards.

== Survivors ==
The Hallinportti Aviation Museum has a partially restored Rumpler 6B2 on display.

== Operators ==
Austro-Hungarian Empire

- Austro-Hungarian Navy

Bulgaria

- Bulgarian Navy

Finland

- Finnish Air Force

German Empire

- Imperial German Navy

Netherlands

- Royal Netherlands Navy

Kingdom of Yugoslavia

- Royal Yugoslav Navy

== Specifications (6B1) ==

Data from The Complete Book of Fighters: An Illustrated Encyclopedia of Every Fighter Built and Flown; Die deutschen Militärflugzeuge 1910–1918; Rumpler Aircraft of WWI: A Centennial Perspective on Great War Airplanes

General characteristics

- Crew: 1
- Length: 9.05 m (29 ft 8 in)
- Wingspan: 12.15 m (39 ft 10 in)
- Height: 3.5 m (11 ft 6 in)
- Wing area: 35.7 m^{2} (384 sq ft)
- Empty weight: 790 kg (1,742 lb)
- Max takeoff weight: 1,140 kg (2,513 lb)
- Powerplant: 1 × Mercedes D.III water-cooled, straight-six engine, 120 kW (160 hp)
- Propellers: 2-bladed fixed-pitch propeller

Performance

- Maximum speed: 153 km/h (95 mph, 83 kn)
- Combat range: 550 km (340 mi, 300 nmi)
- Time to altitude: 25 minutes to 3,000 m (9,800 ft)

Armament

- Guns: 1 or 2 × fixed, forward-firing 7.92 mm (.312 in) LMG 08/15

== See also ==
Related lists

- List of fighter aircraft
- List of military aircraft of Finland
- List of military aircraft of Germany

== Bibliography ==
- Andersson, Lennart & Sanger, Ray (2014). Retribution and Recovery: German Aircraft and Aviation 1919 to 1922. Staplefield, UK: Air-Britain (Historians). ISBN 978-0-85130-467-0.
- Ciglic, Boris (2014). Seaplanes of Bocche: The Story of Austro-Hungarian Naval Aviation in Southern Adriatic 1913–1918. Belgrade: Jeroplan Books. ISBN 978-86-909727-1-5.
- Ciglic, Boris & Raguz, Mario (2023). Adriatic Guard: The Story of the Naval Aviation of the Kingdom of Serbs, Croats and Slovenes 1918–1929. Belgrade: Jeroplan Books. ISBN 978-86-909727-7-7.
- Green, William & Swanborough, Gordon (2001) [1994]. The Complete Book of Fighters: An Illustrated Encyclopedia of Every Fighter Built and Flown (Revised and Updated ed.). London: Salamander Books. ISBN 1-84065-269-1.
- Herris, Jack (2012). German Seaplane Fighters of WWI: A Centennial Perspective on Great War Seaplanes. Great War Aviation Centennial Series. Vol. 2. n. p.: Aeronaut Books. ISBN 978-1-935881-09-4.
- Herris, Jack (2014). Rumpler Aircraft of WWI: A Centennial Perspective on Great War Airplanes. Great War Aviation Centennial Series. Vol. 11. n.p.: Aeronaut Books. ISBN 978-1-935881-21-6.
- Keskinen, Kalevi; Partonen, Kyösti & Stenman, Kari (2005). Suomen ilmavoimat 1918-1927 [Finnish Air Force 1918–1927] (in Finnish and English). Helsinki: Kustannusliike Kari Stenman. ISBN 952-99432-2-9.
- Kroschel, Günter & Stützer, Helmut (1977). Die deutschen Militärflugzeuge 1910-1918 : In 127 Vierseitenrissen Im Massstab 1:144 [German Military Aircraft 1910–1918 in 127 1:144 Scale Drawings] (in German). Wilhelmshaven: Lohse-Eissing. ISBN 3-92060-218-8.
- Lamberton, W. M. (1960). Fighter Aircraft of the 1914–1918 War. Letchworth, UK: Harleyford Publications. OCLC 1395838.
- Nedialkov, Dimitar (2001). Въздушната мощ на Царство България: Ч. 2. / Air Power of the Kingdom of Bulgaria, Pt. 2 (in Bulgarian and English). Sofia: Fark. OCLC 914554795.
- Nicolle, David (March–April 1999). "Young Turks: Ottoman Turkish Fighters 1915–1918". Air Enthusiast. No. 74. pp. 40–45. ISSN 0143-5450.
- Schmeelke, Michael (2018). Zeebrugge: Naval Air Station Flanders I 1914–1918. n. p.: Aeronaut Books. ISBN 978-1-935881-46-9.
