= Rumpler G.I =

German bomber biplane

G.I, G.II and G.III
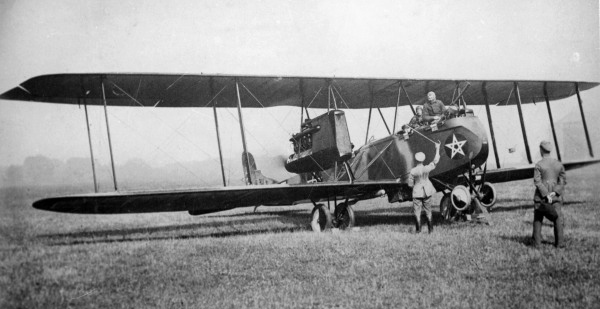
- Rumpler G.III

General information
- Type: Bomber aircraft
- National origin: Germany
- Manufacturer: Rumpler
- Primary user: Luftstreitkräfte
- Number built: c. 222

History
- First flight: 1915

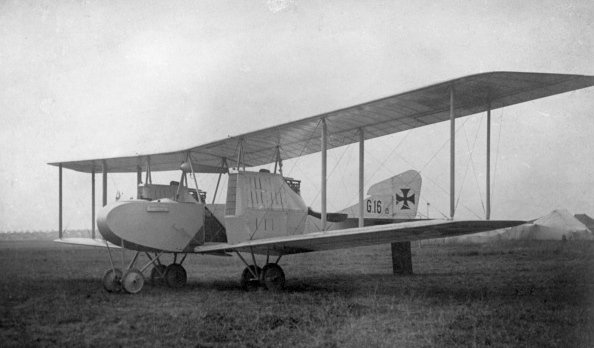
Rumpler G.I

The Rumpler G.I was a bomber aircraft produced in Germany during World War I, together with refined versions known as the G.II and G.III.

== Design and development ==
Based on a prototype with the factory designation 4A15, the G.I and its successors were built to a conventional bomber design for their time, two-bay biplanes with unstaggered wings of unequal span. The pilot sat in an open cockpit just forward of the wings, and open positions were provided in the nose and amidships for a gunner and observer. The engines were mounted pusher-fashion in nacelles atop the lower wings and enclosed in streamlined cowlings. Fixed tricycle undercarriage was fitted, with dual wheels on each unit.

The G.II version was almost identical, but featured more powerful engines and carried a second 7.92 mm (.312 in) machine gun and increased bombload. The G.III was again similar, but had engine nacelles that were now mounted on short struts clear of the lower wing.

== Variants ==
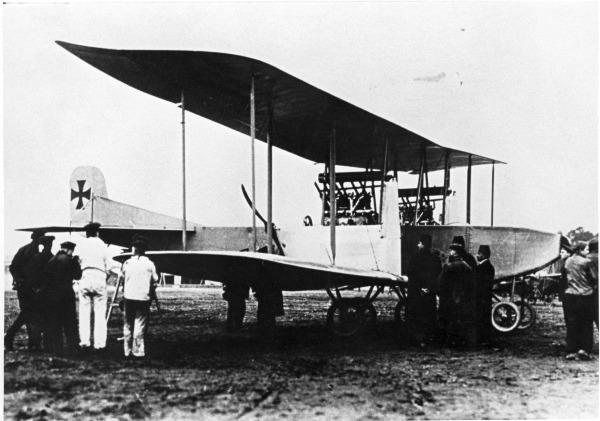
The Rumpler 4A 15 - prototype of the G.I

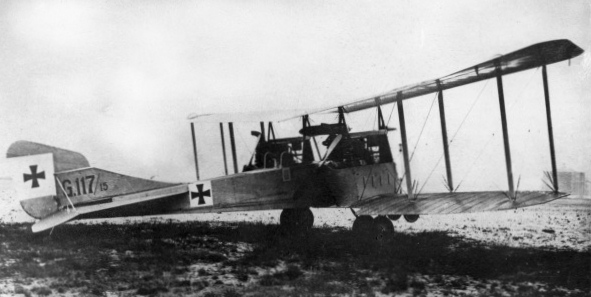
Rumpler G.II

- 4A15 - prototype with Benz Bz.III engines
- 5A15 - G.I production version with single machine gun and Benz Bz.III or Mercedes D.III engines (c. 60 built)
- 5A16 - G.II production version with Benz Bz.IV engines and two machine guns (c. 72 built)
- 6G2 - G.III production version with Mercedes D.IVa engines and two machine guns (c. 90 built)

== Specifications (G.III) ==
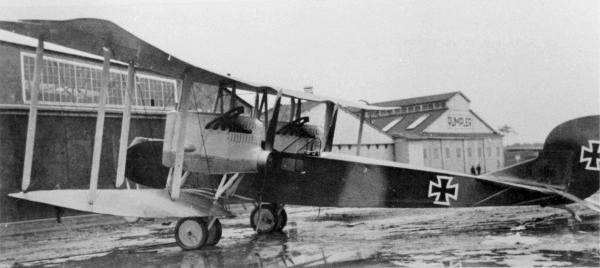
Rumpler G.III

Data from Kroschel & Stützer 1994, p.140

General characteristics

- Crew: Three
- Length: 12.00 m (39 ft 4 in)
- Wingspan: 19.30 m (63 ft 4 in)
- Height: 4.50 m (19 ft 2 in)
- Wing area: 73.0 m^{2} (785 sq ft)
- Empty weight: 2,365 kg (5,203 lb)
- Gross weight: 3,620 kg (7,964 lb)
- Powerplant: 2 × Mercedes D.IVa , 190 kW (260 hp) each

Performance

- Maximum speed: 165 km/h (103 mph, 90 kn)
- Range: 700 km (440 mi, 380 nmi)
- Service ceiling: 5,000 m (16,000 ft)

Armament

- 1 × trainable 7.92 mm (.312 in) Parabellum MG14 machine gun in nose
- 1 × trainable 7.92 mm (.312 in) Parabellum MG14 machine gun in dorsal position
- 250 kg (550 lb) of bombs
