= Sablatnig C.I =

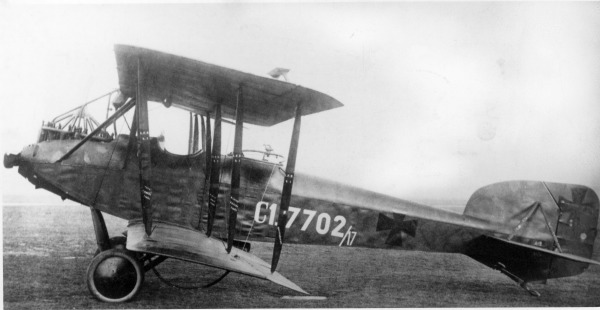

General information
- Type: Reconnaissance two-seater
- National origin: Germany
- Manufacturer: Sablatnig
- Number built: ~2

History
- Manufactured: 1917

The Sablatnig C.I was a conventional C-type reconnaissance two-seater aircraft developed and built by Sablatnig in Berlin, Germany in 1917. It was a two-bay biplane of conventional design, with staggered wings, two open cockpits in tandem, and fixed, tailskid undercarriage.

The C.I was developed into the Sablatnig N.I in 1918.

== Specifications ==
General characteristics

- Length: 8.7 m (28 ft 7 in)
- Wingspan: 16.0 m (52 ft 6 in)
- Empty weight: 1,050 kg (2,315 lb)
- Gross weight: 1,540 kg (3,395 lb)
- Powerplant: 1 × Argus As III , 130 kW (180 hp)
- Propellers: 2-bladed

Performance

- Maximum speed: 120 km/h (75 mph, 65 kn)
- Time to altitude: 9 min to 3,281 ft (1,000 m)

Armament

- Guns: 1 x Parabellum machine-gun
- Bombs: 6 x 110 lb (50 kg) bombs
