= Germania Flugzeugwerke =

German aircraft manufacturer

Germania Flugzeugwerke GmbH
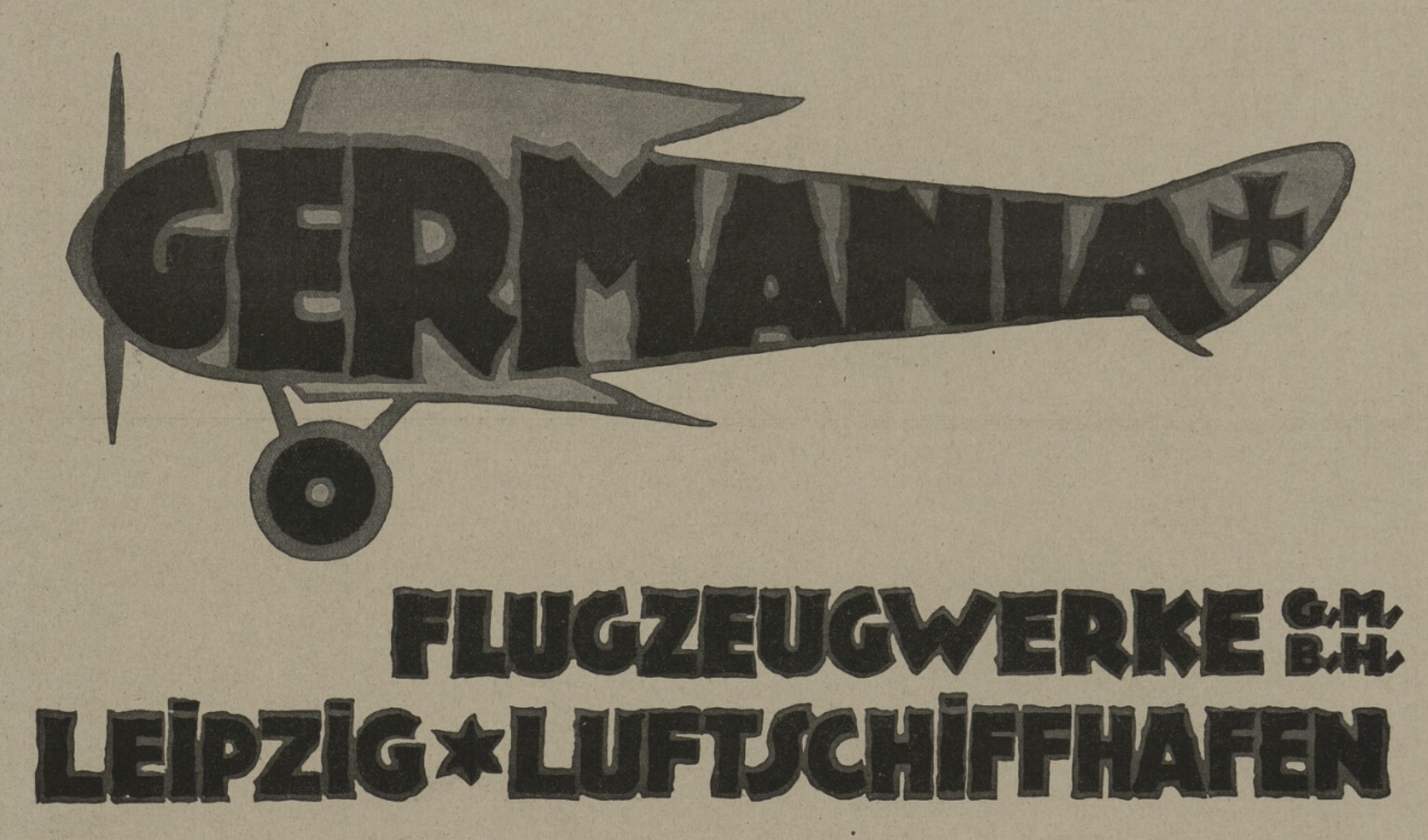
- Company type: GmbH
- Industry: Aircraft manufacturing
- Founded: 1912
- Defunct: 1922
- Headquarters: Leipzig, Germany
- Key people: John Frank Rahtjen, Richard Pemetzrieder (1921)
- Number of employees: 780 (1918)

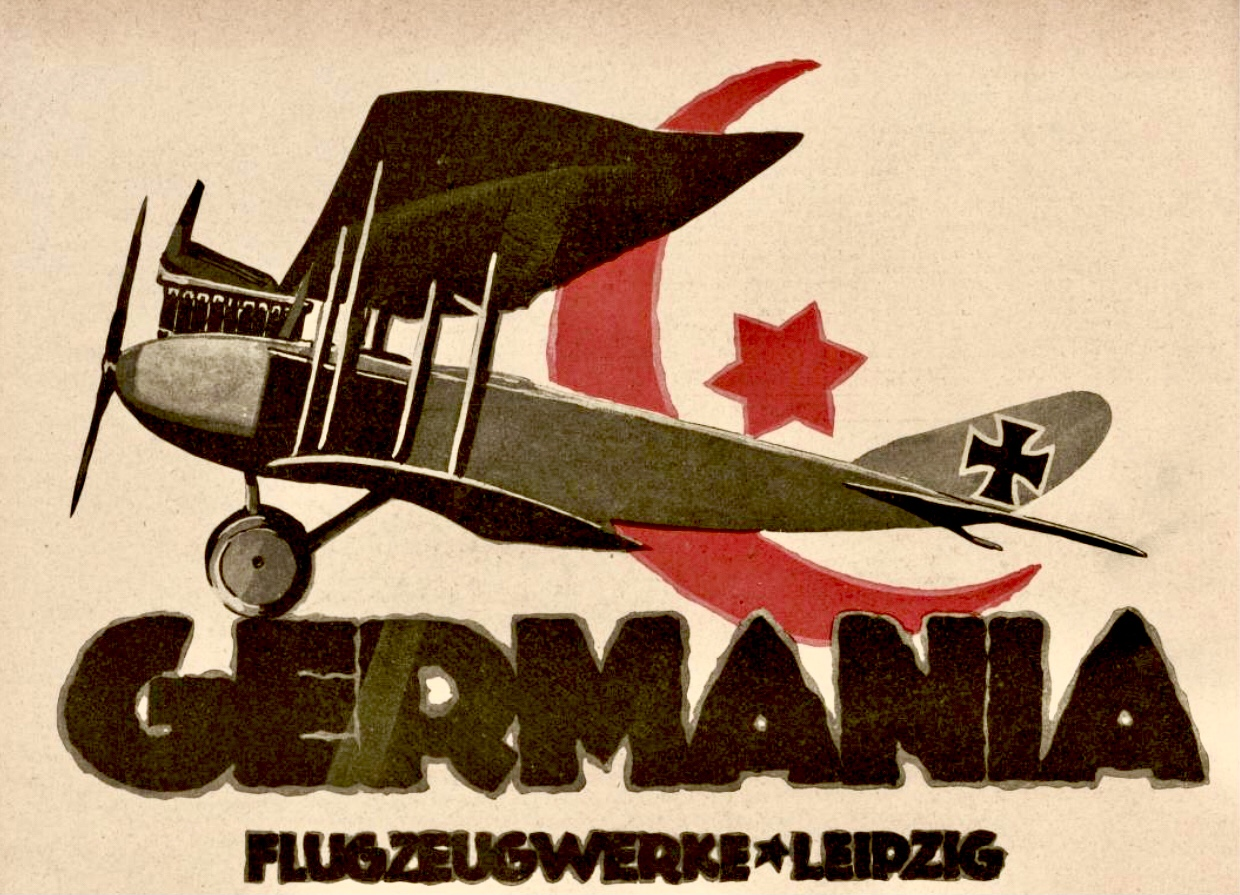
Germania (1918)

The Germania Flugzeugwerke GmbH was an aircraft manufacturing company based at Leipzig-Mockau Airport during World War I.

== History ==
The company was founded in 1912 by John Rahtjen and his son John Frank as Rahtjen & Co in Teltow. In 1914, it was renamed to Flugzeugwerke Rahtjen & Co in Berlin-Schöneberg. Josef Egwin Leiber was appointed as the chief designer, who also initially served as the managing director. He developed several original designs, most of which remained prototypes. At the Johannisthal Air Field in the first half of 1914, the construction of the Germania Taube began, a design similar to the Etrich Taube. The company relocated to Leipzig in December 1914, initially renting three halls from Luftschiffhafen- und Flugplatz A.G. (LEFAG) at the Mockau airfield, with an additional seven halls added by August 1915. From October 1915 to 1918, the size of the halls and production area doubled through gradual expansion. Mass production of the Rumpler C.I under license began in October 1916, with two more halls, an acetylene plant, and a military airbase constructed. In December of that year, military oversight was imposed on the operation. As food shortages became critical during the war, a war kitchen was established in June 1917, and vegetables were grown on the factory grounds for the workforce. Additional facilities such as a fuselage carpentry, a locksmith, an administrative building, and more aircraft hangars were built in 1917. Loading tracks were laid between the facing workshop halls, with a loading hall added in February 1918. Due to mass production, the workforce of Germania GmbH grew from 78 workers and employees in January 1916 to 780 in January 1918 within two years.

Between 1916 and 1918, approximately 800 C.I aircraft were produced under license for the German Air Force. Around 300 Rumpler aircraft of the types C.III and C.IV were refurbished from autumn 1917 until the end of the war. Germania Flugzeugwerke operated its own flight school from 1915, training up to 60 pilots on their own manufactured airplanes at times. In August 1918, two double halls, each 54 meters long, were constructed for this purpose; however, the planned accommodations for the flight students were not realized due to the armistice.

With the enforcement of the Treaty of Versailles after the war, aircraft production had to cease. By the end of 1918, Germania Flugzeugwerke was renamed to Mitteldeutsche Möbelfabrik GmbH and Werkstätten für Mechanik GmbH and divided. Production shifted to furniture and agricultural machinery. The company attempted to establish civilian air transportation by participating in air shows with demilitarized aircraft, but was thwarted by the provisions of the Treaty of Versailles. By 1919, the following types were not yet certified for civil aviation by the Reich Aviation Office: DFW C V, Ru. C I a, Germania C IV. Seventeen aircraft from Germania Flugzeugwerke were registered with the Reich Aviation Office. In early 1921, Chief Designer Egwin Leiber was dismissed immediately due to disagreements with the acting managing director Richard Pemetzrieder. The GmbH was dissolved on December 16, 1921, and the company liquidated until 1922. Finally, on August 24, 1925, the deletion was completed.

== Aircraft types ==
- Germania Taube: The Germania Taube was a monoplane from 1912, powered by a 50-horsepower four-cylinder engine from Argus, with a fuselage constructed in wood band tube design developed by Egwin Leiber. In 1914, two additional models were built with a 100-horsepower six-cylinder engine from Argus and delivered to the Army Administration and the Navy.
- B I: The B I was a biplane from 1915, with one unit built.
- C I: The C I was a biplane with dual struts and powered by a Maybach engine (260 hp), with only a prototype built.
- C II: The C II was a biplane from 1918 with a six-cylinder Argus engine (180 hp), with one unit built.
- C III: The C III was a biplane with dual struts and a 180-horsepower Argus engine, with one unit built.
- C IV: The C IV was a biplane with dual struts, powered by a 180-horsepower Argus engine, with one unit built.
- JM: The JM was a single-winged, single-seater biplane similar to the Roland Walfisch, with a prototype model.
- DB: The DB was an enlarged version of the JM from 1915, designed as a two-seater and powered by a 180-horsepower Argus engine, also known as the Germania Type D.
- KDD: The KDD was a combat biplane from 1916, with one unit built.
