= Rumpler C.III =

German WW I reconnaissance aircraft

C.III and C.V
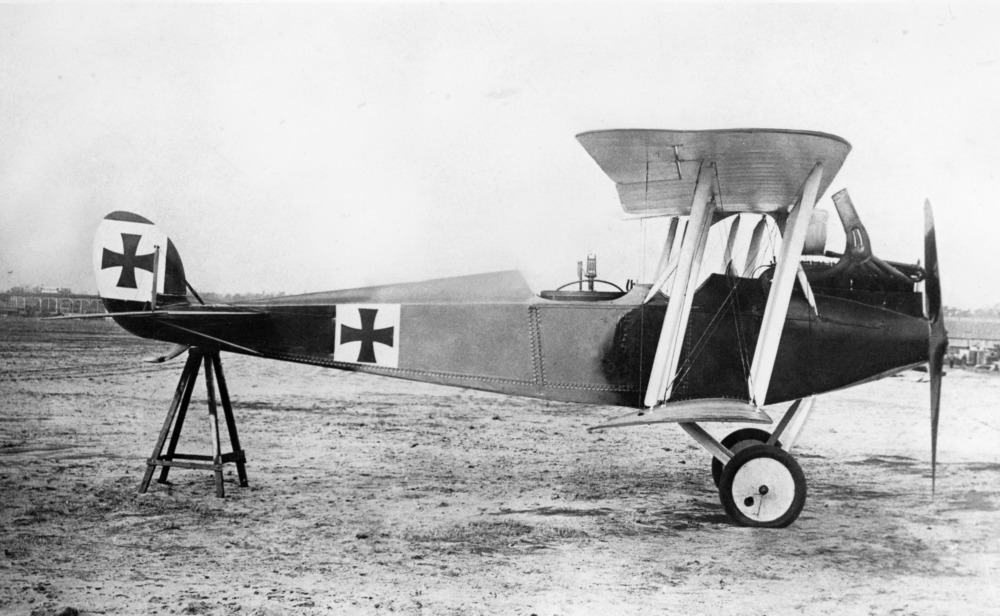

General information
- Type: Reconnaissance aircraft
- National origin: Germany
- Manufacturer: Rumpler

History
- First flight: 1916

The Rumpler C.III (factory designation 6A 5) was a biplane military reconnaissance aircraft built in Germany during World War I.

== Development ==
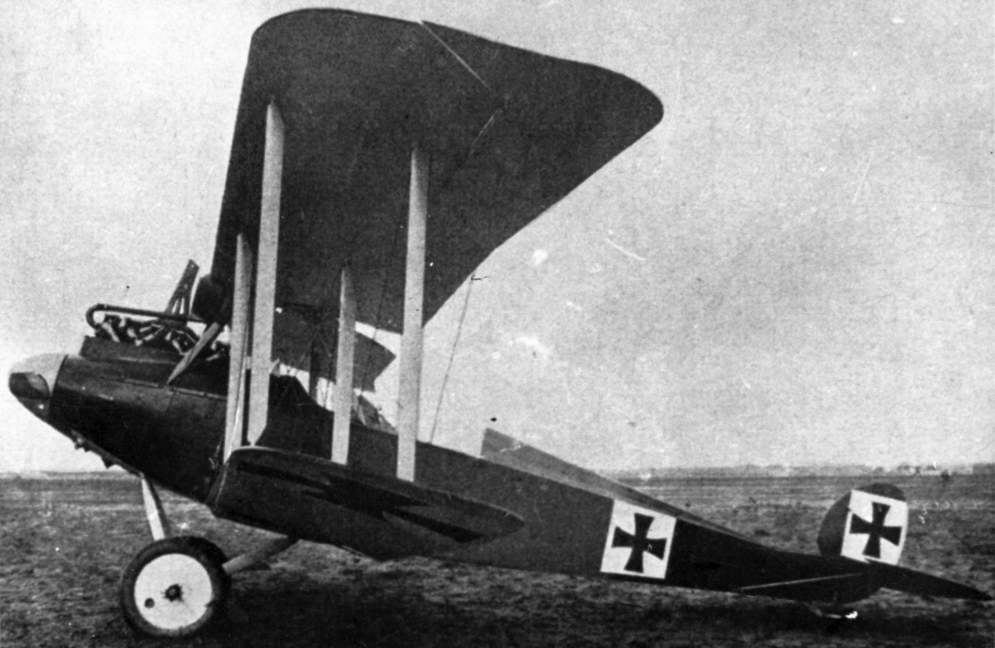
Rumpler C.III

It was a development of the Rumpler C.I design incorporating many aerodynamic refinements, including wing planform, airfoil section, and horn-balanced ailerons, revised empennage, and new rear fuselage decking with compound curves. This latter feature was later removed and replaced with a simplified structure, at which point the factory designation was changed to 6A 6. Performance was improved over that of the C.I, and the C.III was selected for limited production, thought to be about 75 aircraft. The Frontbestand table of C-type aircraft at the front shows a maximum of 42 C.III aircraft at the front on 28 February 1917. With the introduction of the more powerful Rumpler C.IV based on a refined C.III airframe, the number of operational C.III aircraft at the front dropped rapidly and by the autumn of 1917 only one was at the front. The C.III was a qualified success, but its design served mainly as a stepping stone to the further refined C.IV.

== Specifications (C.III) ==
Data from Kroschel & Stützer 1994, p.127

General characteristics

- Crew: Two, pilot and observer
- Length: 8.20 m (26 ft 11 in)
- Wingspan: 12.66 m (41 ft 6 in)
- Height: 3.25 m (10 ft 8 in)
- Wing area: 34.8 m^{2} (374 sq ft)
- Empty weight: 839 kg (1,845 lb)
- Gross weight: 1,264 kg (2,780 lb)
- Powerplant: 1 × Benz Bz.IV , 160 kW (220 hp)

Performance

- Maximum speed: 136 km/h (85 mph, 74 kn)
- Range: 480 km (300 mi, 260 nmi)
- Service ceiling: 4,000 m (13,100 ft)

Armament

- 1 × fixed, forward-firing 7.92 mm (.312 in) machine gun
- 1 × trainable, rearward-firing 7.92 mm (.312 in) machine gun
- 100 kg (220 lb) of bombs
