= Rumpler C.VI =

German First World War reconnaissance aircraft

C.VI

General information
- Type: High-altitude reconnaissance aircraft
- National origin: Germany
- Manufacturer: Rumpler

The Rumpler C.VI was a high-altitude reconnaissance aircraft used by the Germans during the First World War. The aircraft was designed, along with the C.VII, based on the previous success of high-altitude Zeppelins, from which the engine was also taken: the Maybach Mb.IVa high-altitude high-compression engine. To operate in thinner atmosphere, the aircraft also had a special carburetor and radiator. The radiator was half-sized to reduce weight.

== Bibliography ==
- Herris, Jack (2014). Rumpler Aircraft of WWI: A Centennial Perspective on Great War Airplanes. Great War Aviation Centennial Series. Vol. 11. n.p.: Aeronaut Books. ISBN 978-1-935881-21-6.
- Klaauw, Bart van der (March–April 1999). "Unexpected Windfalls: Accidentally or Deliberately, More than 100 Aircraft 'arrived' in Dutch Territory During the Great War". Air Enthusiast (80): 54–59. ISSN 0143-5450.
