= Rumpler C.VIII =

1917 German single-engine biplane advanced trainer

C.VIII
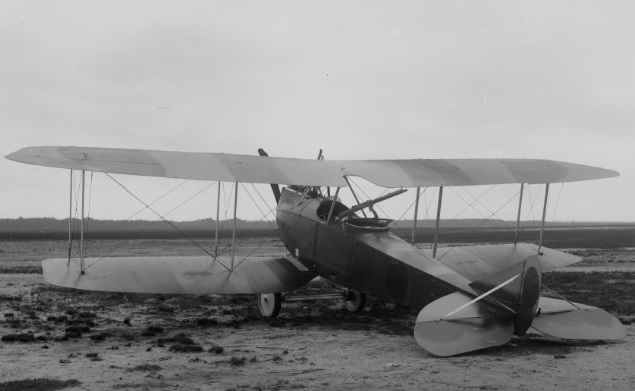

General information
- Type: Advanced trainer
- Manufacturer: Rumpler Flugzeugwerke
- Primary users: Luftstreitkräfte Finnish Air Force

History
- Introduction date: 1917
- First flight: 1917
- Retired: 1924 (Finland)

The Rumpler C.VIII was a German single-engine biplane advanced trainer manufactured by Rumpler Flugzeugwerke, in Berlin Johannisthal in 1917.

== Design and development ==
The C.VIII variant was developed with the intention of providing an operational trainer for aircrews nearing the end of their training with particular emphasis on the observers' curriculum of gunnery, observation, radio and photography. The aircraft was close to standards applicable to full military operation but could also be operated economically.

== Operational history ==
A strategic need for improved and intensified training in connection with an ultimate offensive on the Western Front in March 1918 existed. To facilitate this higher standard of training, the C.VIII was introduced towards the end of 1917 with the Flieger Ersatz Abteilungen, i.e. Flying Training Units.

== Operators ==
German Empire

- Luftstreitkräfte

Finland

- The Finnish Air Force ordered one aircraft in February 1918. It was used by the Finnish White army as a reconnaissance aircraft. The aircraft remained in Finnish Air Force use until 1924.

Netherlands

- The Dutch Air Force ordered 40 aircraft in 1918. The aircraft were traded, for among other, 5000 horses. The aircraft were used only briefly, because of a number of fires in the aircraft.

Poland

- Polish Air Force 6 aircraft captured in 1918.

== Specifications (C.VIII) ==
Data from German Aircraft of the First World War, and Suomen Ilmavoimat I 1918-27

General characteristics

- Crew: 1
- Length: 8 m (26 ft 3 in)
- Wingspan: 12.2 m (40 ft 0 in)
- Height: 3.2 m (10 ft 6 in)
- Wing area: 36.2 m^{2} (390 sq ft)
- Empty weight: 874 kg (1,927 lb)
- Gross weight: 1,374 kg (3,029 lb)
- Powerplant: × Argus As III 6-cylinder water-cooled in-line piston engine, 134 kW (180 hp)
- Propellers: 2-bladed fixed-pitch propeller

Performance

- Maximum speed: 140 km/h (87 mph, 76 kn)
- Endurance: approx. 4 hours
- Service ceiling: 4,000 m (13,000 ft)
- Time to altitude:

1,000 m (3,300 ft) in 4 minutes 15 seconds
2,000 m (6,600 ft) in 11 minutes
3,000 m (9,800 ft) in 21 minutes
4,000 m (13,000 ft) in 37 minutes 30 seconds

Armament

- Guns: 1x fixed-forward-firing synchronised 7.92 mm (0.312 in) LM 08 Spandau machine gun; 1x flexibly mounted 7.92 mm (0.312 in) Parabellum MG 14 machine-gun in the rear cockpit
- Bombs: 50 kg (110 lb) of bombs

== See also ==
Related lists

- List of military aircraft of Germany
