= Rumpler C.IV =

German reconnaissance biplane

C.IV
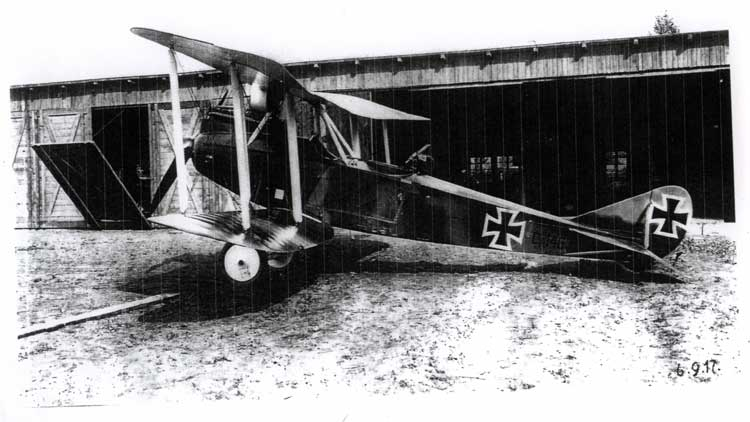

General information
- Type: Reconnaissance aircraft
- Manufacturer: Rumpler Flugzeugwerke
- Designer: Dr. Edmund Rumpler
- Primary user: Luftstreitkräfte

History
- Introduction date: 1917
- Variant: Rumpler 6B-2

The Rumpler C.IV was a German single-engine, two-seat reconnaissance biplane. It was a development of C.III with different tail surfaces and using a Mercedes D.IVa engine in place of the C.III's Benz Bz.IV. The Rumpler 6B 2 was a single-seat floatplane fighter variant with a 120 kW (160 hp) Mercedes D.III engine built for the Kaiserliche Marine (Imperial Navy).

For a two-seater reconnaissance aircraft, Rumpler C.IV had an excellent performance, which enabled it to remain in front-line service until the end of World War I on the Western Front, as well as in Italy and Palestine. Its exceptional ceiling allowed pilots to undertake reconnaissance secure in the knowledge that few allied aircraft could reach it.

300 aircraft were licence-built by Pfalz Flugzeugwerke as the Pfalz C.I, differing in ailerons on all four wings. From February 1917 they were renamed Rumpler C.IV (Pfal).

For use during filming, Slingsby Sailplanes built two Slingsby T.58 Rumpler C.IV replicas. While these were visually similar to the original aircraft, they were structurally completely different, having a steel-tube fuselage structure and wooden wings, and being powered by a de Havilland Gipsy Major engine.

== Variants ==
Rumpler C.IV
Pfalz C.I
Production by Pfalz, with ailerons on all four wings: 300 built.
Rumpler C.IV (Pfal)
The Pfalz C.I re-designated
Slingsby T.58 Rumpler C.IV replica
Slingsby Sailplanes built two Slingsby T.58 Rumpler C.IV replicas. While these were visually similar to the original aircraft, they were structurally completely different, having a steel-tube fuselage structure and wooden wings, and being powered by a de Havilland Gipsy Major engine
Rumpler 6B 2
floatplane fighter

== Operators ==
Belgium

- SNETA (post-war)

German Empire

- Luftstreitkrafte
- Kaiserliche Marine

Switzerland

- Swiss Air Force

Turkey

- Ottoman Air Force

Kingdom of Yugoslavia

- Yugoslav Royal Air Force - Postwar.

== Specifications (C.IV) ==
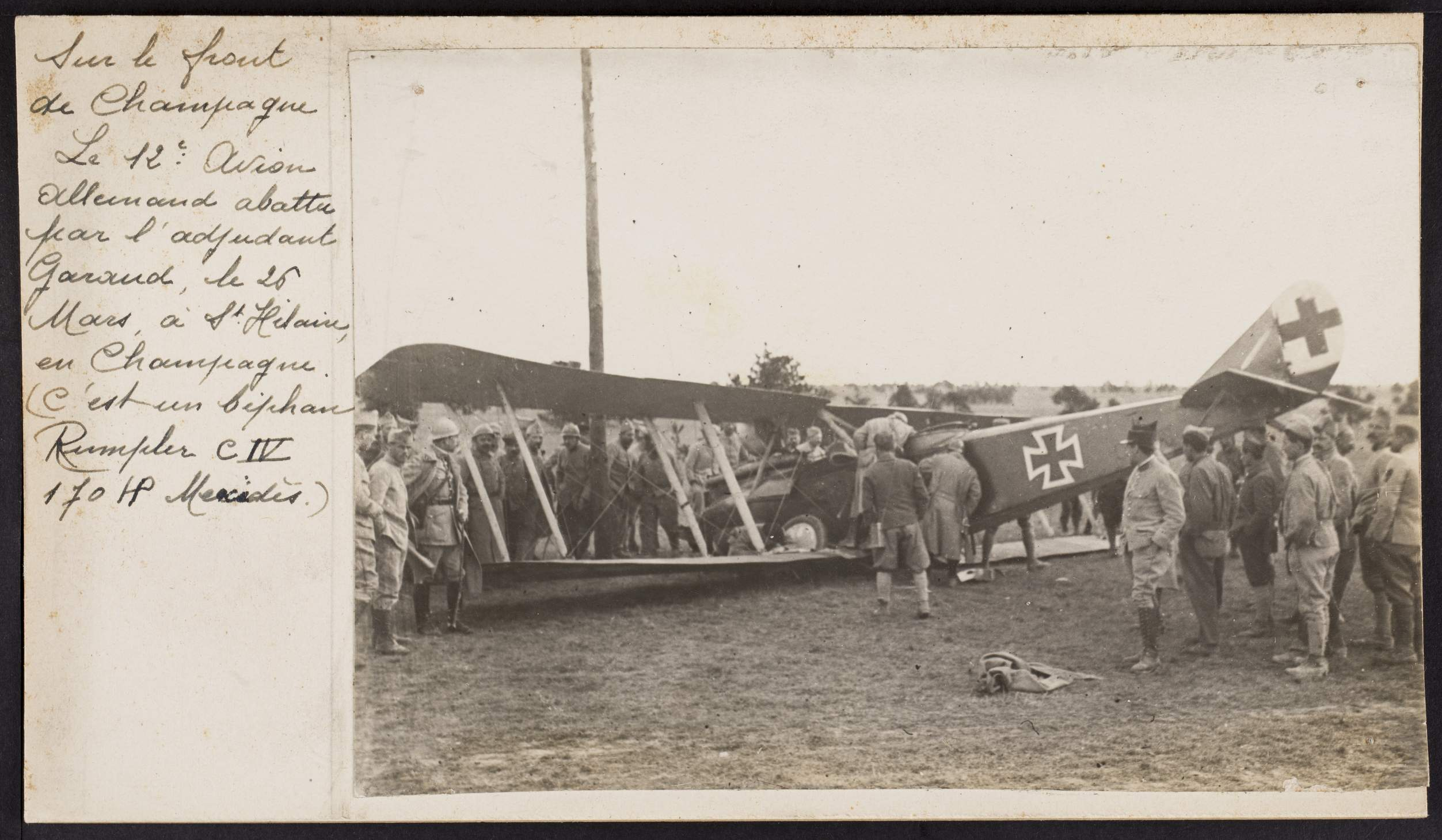
Rumpler CIV shot down near Châlons-sur-Marne by French ace Hector Garaud.

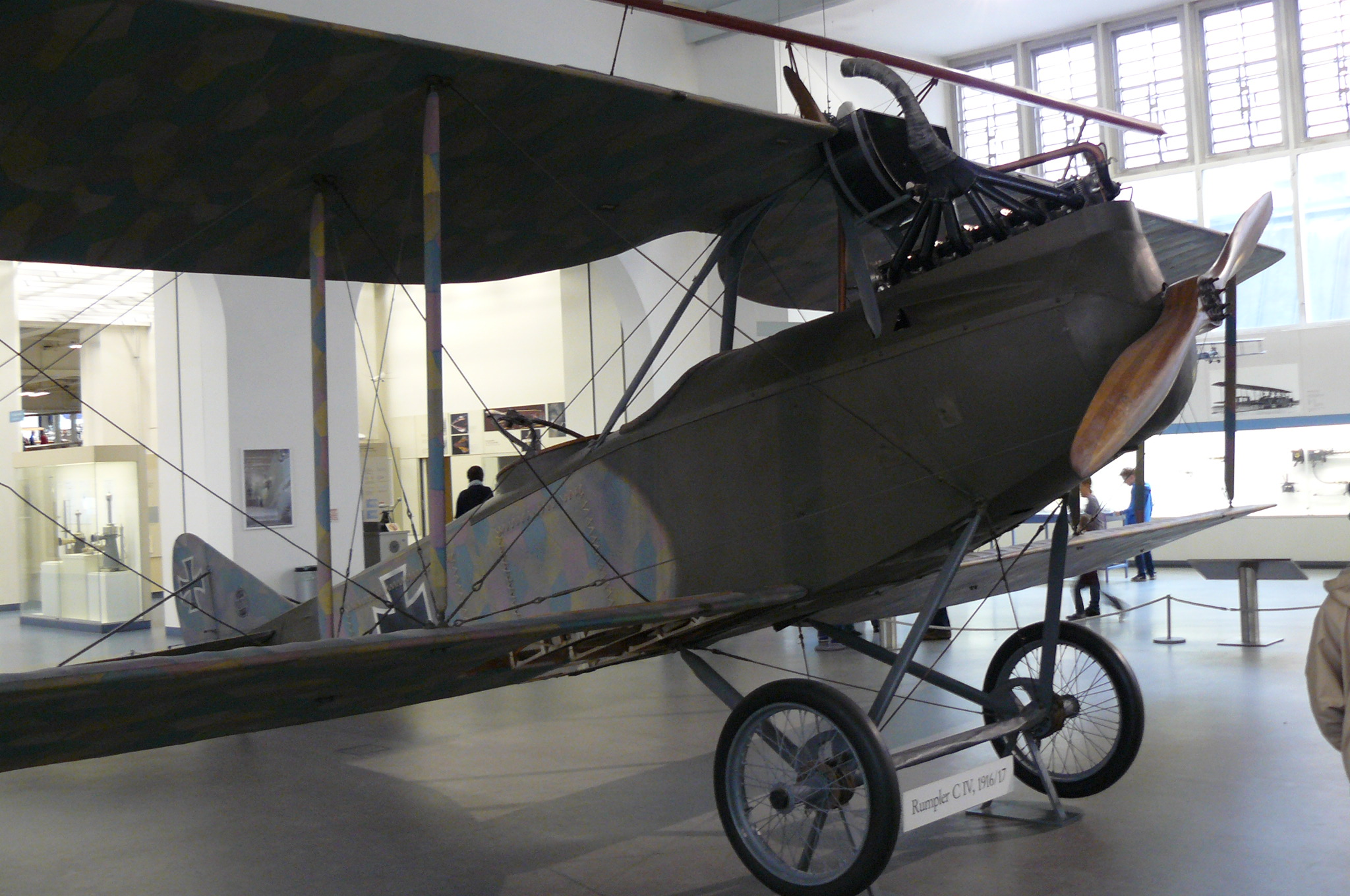
Surviving Rumpler C.IV as seen in Deutsches Museum

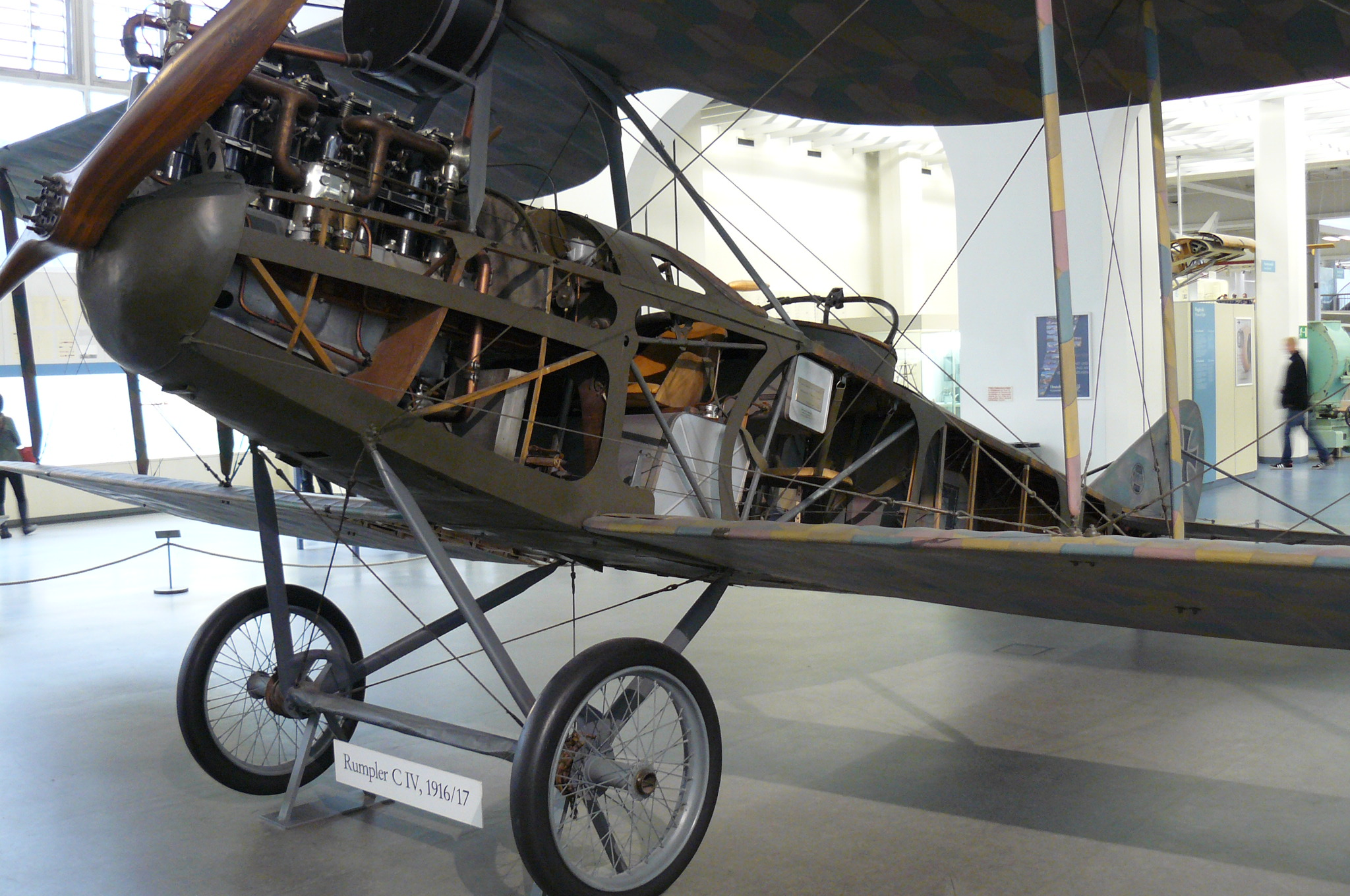
Rumpler C.IV inside visible

Data from German Aircraft Of The First World War

General characteristics

- Crew: 2 (pilot and observer)
- Length: 8.41 m (27 ft 7 in)
- Wingspan: 12.66 m (41 ft 6 in)
- Height: 3.25 m (10 ft 8 in)
- Wing area: 33.5 m^{2} (361 sq ft)
- Empty weight: 1,080 kg (2,381 lb)
- Gross weight: 1,530 kg (3,373 lb)
- Powerplant: 1 × Mercedes D.IVa 6-cylinder water-cooled in-line piston engine, 190 kW (260 hp)
- Propellers: 2-bladed fixed-pitch propeller

Performance

- Maximum speed: 171 km/h (106 mph, 92 kn) at 500 m (1,600 ft)
- Endurance: 3½-4 hr
- Service ceiling: 6,400 m (21,000 ft)

Armament

- Guns: 1 × fixed, forward-firing 7.92 mm (.312 in) LMG 08/15 with an interruptor gear and 1 × 7.92 mm (.312 in) Parabellum MG14 machine gun on a ring mounting
- Bombs: 100 kg (220 lb) of bombs

== See also ==
Aircraft of comparable role, configuration, and era

- Albatros C.X
- LVG C.VI
- Salmson 2
