= Rumpler =

German aircraft manufacturer

Rumpler-Werke
- Industry: Aircraft and automobile manufacture
- Predecessor: Edmund Rumpler Luftfahrzeugbau; Rumpler-Luftfahrzeugbau GmbH
- Founded: 1909
- Founder: Edmund Rumpler
- Defunct: 1925
- Fate: Liquidated
- Successor: none
- Headquarters: Berlin, Germany
- Key people: Edmund Rumpler
- Products: Aircraft, automobiles
- Number of employees: 3300 (1918)

Rumpler-Luftfahrzeugbau GmbH, Rumpler-Werke, usually known simply as Rumpler was a German aircraft and automobile manufacturer.

== History ==
Founded in Berlin by Austrian engineer Edmund Rumpler in 1909 as Rumpler Luftfahrzeugbau. The firm originally manufactured copies of the Etrich Taube monoplane under the Rumpler Taube trademark, but turned to building reconnaissance biplanes of its own design through the course of the First World War, in addition to a smaller number of fighters and bombers.

The company, from the beginning a limited liability concern (GmbH), became a Aktiengesellschaft and changed its name, to Rumpler-Werke AG, on 21 September 1917, with a capitalization of 3,5 million Marks.

In 1918, 3,300 people worked for Rumpler at the Berlin headquarters and a subsidiary in Augsburg, the Bayerische Rumpler-Werke AG.

As a consequence of the Treaty of Versailles Germany was not allowed to manufacture aircraft. Rumpler instead attempted to secure a place in the post-war automobile market, which led to the development of a vehicle with the first effective aerodynamic chassis, the Rumpler Tropfenwagen, on the premises of its Augsburg subsidiary. It was shown at the 1921 Internationale Automobil Ausstellung in Berlin.

The car failed to attract sufficient sales and the Bayerische Rumpler-Werke AG went into receivership in 1923, followed by the Rumpler-Werke AG in Berlin in 1925. The assets were liquidated in 1926, with the Augsburg premises bought on 30 July 1926 by the Bayerische Flugzeugwerke, predecessor of Messerschmitt.

== Aircraft ==
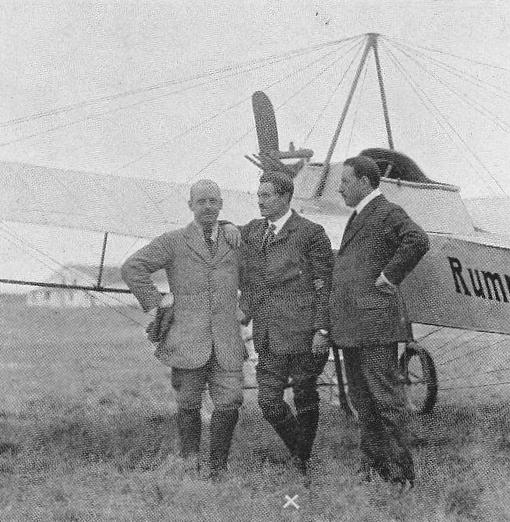
Hellmuth Hirth (Middle.) and Rumpler (right.) 1911

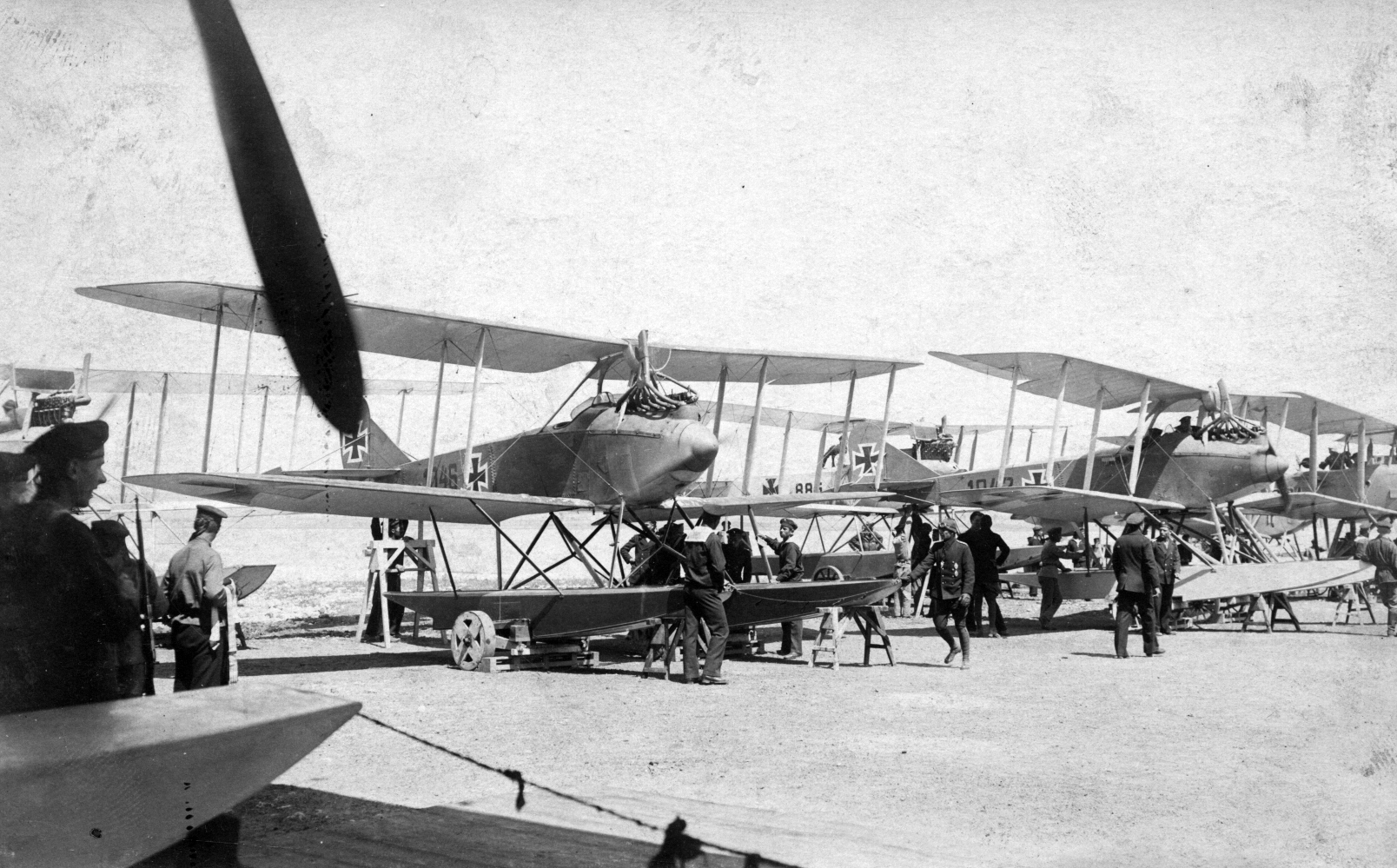
Rumpler 6B1 lineup

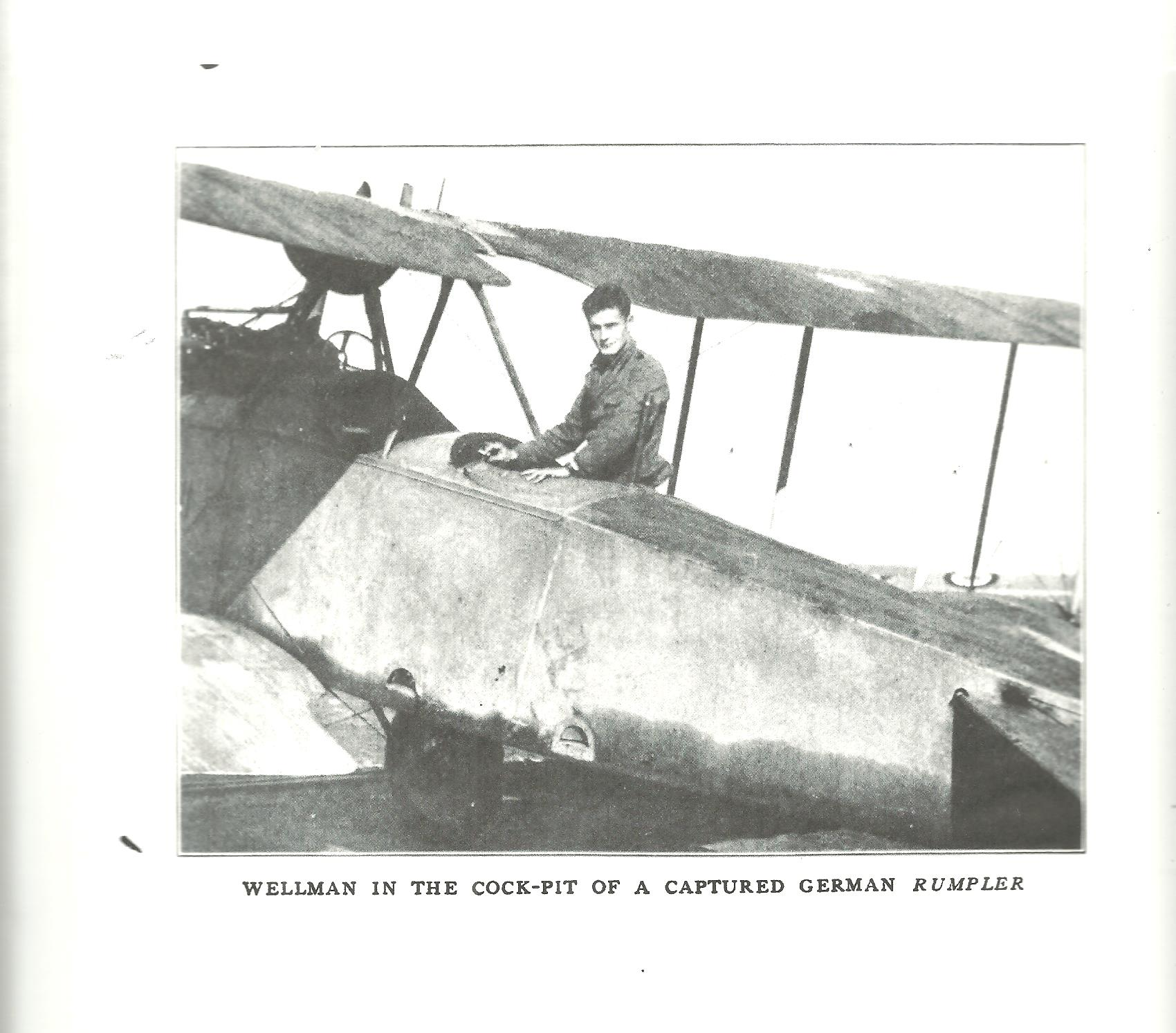
William Augustus Wellman of Escadrille 89 in a captured German Rumpler 1918

- Rumpler 6B
- Rumpler B.I
- Rumpler C.I
- Rumpler C.III
- Rumpler C.IV
- Rumpler C.V
- Rumpler C.VI
- Rumpler C.VII
- Rumpler C.VIII
- Rumpler C.X
- Rumpler D.I
- Rumpler G.I
- Rumpler G.II
- Rumpler G.III

== See also ==
- List of aircraft manufacturers
- List of Rumpler Aircraft
- Rumpler Tropfenwagen
