= Rumpler C.I =

WWI German reconnaissance aircraft

C.I
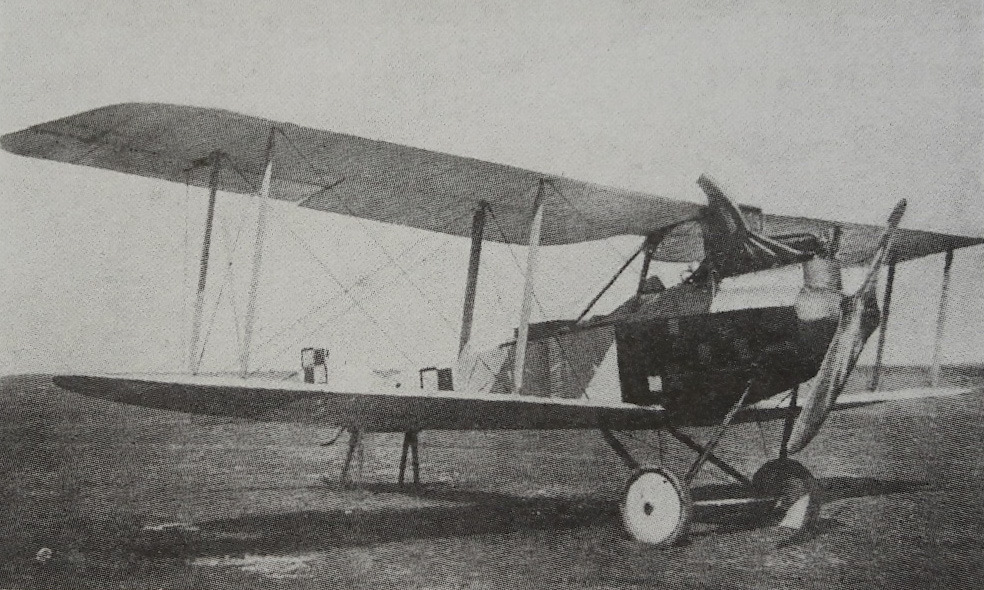

General information
- Type: Reconnaissance aircraft
- Manufacturer: Rumpler Flugzeugwerke
- Primary users: Luftstreitkräfte Poland

History
- Manufactured: 1915 - 1917
- Introduction date: 1915
- Variant: Rumpler 6B-1

Entering service in 1915, the Rumpler C.I, (company designation 5A 2), two-seater single-engine reconnaissance biplane, was one of the first German C-type aircraft, and also one of the longest serving in its class during World War I, being retired from the last front line units only in early 1918.

== Design and development ==
The C.I was a successful design, it was used on the Western and Eastern Fronts as well as in Macedonia, Salonika and Palestine. Early production examples were armed only with a single Parabellum machine gun on a Schneider ring mounting, but later aircraft had additionally a synchronised Spandau machine gun on the port side of fuselage. When used as a light bomber the C.I could also carry 100 kg of bombs.

In addition to the parent company Rumpler, the C.I was also produced by the Germania Flugzeugwerke, the Märkische Flugzeug-Werke, the Hannoversche Waggonfabrik and the Albert Rinne Flugzeug-Werke from 1915 to 1917. Variants included the C.Ia, which used a 180 hp Argus As.III engine instead of Mercedes D.III, the C.II, of which there's no evidence that any were actually built, 6B 1 single-seat floatplane fighter, and a Rumpler-built batch of C.Is intended for training which omitted the gun ring in the rear cockpit and was powered by a 150 hp Benz Bz.III.

It was this training role in which the C.I was latterly used, its friendly handling qualities making it suitable to be flown even by inexperienced pilots.

== Operators ==
German Empire

- Luftstreitkrafte

Latvia

- Latvian Air Force - Postwar.

Lithuania

- Lithuanian Air Force - Postwar. 3 aircraft (No. 2699, 4936, 8144) purchased in 1919.

Poland

- Polish Air Force - Postwar.

Turkey

- Ottoman Air Force

Kingdom of Yugoslavia

- Royal Yugoslav Air Force - Postwar.

== Specifications (C.I) ==
Data from German Aircraft of the First World War

General characteristics

- Crew: 2
- Length: 7.85 m (25 ft 9 in)
- Wingspan: 12.15 m (39 ft 10 in)
- Height: 3.06 m (10 ft 0 in)
- Wing area: 35.7 m^{2} (384 sq ft)
- Empty weight: 793 kg (1,748 lb)
- Gross weight: 1,333 kg (2,939 lb)
- Fuel capacity: 240 L (63 US gal; 53 imp gal) in 200 L (53 US gal; 44 imp gal)main fuselage tank and 40 L (11 US gal; 8.8 imp gal) centre-section gravity tank
- Powerplant: 1 × Mercedes D.III 6-cylinder water-cooled in-line piston engine, 120 kW (160 hp)

Alternative engines:

- 134 kW (180 hp) Argus As.III in C.Ia aircraft from Hannoversche Waggonfabrik
- 112 kW (150 hp) Benz Bz.III in Bayru-built C.Is, modified as trainers with dual control. (Bayru. - Bayerische Rumpler Werke)

- Propellers: 2-bladed fixed-pitch propeller

Performance

- Maximum speed: 152 km/h (94 mph, 82 kn) at sea level
- Endurance: 4 hours
- Service ceiling: 5,050 m (16,570 ft)
- Wing loading: 36 kg/m^{2} (7.4 lb/sq ft)

Armament

== See also ==
Aircraft of comparable role, configuration, and era

- Albatros C.I
- Royal Aircraft Factory R.E.8
