= Argus As III =

1910s German piston aircraft engine

As III
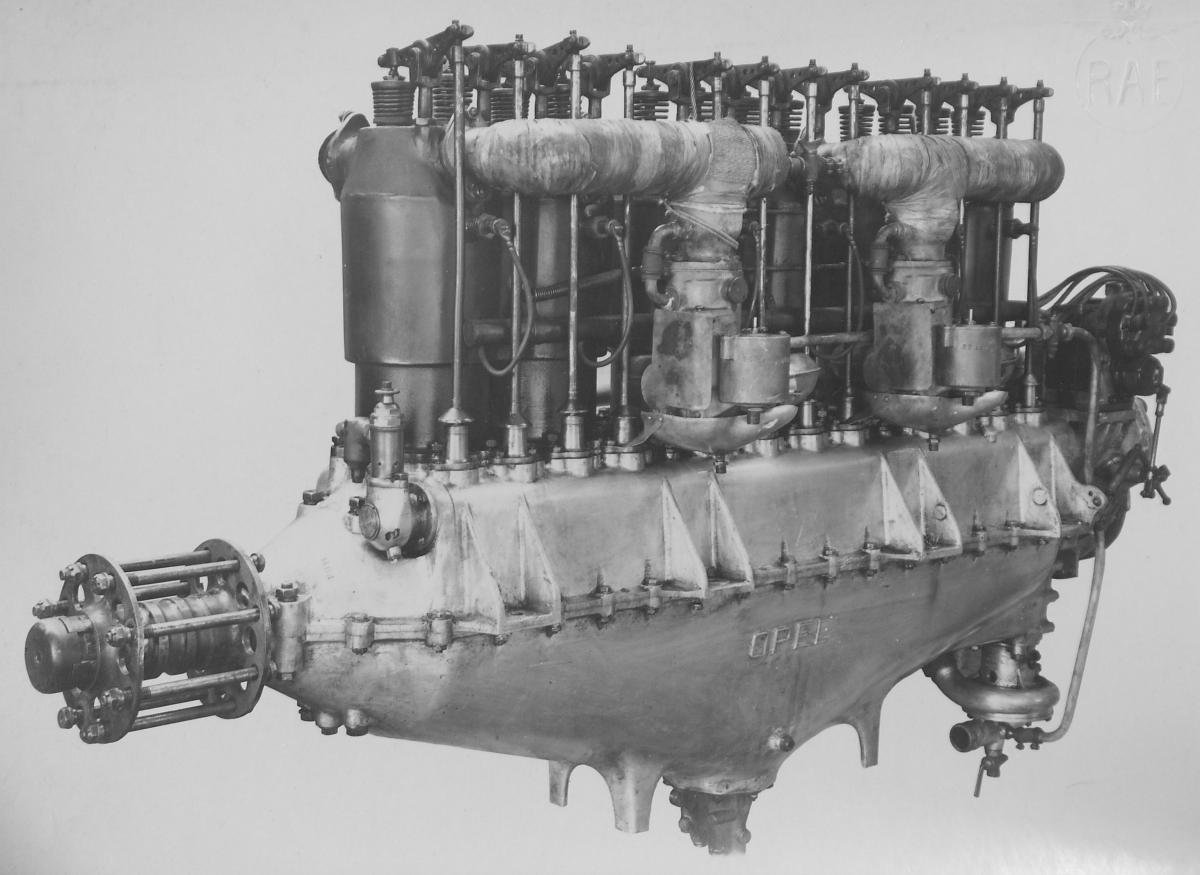
- License produced Opel Argus As III, image from a 1919 United Kingdom Air Ministry report.
- Type: Piston aircraft engine
- Manufacturer: Argus Motoren
- First run: c.1916

The Argus As III was a six-cylinder, in-line, water-cooled, aircraft engine produced in Germany by Argus Motoren during World War I. The Argus As III produced 180 hp (130 kW) at 1,400 rpm.

== Design and development ==
Argus Motoren already supplied a limited number 150 hp and 200 hp aircraft engines to the Imperial German Navy in the Summer of 1914. As these engines did not prove successful Argus decided to concentrate its development efforts on an improved 180 hp (130 kW) six-cylinder type which became accepted into service in January 1916 as the Argus As III. License production of the engine was ordered at Deutz, Güldner, M.A.N., Opel and Stoewer. First operational experience with the engine however proved troublesome, with overheating problems occurring among other things. These problems were only solved after several improvements of the engine and so it took until the end of 1917 for the engine to attain its full operational maturity.

== Applications ==
- AEG C.IV
- Albatros B.II
- Albatros C.I
- Albatros C.III
- Gotha G.IV
- Hannover CL.II
- Hannover CL.IIIa
- LFG Roland D.II
- LFG Roland D.III
- Rumpler C.I
- Rumpler C.VIII
- Sablatnig C.I

== Specifications ==
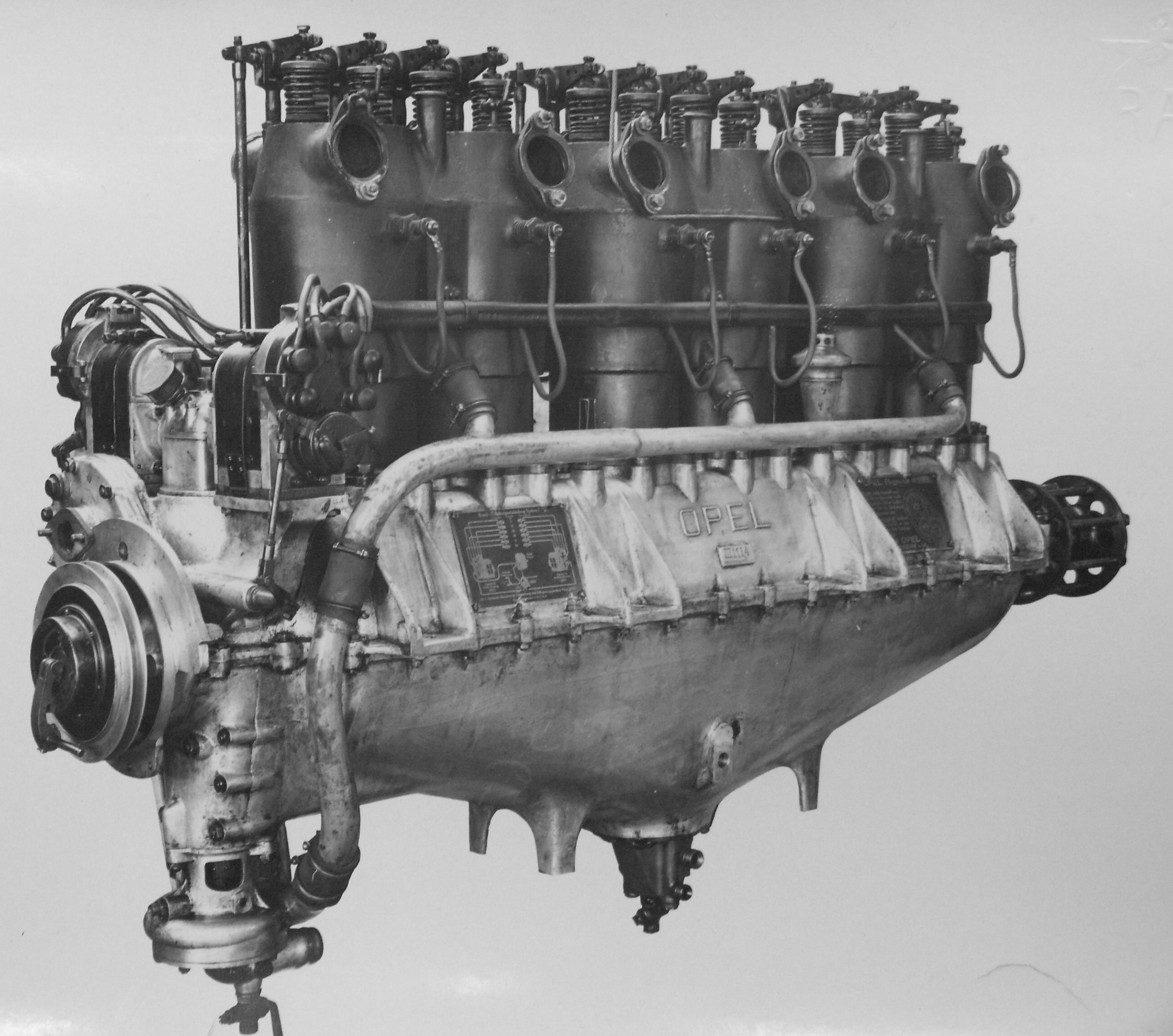
License produced Opel Argus As III, right side view

Data from Huth. (cf. Angle: Opel As III)

=== General characteristics ===
- Type: Six-cylinder, upright, inline piston engine
- Bore: 145 mm (5.71 in)
- Stroke: 160 mm (6.30 in)
- Displacement: 15.9 L (970 cu in)
- Dry weight: 295 kg (650 lb)

=== Components ===
- Valvetrain: Overhead-valve, two valves per cylinder, pushrod operated
- Fuel system: Twin carburettors
- Oil system: Pressure feed
- Cooling system: Liquid-cooled
- Reduction gear: Direct drive
- Twin Bosch ignition magnetos

=== Performance ===
- Power output: 180 hp (130 kW) at 1,400 rpm
- Compression ratio: 4.8

== See also ==
Comparable engines

- BMW IIIa
- Liberty L-6
- Mercedes D.III

Related lists

- List of aircraft engines
