= List of aircraft (St) =

This is a list of aircraft in alphabetical order beginning with 'St'.

== St ==
=== St Andrews Aviation ===
(Panama City, Florida, United States)

- St Andrews Viking

=== St Croix ===
(St Croix Aircraft)

- St Croix Excelsior
- St Croix Pietenpol Aerial
- St Croix Pietenpol Aircamper
- St Croix Sopwith Triplane

=== St. George ===
- St. George Falcon
- St. George KIT-1
- St. George KIT-2
- St. George 1912 helicopter

=== St. Louis ===
(St. Louis Aircraft Co, 8000 N Broadway, St. Louis MO.)

- St Louis C2-60 Cardinal
- St Louis C2-65
- St Louis C2-85 Cardinal
- St Louis C2-90 Senior Cardinal
- St Louis C2-100 Special
- St Louis C2-100 Super Cardinal
- St Louis C2-110 Super Cardinal
- St Louis PT-1W (Company designation)
- St Louis PT-35 (Company designation)
- St Louis PT-LM-4 (Company designation)
- St Louis CG-5
- St Louis CG-6
- St Louis PT-15

=== St-Just Aviation ===
(Boucherville, Quebec, Canada)

- St-Just Cyclone
- St-Just Super-Cyclone

=== Stabilaire ===
(Stabilaire Inc (Albert J Downs), Wenham MA)

- Stabilaire A

=== Stadlman ===
(Anthony Stadlman & J E Roth, Chicago IL.)

- Stadlman Exhibition Biplane

=== Stadtler (aircraft constructor) ===
()

- Stadtler Triplane

=== Stafford ===
(T G Stafford, Black Mountain NC.)

- Stafford A-2
- Stafford TG Sport

=== Stafford ===
(Walter Stafford/Justacrate Airplane Co, Greenville SC.)

- Justacrate Black Buzzard

=== Stahlwerk-Mark ===
(Stahlwerk Mark Flugzeugbau)

- Stahlwerk-Mark R.III
- Stahlwerk-Mark R.IV
- Stahlwerk-Mark R.V
- Stahlwerk-Mark MD.I
- Stahlwerk-Mark ME.I
- Stahlwerk-Mark ME.II
- Stahlwerk-Mark MS.II
- Stahlwerk-Mark W.I

=== Staib ===
(Wilbur Staib, Carthage MO.)

- Staib DM
- Staib Special
- Staib LB-1 Special
- Staib LB-2
- Staib Little Bastard
- Staib The Monster
- Staib LB-3
- Staib LB-4
- Staib Airy-Plane
- Staib LB-5
- Staib Little Bit
- Staib Helicopter

=== Stalker (aircraft constructor) ===
- Stalker CB-301
- Stalker CB-310 Tomboy

=== Stallings ===
(Jerry Stallings, Houston TX.)

- Stallings Air Master

=== Stampe et Renard ===
- Stampe et Renard SR.6
- Stampe et Renard SR.7
- Stampe et Renard SR.8
- Stampe et Renard SR.9
- Stampe et Renard SR.10
- Stampe et Renard SR.11
- Stampe et Renard SR.12

=== Stampe et Vertongen ===
(J. Stampe et M. Vertongen)

- Stampe et Vertongen RSV.18
- Stampe et Vertongen RSV.20/100
- Stampe et Vertongen RSV.22
- Stampe et Vertongen RSV.23/180
- Stampe et Vertongen RSV.26/100
- Stampe et Vertongen RSV.26/140
- Stampe et Vertongen RSV.28
- Stampe et Vertongen RSV.32
- Stampe et Vertongen SV.4
- Stampe et Vertongen SV.5 Tornado
- Stampe et Vertongen SV.6
- Stampe et Vertongen SV.7
- Stampe et Vertongen SV.8
- Stampe et Vertongen SV.9
- Stampe et Vertongen SV.10
- Stampe et Vertongen SV.18
- Stampe et Vertongen SV.26

=== Standard ===
(Standard Aircraft Corp, Plainfield NJ.)

- Standard E-1 (M-Defense)
- Standard E-4
- Gates-Day GD-24
- Standard H-1
- Standard H-2
- Standard H-3
- Standard H-4-H
- Standard J-1
- Standard JR-1
- Standard SJ-1
- Standard SJ (not directly related to SJ-1)
- Standard Twin-Hydro
- Standard TH-D

=== Stapp ===
(E Graydon Stapp, Alanread TX.)

- Stapp B-1

=== Star ===
(Star Engineering Company)

- Star 1910 Monoplane

=== Star ===
(Star Aircraft Div, Phillips Petroleum Co, Bartlesville OK)

- Star Cavalier A
- Star Cavalier B
- Star Cavalier C
- Star Cavalier D
- Star Cavalier E
- Star Cavalier F

=== Star ===
(Star Aviation, New Braunfels TX.)

- Star Lone Star Sport Helicopter

=== Star Bee Gyros ===
(Star Bee Gyros LLC, Worcester, Massachusetts)

- Star Bee Light
- Star Bee Total Bee

=== Star Flight ===
(Star Flight Manufacturing)

- Star Flight Starfire
- Star Flight Tristar
- Star Flight TX-1000
- Star Flight SC-1000
- Star Flight AC-2000

=== Star-Kraft ===
(Star-Kraft, Ft Scott KS.)

- Star-Kraft 700

=== Star-Lite ===
(Star-Lite Aircraft Inc, San Antonio, Texas, United States)

- Star-Lite SL-1
- Star-Lite Aircraft Star Lite

=== Star-Lite ===
(Star-Lite Engineering Ltd, Englewood, Ohio, United States)

- Star-Lite Warp 1-A

=== Star-Nickel ===
- Star-Nickel SN.01

=== Starck ===
(André Starck / Avions Starck)

- Starck Chanute-style glider
- Starck AS.07 Stabiplan
- Starck AS.10
- Starck AS.20
- Starck AS.27 Starcky
- Starck AS.37
- Starck AS.57
- Starck AS.70 Jac
- Starck AS.71
- Starck AS.72
- Starck AS.75
- Starck AS.80 Holiday (a.k.a. Lavadoux)
- Starck AS.90 New Look
- Starck Super New Look
- Starck-Nickel SN.01

=== Starfire ===
(Starfire Aviation Inc, Tempe, Arizona, United States)

- Starfire Firebolt
- Starfire Firebolt Convertible

=== Stargate ===
(Stargate Inc., McMinnville, Oregon, United States)

- Stargate YT-33

=== Starling ===
(Starling Aircraft Co., 224 N 1st St, Minneapolis MN.)

- Starling H-11
- Starling H-12 Imperial

=== Starr ===
(Robert H Starr, Phoenix AZ. )

- Starr Bumble Bee I
- Starr Bumble Bee II

=== Starwing ===
(Starwing Co/American Aviation Corp, Massillon OH.)

- Starwing G-4

=== Stástik ===
(Jan Stástik / J. Stástik & Co.)

- Stástik Dreadnaught

=== Statler ===
(William H Statler, Northridge CA.)

- Statler Dos Equis Challenger
- Statler Firefly

=== State Aircraft Factory (Greece) ===
see KEA

=== States ===
(States Aircraft Co, 1633 Wentworth Ave, Chicago Heights IL.)

- States B-2
- States B-3 (a.k.a. S-E-5)
- States B-4

=== Stauffer ===
(O L Stauffer, Elkhart IN.)

- Stauffer Gyroplane

=== Stavatti Aerospace ===
(Stavatti Aerospace Ltd)

- Stavatti SM-66
- Stavatti SM-920
- Stavatti SM-100
- Stavatti SM-150
- Stavatti SM-26 Sleek
- Stavatti SM-27 Machete
- Stavatti SM-31 Stiletto
- Stavatti SM-36 Stalma
- Stavatti SM-39 Razor
- Stavatti SM-47 Super Machete

=== STC ===
(Societata de Transport Constanța)

- STC R.A.S.-1 Getta – designer Radu Stoika

=== Stearman ===
(Stearman Aircraft Div, United Aircraft Corp, Wichita.)

- Stearman 4
- Stearman 6
- Stearman X-70
- Stearman 73
- Stearman 75
- Stearman 76
- Stearman 80
- Stearman 81
- Stearman X-85
- Stearman X-90
- Stearman X-91
- Stearman C1
- Stearman C2
- Stearman C3
- Stearman CAB-1 Coach
- Stearman LT-1
- Stearman Cloudboy
- Stearman Kaydet
- Stearman Senior Speedmail
- Stearman Junior Speedmail
- Stearman Special
- Stearman Sporstster
- Stearman M-2 Speedmail
- Stearman BT-3
- Stearman BT-5
- Stearman PT-9
- Stearman XPT-943
- Stearman PT-13
- Stearman PT-17
- Stearman PT-18 (Boeing-Stearman)
- Stearman NS
- Stearman N2S
- Stearman OSS
- Stearman-Hammond JH-1
- Stearman-Hammond Y-1M (Y-125)
- Stearman-Hammond Y-1S (Y-150)

=== Stearman ===
(SStearman-Jensen Aircraft Co / Stearman Aviation Incorporated)

- Stearman B-2

=== Stearman-Varney ===
( (Lloyd) Stearman-(Walter) Varney Inc, San Francisco Bay Airdrome, Alameda CA.)

- Stearman-Varney Sport

=== Stebbins-Geynet ===
()

- Stebbins-Geynet Model A
- Stebbins-Geynet Model B

=== Steco ===
((James S & Ralph C) Stephens Engineering Co, Chicago IL)

- Stephens Aerohydroplane

=== Stedman ===
(Charles T Stedman et al., South Bend IN.)

- Stedman 1929 Biplane
- Stedman 1930 Biplane

=== Steglau ===
(Ivan Ivanovich Steglav)

- Steglav 1912 biplane
- Steglav No.2 biplane

=== Steen ===
((Lamar) Steen Aero Lab Inc, Brighton CO.)

- Steen Skybolt
- Steen Super Skybolt
- Steen Steenship 1

=== Steere ===
(John Steere)

- Steere Bodacious

=== Steir ===
(Steir Aviators Union of Graz, Austria)

- Steir Austria (regn. A-21)

=== Steffan ===
(Frank Steffan, Los Angeles CA.)

- Steffan Re-inforced Biplane

=== Stellar Aircraft ===
(Bloomfield, Indiana, United States)

- Stellar Astra

=== Stelmaszyk ===
(Władysław Stelmasyk)

- Stelmaszyk S.1 Bozena

=== Stemme ===
(Stemme GmbH)

- Stemme S2 – unpowered glider, 2 seater
- Stemme S6 – touring motorglider
- Stemme S7 – unpowered glider, 2 seater
- Stemme S8 – touring motorglider
- Stemme S10 – Self Launching motorglider and original aircraft
- Stemme S12
- Stemme S15 -Prototype UAV based on S6
- Stemme TG-11A
- Stemme ASP S15

=== Stepanich ===
(Rudolph & Anna Stepanich, Rosedale NY.)

- Stepanich 1930 aeroplane
- Stepanich Center-Wing

=== Stephens ===
(Clayton L Stephens, San Bernardino CA.)

- Stephens Akro
- Stephens Akro Laser Z-200

=== Stephens & Fisher ===
(Roy Fisher & Glen Stephens, 2600 Onieda St, Denver CO.)

- Stephens & Fisher Scamp 36

=== Stepnic (aircraft constructor) ===
- Stepnic 1929 Monoplane

=== Stern ===
(Rene Stern, France)

- Stern ST 80 Balade
- Stern ST-85
- Stern ST 87 Vega

=== Steve Wright (aircraft constructor) ===
- Steve Wright Stagger-Ez

=== Stevens ===
(B Stevens & Sons, Woonsocket RI.)

- Stevens 1911 Monoplane
- Stevens 1915 Biplane

=== Stevenson ===
(Gary L Stevenson, Spenard AK.)

- Stevenson Windstreak

=== Steward-Davis ===
(Steward-Davis Inc (founders: Herb Steward, Stanley Davis), Compton Airport CA. )

- Steward-Davis Jet-Packet 1600
- Steward-Davis Jet-Packet 3200
- Steward-Davis Jet-Packet 3400
- Steward-Davis Jet-Packet II
- Steward-Davis Jet-Pak C-119
- Steward-Davis Skytruck I
- Steward-Davis Skypallet
- Steward-Davis Stolmaster
- Steward-Davis Super Catalina
- Steward-Davis "Val"

=== Stewart ===
((Robert W) Stewart Aerial Vehicle Co)

- Stewart 1910 parafoil
- Stewart 1911 Biplane

=== W.F. Stewart Company ===
(Flint, Michigan, United States)

- Stewart M-1
- Stewart M-2

=== Stewart ===
(C M Stewart, Loyal OK.)

- Stewart Model 1

=== Stewart ===
(Charles L Stewart, Tulsa OK.)

- Stewart B

=== Stewart ===
(Walter E Stewart, Stewart Field, Tyler TX.)

- Stewart Texas Bluebird

=== Stewart ===
(Stewart Aircraft Corp, Menominee MI.)

- Stewart Headwind
- Stewart Foo Fighter

=== Stewart ===
(Donald M. Stewart)

- Stewart 265

=== Stewart ===
(Ed Stewart, Paso Robles CA.)

- Stewart Swifty#2

=== Stewart ===
(Jim D. Stewart)

- Stewart Colibri

=== Stewart 51 ===
(Vero Beach, Florida, United States)

- Stewart S-51D Mustang

=== Stierlin ===
- Stierlin Helicopter

=== Stiles ===
(Stiles Aircraft, Sycamore IL. 1928: 538 S Dearborn St, Chicago IL.)

- Stiles Dragon Fly

=== Stinson ===
(Stinson Aircraft Corp, Northville MI)

- Stinson AT-19
- Stinson C-81 Reliant
- Stinson C-91
- Stinson CQ-2
- Stinson L-1 Vigilant
- Stinson L-5 Sentinel
- Stinson L-9
- Stinson L-12 Reliant
- Stinson L-13
- Stinson O-49 Vigilant
- Stinson O-54
- Stinson O-62 Sentinel
- Stinson OY
- Stinson R3Q
- Stinson RQ
- Stinson QR
- Stinson U-19 Sentinel
- Stinson SB-1 Detroiter
- Stinson SM-1 Detroiter
- Stinson SM-2
- Stinson SM-3
- Stinson SM-4 Junior
- Stinson SM-5
- Stinson SM-6 Detroiter
- Stinson SM-7 Junior
- Stinson SM-8 Junior
- Stinson SM-9
- Stinson SM-6000
- Stinson SR Reliant
- Stinson 10 Voyager
- Stinson 74
- Stinson 75
- Stinson 76 Sentinel
- Stinson 77
- Stinson 105 Voyager
- Stinson 108
- Stinson Amphibian
- Stinson Detroiter
- Stinson HW-75
- Stinson HW-80
- Stinson HW-90
- Stinson Junior
- Stinson Model A amphibian (twin parasol amphibian)
- Stinson Model A trimotor (low wing airliner)
- Stinson Model L
- Stinson Model M
- Stinson Model O
- Stinson Model R
- Stinson Model S Junior
- Stinson Model T
- Stinson Model U
- Stinson Model W
- Stinson Reliant
- Stinson Voyager
- Stinson Wasp
- Stinson-Faucett F-19
- Stinson Greyhound

=== Stipa ===
- Stipa-Caproni

=== Stits ===
(Ray Stits, Battle Creek MI)

- Stits SA-1A Junior
- Stits SA-2A Sky Baby
- Stits SA-3 Playboy
- Stits SA-4A Executive
- Stits-Besler Executive
- Stits SA-5 Flut-R-Bug
- Stits SA-6 Flut-R-Bug
- Stits SA-7 Sky-Coupe
- Stits SA-8A Skeeto
- Stits SA-9A Sky-Coupe
- Stits SA-11A Playmate
- Stits DS-1 Baby Bird

=== Stockwell ===
(Erwin Stockwell)

- Stockwell flying Corvair

=== Stoddard-Hamilton ===
(Stoddard-(Tom) Hamilton Aircraft Inc, Arlington WA)

- Glasair I
- Glasair II
- Glasair III
- Glasair Glastar
- Glasair Turbine 250
- Glasair SH
- Glasair Arocet AT-9 Stalker

=== Stoeckel ===
- Stoeckel Monoplane

=== Stoelk ===
(William E Stoelk, Manning IA & Wendel G Hacker, Templeton IA.)

- Stoelk 1930 Monoplane (a.k.a. Hacker monoplane)

=== Stolp ===
(Stolp Starduster Corp (Louis A Stolp & George M Adams), Compton CA.)

- Stolp SA-100 Starduster
- Stolp SA-101 Super Starduster
- Stolp SA-300 Starduster Too
- Stolp SA-500 Starlet
- Stolp SA-700 Acroduster I
- Stolp SA-750 Acroduster Too
- Stolp SA-900 V-Star

=== Stone ===
(Stone & Fry, Park City MT.)

- Stone S-2

=== Stone ===
(Edward R Stone, Wichita KS.)

- Stone B-2

=== Storey ===
(Tom Storey)

- Storey TSR.3 Wonderplane

=== Storey Thomas ===
- Storey Thomas #2 Special

=== Storm ===
(Storm Aircraft Srl, Saubadia, Italy)

- Storm Century
- Storm Rally
- Storm RG Fury
- Storm 280
- Storm 300
- Storm 320E
- Storm Sea Storm

=== Storms ===
((N E) Storms Aircraft Co, Asheville NC. 1929: Spartanburg Aviation Co, Spartanburg SC.)

- Storms Flying Flivver

=== Stossel ===
(W J Stossel, Palm Beach FL.)

- Stossel A-1

=== Stout ===
(Stout Metal Airplane Div, Ford Motor Co.)

- Stout 1-AS Air Sedan
- Stout 2-AT Air Pullman
- Stout 3-AT
- Stout Batwing
- Stout Batwing Limousine
- Stout Bushmaster 2000
- Stout Cootie
- Stout Skycar I
- Stout Skycar II
- Stout Skycar III
- Stout Skycar IV
- Stout C-65
- Stout C-107
- Stout ST-1
- Stout SV-1
- Stout TT
- Stout Dragonfly amphibian

=== Stralpes Aéro ===
(Stralpes Aéro SARL)

- Stralpes Aéro ST-11M Minimus

=== Strandgren ===
- Strandgren Cyclogiro

=== Strat (aircraft constructor) ===
- Strat 1949 Monoplane

=== Stratolaunch Systems ===
- Stratolaunch carrier aircraft

=== Stratos Aircraft ===
(Redmond, Oregon, United States)

- Stratos 714

=== Straughn ===
((Frank) Straughn Aircraft Corp, Wichita KS.)

- Straughn A
- Straughn B

=== Straughn-Holmes ===
- Straughn-Holmes A

=== Streamline Welding ===
(Hamilton, Ontario, Canada)

- Ultimate 10-180
- Ultimate 10-200
- Ultimate 10-300

=== Strickland ===
((C Kenneth) Strickland Aircraft Corp, High Point NC.)

- Strickland 1948 Monoplane

=== Striplin Aircraft ===
(Jim Striplin)

- Striplin FLAC
- Striplin Lone Ranger
- Striplin Sky Ranger
- Striplin Silver Cloud
- Striplin Silver Cloud II

=== Strojnik ===
(Dr. Alex and Cirila Strojnik)

- Strojnik S-4 Laminar Magic

=== Strom-Olesen ===
(Carl Strom & Oscar Olesen, Mineola NY.)

- Strom-Olesen Monoplane

=== Stroop ===
(Robert C Stroop, Rome GA, Jacksonville AL.)

- Stroop Scout
- Stroop SP-4
- Stroop SP-7

=== Stroukoff ===
( (Michael) Stroukoff Aircraft Corp, Trenton NJ.)

- Stroukoff YC-123E Provider
- Stroukoff YC-134 (YC-123D)
- Stroukoff YC-134A Pantobase
- Stroukoff YC-134 Pantobase

=== Stupar ===
(Chicago Aero Works (pres: H S Renton), 345 River St, Cicero IL.)

- Stupar 1914 Biplane#1
- Stupar 1914 Biplane#2

=== Sturtevant ===
Sturtevant Aeroplane Co (pres: Noble Foss, vp/gen mgr: Grover C Loening, div of Sturtevant Mfg Co, Jamaica Plain, Massachusetts)

- Sturtevant A(A-1) Tractor
- Sturtevant A(A-2) Seaplane
- Sturtevant A (A-3) Battleplane
- Sturtevant B-1 Speed Scout
- Sturtevant B-2 Pursuit
- Sturtevant P-L Tractor
- Sturtevant S-2 Trainer
- Sturtevant S-3
- Sturtevant S-4 Seaplane
- Sturtevant S-4 Tractor
- Sturtevant School Hydroaeroplane
- Sturtevant Steel Trainer
- Sturtevant Trainer
