= Staib =

Staib may refer to:

== People ==
- Christian Staib (1892–1956), Norwegian Olympic sailor
- Constantin Staib (born 1995), German field hockey player
- David Paul Staib, Jr., American NASA Astronaut
- Elizabeth Staib, Miss Alaska USA, 1976
- Margaret Staib (born 1962), former CEO of Airservices Australia and a former senior officer in the Royal Australian Air Force.
- Walter Staib, German-American chef, proprietor of City Tavern, and host of A Taste of History on PBS
- Wilbur Staib (1914-1993), self-taught designer of a series of small aircraft including the Staib LB-1, Staib LB-2, Staib LB-4 and the Staib Helicopter.
