= Steere =

Steere may refer to:

- Steere (surname)
- Mount Steere, a shield volcano in Antarctica
- Steere River, in Western Australia
- Steere Bodacious, an American single seat aircraft
