= SH2 =

SH2 may stand for:

- SH2 (classification), a Paralympic shooting classification
- SH2 domain (Src Homology 2), a protein domain within the Src oncoprotein
- SH-2 Seasprite, an American-built ship-based helicopter
- SH-2, an iteration of the SuperH CPU core developed by Hitachi
- Sh2, the second edition of the Sharpless catalog
- Shavrov Sh-2 (Ш-2), a Soviet flying boat
- State Highway 2, see List of highways numbered 2
