= Headwind (disambiguation) =

Headwind is a wind that blows against the direction of travel.

Headwind may also refer to:

- Stewart Headwind, a homebuilt aircraft
- "Headwind" (song), from the 2019 album You Deserve Love by White Reaper
- Headwinds, a 2011 French film
- A component of a crosswind
