= Starck AS-27 Starcky =

AS-27 Starcky

General information
- Type: Single seat racer
- National origin: France
- Designer: André Starck
- Number built: 1

History
- First flight: Summer 1975
- Developed from: Starck AS-20

The Starck AS-27 Starcky was a racing single seat biplane of unusual wing layout with full stagger and a small gap. It was designed and built in France in the 1970s; only one was made.

== Design and development ==
André Starck had built the Starck AS-20, a biplane with heavy stagger and small gap, in 1942, guided by the pre-World War II studies of Miroslav Nenadovitch. Conventional biplanes have interplane gaps significantly greater than their wing chord to minimise the usually deleterious inter-wing interactions; Nenadovitch sought to take advantage of the interaction to produce a wing pair that acted rather like a single, monoplane wing with slotted flaps. The AS-27 followed the same plan but introduced wing tip end-plates or "curtains" bearing the ailerons, used again in the later AS-37.

The AS-27 was an all-wood aircraft with Finnish ply covering. The upper wings were attached to the fuselage at shoulder wing position and the lower ones to the lower fuselage, leaving a gap of about 400 mm (16 in). The stagger placed the trailing edge of the upper wing above the lower wing's leading edge. The upper plane had a longer span and wider chord than the lower one. There were no traditional interplane struts; instead, the wing tips were joined by "curtains", approximately parallelogram-shaped airfoil structures the width of the lower wing. Because of the span difference, these leaned outwards at 45°, allowing them to carry ailerons on their trailing edges. In addition, it was claimed, these provided the lateral stability more usually secured with dihedral as well as producing additional lift.

The fuselage and empennage of the AS-27 were conventional, with its cockpit over the lower wing. Its fixed conventional undercarriage had arched leaf spring cantilever main legs with cable bracing, together with a steerable tailwheel. It had a 78 kW (105 hp) Potez 4E flat four engine in its long nose, closely cowled with prominent bulges enclosing the cylinder heads. There were two fuel tanks, one ahead and one aft of the cockpit.

The AS-27 was built by Claude Chevassut and his son. It made its first flight in the summer of 1975, piloted by Robert Buisson at Chavenay.

== Specifications ==
Data from Flight 3 January 1976 p.30-1

General characteristics

- Crew: 1
- Length: 5.33 m (17 ft 6 in)
- Wingspan: 4.70 m (15 ft 5 in)
- Wing area: 6.90 m^{2} (74.3 sq ft)
- Airfoil: NACA 63015
- Fuel capacity: 84 L (18.5 Imp gal; 22 US gal)
- Powerplant: 1 × Potez 4E air-cooled flat four, 78 kW (105 hp)
- Propellers: 2-bladed

Performance

- Range: 1,000 km (620 mi, 540 nmi)
