= St. Louis Cardinal =

St. Louis Cardinal may refer to:

- a member of the St. Louis Cardinals
- St. Louis C2 Cardinal, a series of monoplanes built by the St. Louis Aircraft Corporation
