= Historic Aircraft Restoration Museum =

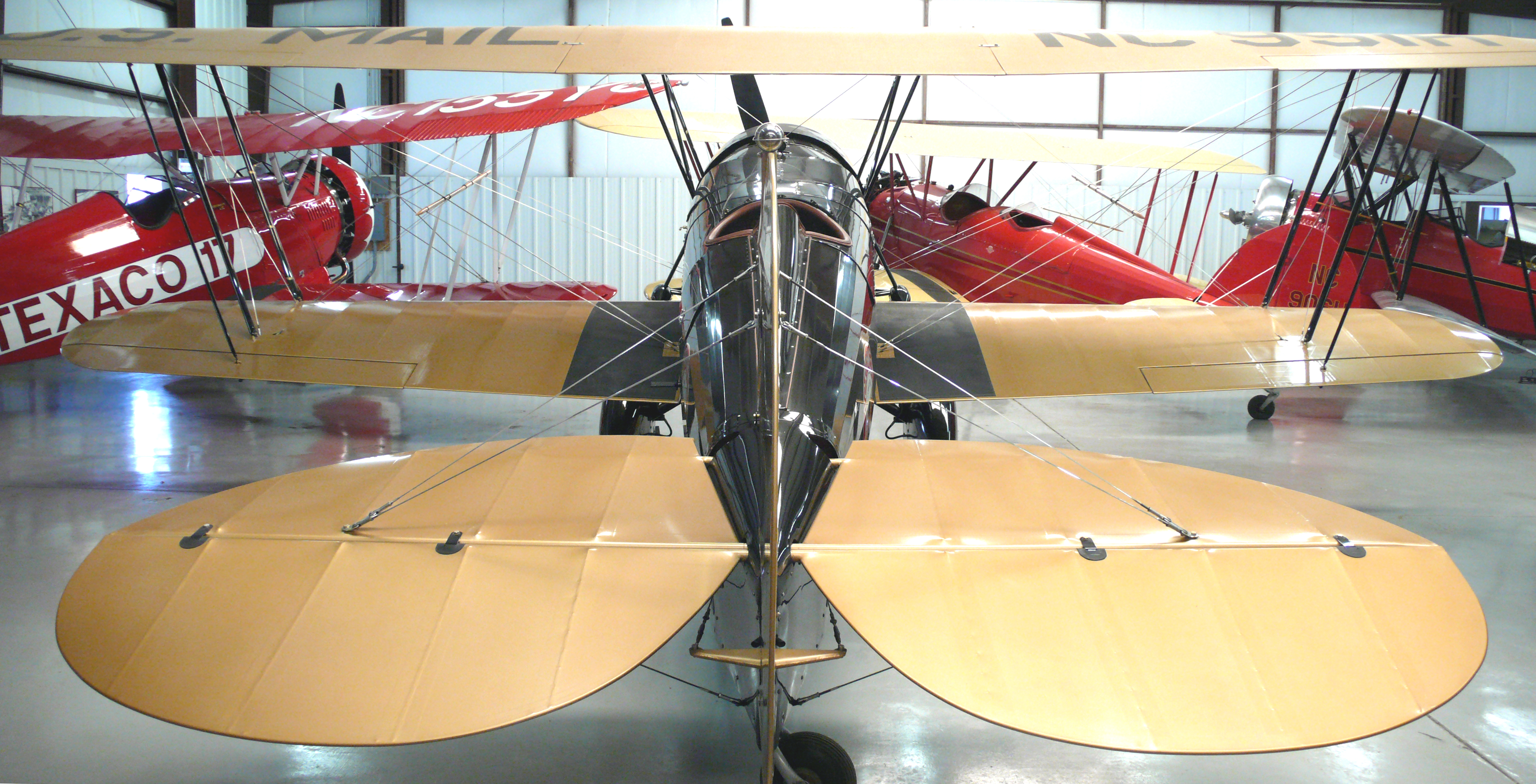

- Location within Missouri
- Location: Maryland Heights, Missouri
- Coordinates: 38.724241°N 90.506306°W
- Type: Aviation museum
- Website: historicaircraftrestorationmuseum.org

The Historic Aircraft Restoration Museum, located at Creve Coeur Airport in Maryland Heights, Missouri, United States, is dedicated to restoring and preserving historical aircraft. The airplanes in the collection are all fabric-covered, and most are biplanes from the inter-war years (the "Golden age of flight"). The museum's volunteers maintain most of these aircraft in full working order.

== History ==
The Historic Aircraft Restoration Society and Museum had been established by mid August 1988.

The museum was inundated by the 1993 Missouri River Flood, damaging an Sh-2 that was under restoration.

By October 2025, Albert Stix IV had taken over as museum director.

== Collection ==
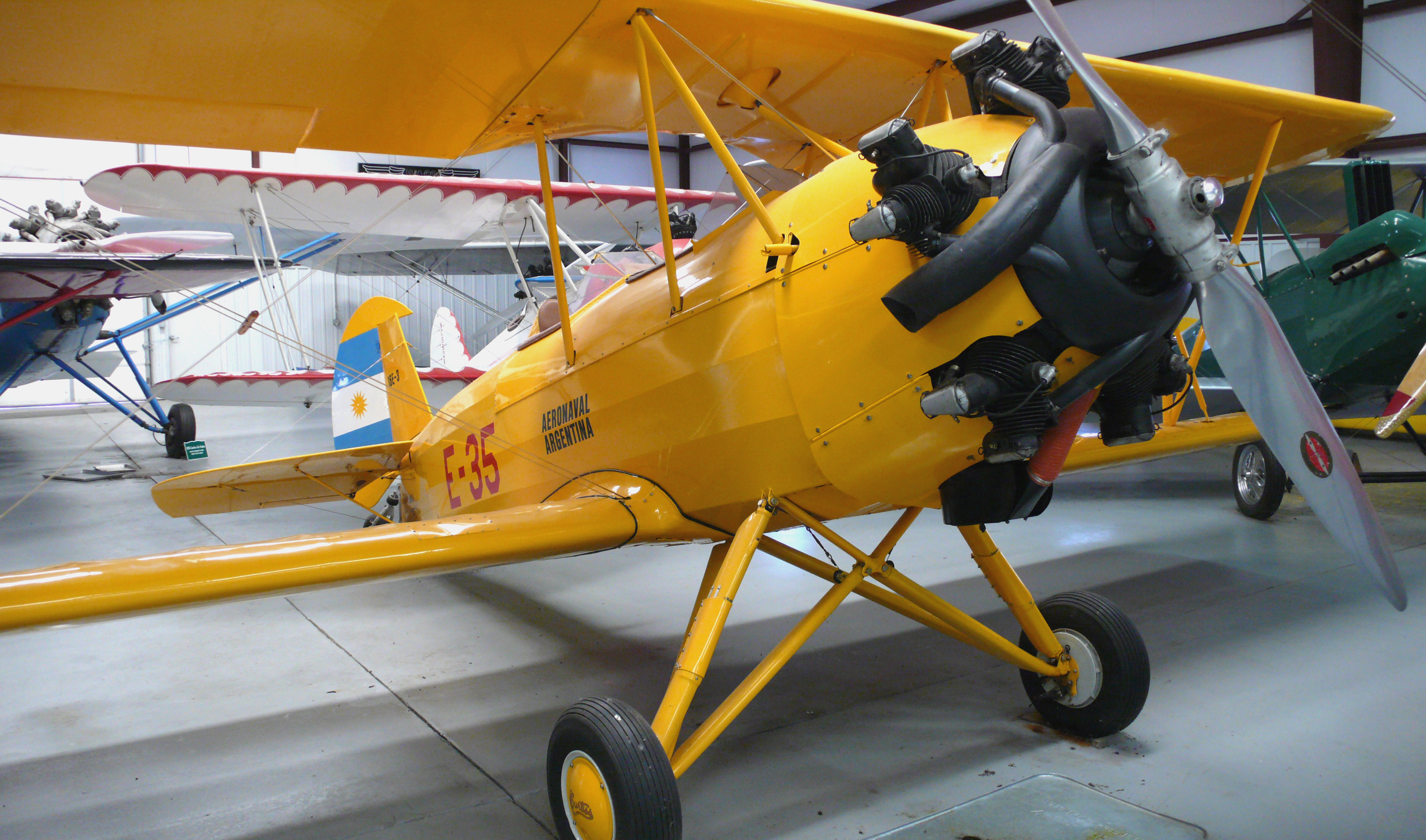
Curtiss Travel Air 16E

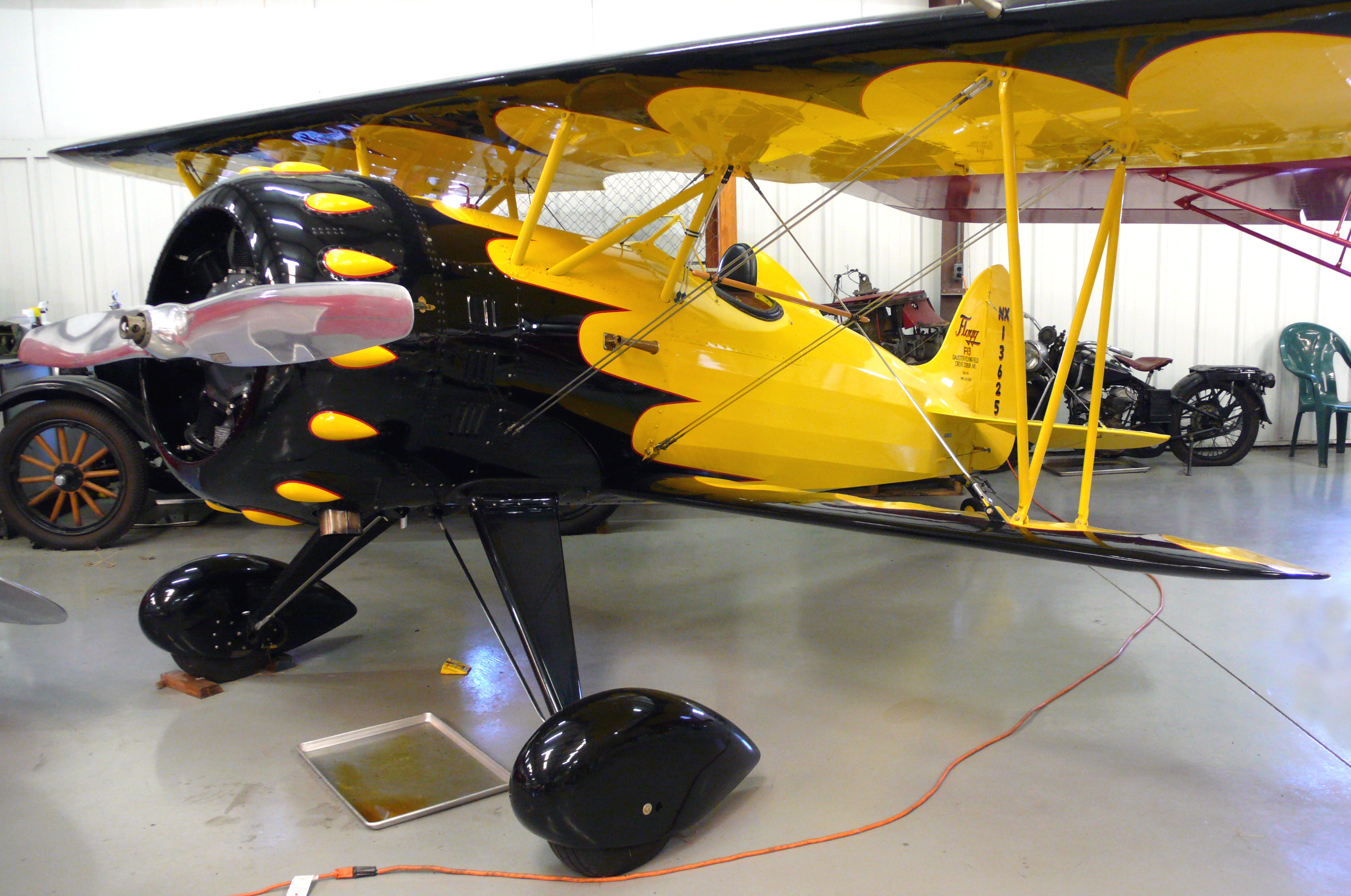
Flagg F-13

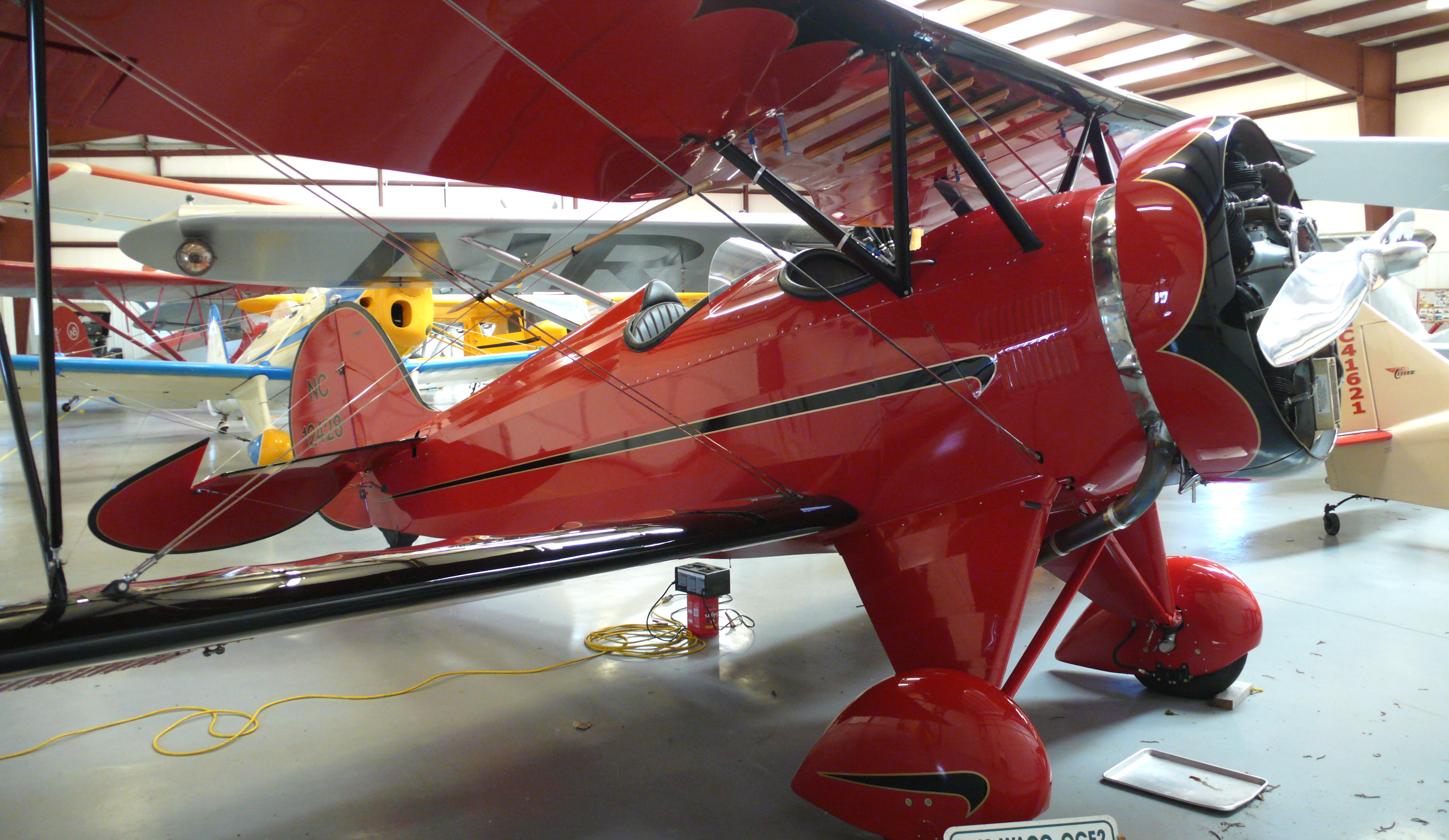
Waco QF-2

The museum collection concentrates on civil aircraft from the inter-war years, with most of the aircraft originating from 1916 to 1946. There are several Waco biplanes, with the oldest of these types being a WACO 10, which was built in 1928. The oldest airplane on display is a Standard J-1 that was built in 1917 and was used in the movies The Rocketeer and The Great Waldo Pepper.

Several of the preserved aircraft are the only surviving airworthy examples of their type.

=== Aircraft on display ===
- Aeronca K
- Atlantic DH-4M-2A
- Antonov An-2
- Antonov An-2
- Canadian JN-4C Canuck
- Culver Cadet LCA
- Curtiss-Robertson Robin
- Curtiss-Wright 16E-3 Light Sport
- Curtiss-Wright CW-1 Junior – replica
- Curtiss-Wright CW-15C Sedan
- de Havilland DH.89A Dragon Rapide
- Driggs Dart II
- Fairchild 24 C8A
- Fairchild 71
- Fairchild KR-21B
- Fairchild KR-31
- Flagg F.13
- Fleet Fawn
- Funk B-85-C Bee
- Laister-Kauffman LK-10A
- Meyers MAC-145
- Mono Monosport 2
- Monocoupe D-145
- Monocoupe Model 90-A8
- Monocoupe Model 90L
- Monocoupe 110
- Nicholas-Beazley NB-8G
- Pietenpol Air Camper
- Piper PA-11 Cub Special
- Piper PA-15 Vagabond
- Rearwin Sportster
- Rutan Long-EZ
- Ryan M-1 – replica
- Ryan ST-3KR
- SAI KZ III
- Shavrov Sh-2
- Sopwith Pup – replica
- St. Louis Cardinal
- Standard J-1
- Star Cavalier A
- Star Cavalier E
- Stinson SR-6 Reliant
- Stinson SM-8A Junior
- Taylor E-2 Cub
- Timm Collegiate
- Travel Air 2000
- Travel Air 3000
- Waco ATO
- Waco ATO
- Waco AVN-8
- Waco Cootie – replica
- Waco CSO
- Waco CTO
- Waco GXE
- Waco JWM
- Waco QCF-2
- Waco QCF-2
- Waco RNF
- Waco UBF-2
- Waco YKC
- Waco YKS-7
- Yakovlev Yak-52
- Yakovlev Yak-52
- Zenith Z-6-A

== Programs ==
Aircraft rides are available at the museum by request, in either a de Havilland DH82 Tiger Moth or in a North American SNJ-5.

== See also ==
- Shuttleworth Collection
