= Stampe et Vertongen RSV.26 =

RSV 26/140, 26/180, and 26 Lynx
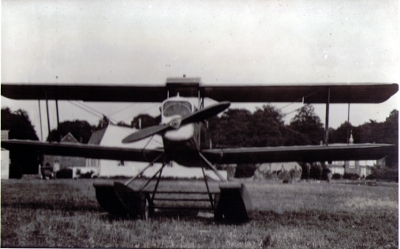
- RSV.26/180 amphibian

General information
- Type: military trainer aircraft
- National origin: Belgium
- Manufacturer: Stampe et Vertongen
- Designer: Alfred Renard
- Primary user: Belgian Air Force
- Number built: between 17 and 98

History
- First flight: 1926
- Developed from: Stampe et Vertongen RSV.32

The Stampe et Vertongen RSV.26/140, RSV.26/180, and RSV.26 Lynx were a family of training biplanes designed by Alfred Renard and built by Stampe et Vertongen in Belgium in the 1920s. They were produced as a response to a requirement by the Belgian Air Force, which became their biggest user, although private owners also bought a small number.

== Design and development ==
The air force requirement was for a two-seat aircraft with aerobatic capabilities that could provide a next stage for students who had completed basic training on the RSV.32. Stampe et Vertongen contracted Alfred Renard to provide a design, and for the sake of expediency, suggested that he submit a revision of his RSV.32 rather than create an entirely new aircraft. The resulting RSV.26 was, like its predecessor, a conventional single-bay biplane with unstaggered wings of equal span. However, the fuselage was reinforced to accommodate engines of up to 150 kW (200 hp), the undercarriage legs were fitted with thicker bungee cords, and the pilot's and instructor's seats were now placed in two separate cockpits in tandem. The RSV.26 had wings of smaller span and area than the RSV.32, that were, despite appearances, a complete redesign of the older wing. The shorter span allowed the use of a more powerful engine and provided greater speed and maneuverability while not adversely affecting rate of climb. Power was provided by a 100-kW (140-hp) Minerva engine in the nose, driving a two-bladed propeller. The prototype made its public début on 26 June 1926 at a rally at Ostend.

The air force evaluated the type and judged it suitable. However, the new Minerva engines cost 50,000 BEF while the government could purchase war-surplus Hispano-Suiza engines from France for only 6,500 BEF. Consequently, Stampe et Vertongen was asked to adapt the design to the alternative powerplant. The firm was reluctant to accommodate the change, as the Hispano-Suiza engines and cooling systems were heavier than their Minerva counterparts, and had not only obsolete technology but were already used and worn-out. Nevertheless, the contract was too valuable to refuse, and Renard altered the design accordingly. The biggest change was to move the upper wing forward, staggering it with the lower wing to preserve the aircraft's centre of gravity. The change also provided improved access to and visibility from the forward cockpit. The air force purchased the RSV.26 in this form, now designated RSV.26/180 to reflect its more powerful engine. In service, it was known as the RSV décalé or 26 décalé ("staggered" in French).

The start of the RSV.26/180's career was troubled by a handling problem that made three-point landings almost impossible. The cause was traced back to the factory: an error in making the templates for the wing ribs resulted in all the wings having the wrong profile. Stampe et Vertongen rectified this at the firm's own expense. Other problems with the type were due to the second-hand engines, which suffered continual mechanical breakdowns and by the early 1930s had contributed to a long list of accidents. To investigate a solution to the ongoing situation, the air force returned the RSV.26/140 prototype to the factory to be fitted with an Armstrong Siddeley Lynx engine. When the resulting modification proved successful, the air force had ten of its RSV.26/180s re-engined the same way. With the new engines fitted, they were redesignated RSV.26/215 or RSV.26 Lynx. Following their military careers, ten RSV.26/180s were sold to private owners in 1936.

Histories of Stampe et Vertongen differ on the number of RSV.26/140s and RSV.26/180s produced, with figures as disparate as 17 and 98 published.

== Variants ==
RSV 26/140
variant with a 100-kW (140-hp) Minerva engine (depending on the source, either one built or 29 built)
RSV 26/180
variant with a 130-kW (180-hp) Hispano-Suiza engine (depending on the source, any of: 16 built, ten for the air force and six for private owners; or 26 built, 20 for the air force and six for private owners; or up to 43 built, up to 38 for the air force and five for private owners.) One RSV.26/180, civil registration O-BADE, was converted to an amphibious floatplane for a time.
RSV 26/215 or RSV 26 Lynx
variant with a 160-kW (215-hp) Armstrong Siddeley Lynx (depending on the source, either one converted from the RSV.26/140 and ten converted from RSV.26/180s or ten built)

== Operators ==
Belgium

- Belgian Air Force

== Specifications (RSV 26/180) ==
Data from de Maeyer 1980, p.5

General characteristics

- Crew: two
- Length: 7.15 m (23 ft 5 in)
- Wingspan: 9.38 m (30 ft 9 in)
- Wing area: 26 m^{2} (280 sq ft)
- Empty weight: 540 kg (1,190 lb)
- Gross weight: 821 kg (1,810 lb)
- Powerplant: 1 × Hispano , 134 kW (180 hp)

Performance

- Maximum speed: 182 km/h (113 mph, 98 kn)
- Service ceiling: 7,500 m (24,600 ft)

== See also ==
Related lists

- List of Interwar military aircraft
