= Stewart Foo Fighter =

General information
- Type: Homebuilt aircraft
- National origin: United States
- Manufacturer: Stewart Aircraft Corporation
- Designer: Don Stewart

History
- Introduction date: 1970
- First flight: 1967

The Stewart Foo Fighter JD2FF is a single-seat biplane homebuilt aircraft design that emulates fighter aircraft of World War I.

== Design and development ==
The Foo Fighter was developed using similar construction features as the Stewart Headwind. The fuselage is welded steel tubing with fabric covering. The lower wing design is unusual, passing below the fuselage rather than attaching to it on either side. The first aircraft built used a Ford Falcon 200 CID engine that proved to be too heavy. A Franklin 130 hp engine was used next, but the engine went out of production. The final design was changed to accommodate a Lycoming O-235 or O-320 engine.

== Operational history ==
The Foo Fighter was demonstrated for over 30 hours during the one-week Experimental Aircraft Association Convention in Oshkosh, Wisconsin, In 1972.

== Specifications (Stewart Foo Fighter) ==
Data from http://www.stewartaircraft.com/main.html

General characteristics

- Crew: one
- Length: 18 ft 9 in (5.72 m)
- Wingspan: 20 ft 8 in (6.30 m)
- Height: 7 ft (2.1 m)
- Empty weight: 720 lb (327 kg)
- Gross weight: 1,100 lb (499 kg)
- Fuel capacity: 19 U.S. gallons (72 L; 16 imp gal)
- Powerplant: 1 × Lycoming O-235 piston aircraft engine

Performance

- Maximum speed: 126 kn (145 mph, 233 km/h)
- Cruise speed: 117 kn (135 mph, 217 km/h)
- Stall speed: 45 kn (52 mph, 83 km/h)
- Range: 300 nmi (345 mi, 555 km)
- Rate of climb: 1,200 ft/min (6.1 m/s)

== See also ==
Aircraft of comparable role, configuration, and era

- Circa Reproductions Nieuport
