= Starck AS-57 =

AS-57
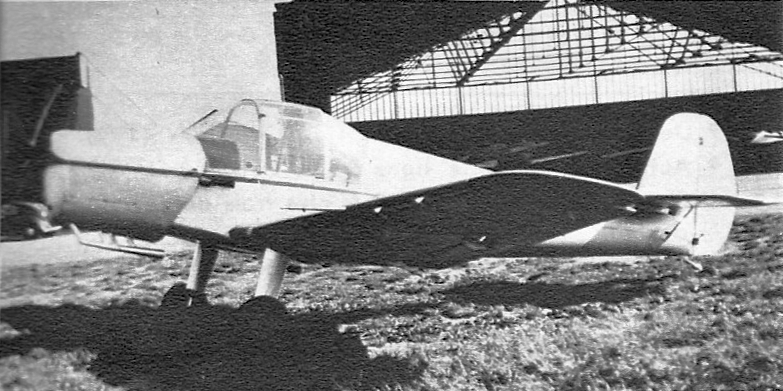

General information
- Type: Two seat light aircraft
- National origin: France
- Manufacturer: Avions André Starck
- Designer: André Starck
- Number built: 10

History
- First flight: 4 April 1946

The Starck AS-57 is a single engine low wing monoplane seating two in side-by-side configuration. It was designed and built in France just after World War II; only ten were produced, one of which was still active in 2012.

== Design and development ==
Like the earlier Starck A.S. 70 Jac single seat light aircraft, the AS-57 was an all wooden machine. The two types were similar in layout, apart from the accommodation, though the AS-57 was larger all round. The wings were straight tapered in plan, with rounded tips. The earliest AS-57 had full span trailing edge control surfaces which could be lowered as flaps and operated differentially at the same time as ailerons, though one later specimen at least had ailerons outboard and separate flaps inboard. Leading edge slots are fitted. The side-by-side configuration seating is enclosed under a bubble canopy which has transparent access panels. At the rear the canopy line drops to the upper fuselage to improve the pilot's view aft. The fuselage tapers back to the tail unit, where the tailplane is mounted just above the upper fuselage surface, braced from below with a pair of struts and placed well forward of the straight leading edge of the fin. The fin has a curved top which merges into a full, rounded rudder.

The AS-57 has a fixed conventional undercarriage; some have had wheel fairings, others not. There is a small tailwheel. Various engines have been fitted; the one remaining active aircraft has a 78 kW (105 hp) Walter Minor 4-III but another had a Regnier 67 kW (90 hp) 4E.0, both four cylinder, inverted, air-cooled inlines.

The AS-57 flew for the first time on 4 April 1946.

== Operational history ==
An AS-57 was on view at the 1949 Paris Salon. The general later verdict on the AS-57 was that its appearance was pleasing and its characteristics "honest", but its performance unexceptional.

In 2010 only one AS-57, powered by a Walter Minor engine, remained on the French civil aircraft register. Another AS-57 is at the Musée Régional de l'Air at Angers, viewable though not on public display.

== Specifications (Walter Minor engine) ==
Data from Airlife's World Aircraft, Jane's all the World's Aircraft 1947

General characteristics

- Crew: One
- Capacity: One passenger
- Length: 6.45 m (21 ft 2 in)
- Wingspan: 8.8 m (28 ft 10 in)
- Height: 1.85 m (6 ft 1 in)
- Wing area: 11 m^{2} (120 sq ft)
- Empty weight: 310 kg (683 lb)
- Gross weight: 600 kg (1,323 lb)
- Fuel capacity: 80 L (21 US gal; 18 imp gal) fuel; 10 L (2.6 US gal; 2.2 imp gal) oil
- Powerplant: 1 × Walter Minor 4-III 4-cylinder inverted air-cooled inline engine, 78 kW (105 hp)
- Propellers: 2-bladed fixed pitch propeller

Performance

- Maximum speed: 201 km/h (125 mph, 109 kn)
- Cruise speed: 185 km/h (115 mph, 100 kn)
- Range: 792 km (492 mi, 428 nmi)
- Rate of climb: 3.55 m/s (699 ft/min)
- Wing loading: 54.5 kg/m^{2} (11.2 lb/sq ft)
- Power/mass: 10.7 kg/kW (17.6 lb/hp) (with 56 kW (75 hp) engine)
