= Starck AS-80 Holiday =

AS-80 Holiday
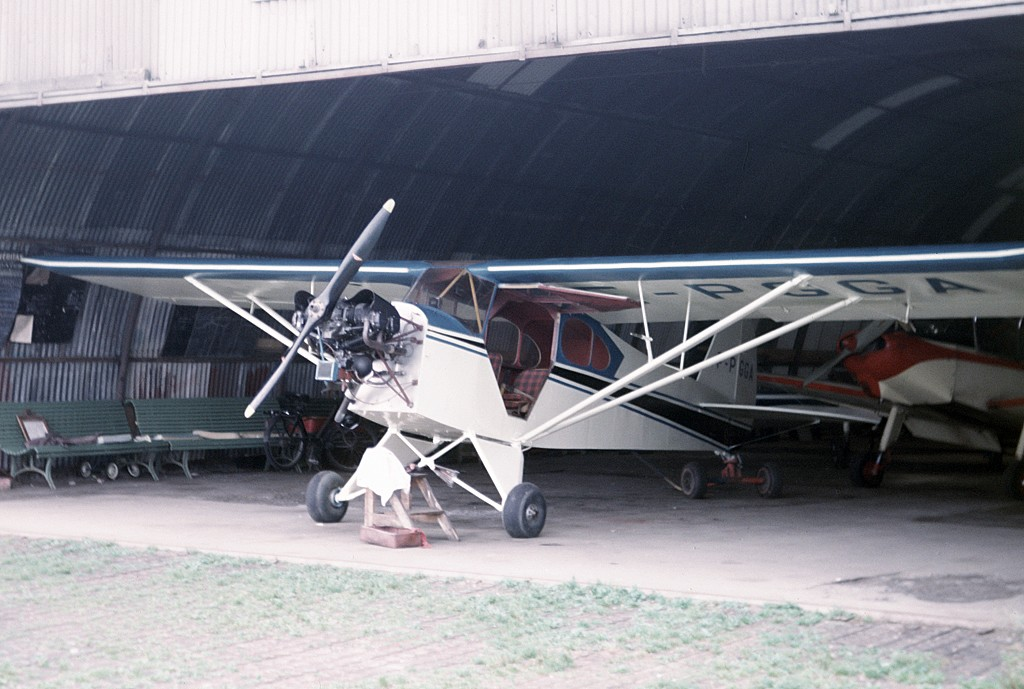
- AS.80 Holiday (Lavadoux) F-PGGA at Guyancourt airfield near Paris in 1965

General information
- Type: Two seat light aircraft
- National origin: France
- Manufacturer: Avions André Starck
- Designer: André Starck
- Number built: at least 6

History
- First flight: 1947

The Starck AS-80 Holiday is a conventional two-seat, single-engine high-wing monoplane designed and built in France around 1950. It was sold in kit form but only a few were completed.

== Design and development ==
The Holiday is wood framed and fabric covered throughout. Its high wing, built around two spars, has constant chord and rounded tips. It is braced to the lower fuselage longerons with two V-form pairs of struts, assisted by jury struts. The tail unit is braced, with the tailplane set at mid-fuselage height. The fin is straight edged, the rudder generous, rounded and fitted with a trim tab.

The rectangular cross-section fuselage is deep behind the cabin, its upper surface at wing height. The cabin is under the wing with the windscreen at the leading edge and its glazing extending rearwards beyond the trailing edge. Access is via trapezoidal side doors. The conventional fixed undercarriage has mainwheels with low pressure tyes on faired V-struts and half axles hinged on an underside cabane. The main unit is rubber sprung; the tail skid is spring steel. Some Holidays have had wheel fairings, others not.

The prototype Holiday first flew powered by a 56 kW (75 hp) Régnier 4D.2 four cylinder inverted inline air-cooled piston engine, but there was a wide range of suitable engines, both inline and flat fours, in the power range 44-63 kW (59-85 hp). The second prototype, for example, had a 48 kW (65 hp) Continental A 65 flat four. Though the inline Régnier engine was fully cowled, some of the flat fours have had exposed cylinder heads.

== Operational history ==
At least seven Holidays have appeared on the French civil register. In 2010 four remained; one French-built Holiday is now (2012) on the UK register. Some of those currently registered may not be active. Several of the Holidays first flew around 1950 but at least one was not completed until 1998. In France, the type was usually referred to as the AS.80 Lavadoux.

== Specifications (Régnier engine) ==
Data from Jane's All the World's Aircraft 1953-54

General characteristics

- Capacity: 2
- Length: 6.60 m (21 ft 8 in)
- Wingspan: 10.0 m (32 ft 10 in)
- Height: 1.90 m (6 ft 3 in)
- Wing area: 15.50 m^{2} (166.8 sq ft)
- Empty weight: 327 kg (721 lb)
- Gross weight: 550 kg (1,213 lb)
- Powerplant: 1 × Régnier 4D.2 four cylinder inverted inline air-cooled, 56 kW (75 hp)
- Propellers: 2-bladed

Performance

- Maximum speed: 158 km/h (98 mph, 85 kn)
- Cruise speed: 142 km/h (88 mph, 77 kn)
- Range: 315 km (196 mi, 170 nmi)
- Service ceiling: 5,600 m (18,400 ft)
- Landing speed: 66 km/h (41 mph; 36 kn)
