= Starck AS.90 New Look =

1950s French aircraft

AS.90 New Look

General information
- Type: Sports aircraft
- National origin: France
- Designer: André Starck
- Number built: 2

History
- First flight: 11 June 1950

The Starck AS.90 New Look was a sports aircraft built in France in the early 1950s.

== Design and development ==
The AS.90 New Look was a mid-wing monoplane of all-wood construction, for engines of 15–30 hp (11–22 kW).

== Variants ==
AS.90-01
Powered by an 18 hp (13 kW) Aubier-Dunne V.2D; first flown on 11 June 1950.
AS.90-02
(F-PGGB), powered by a 27 hp (20 kW) Ava 4A-00; first flown on 19 November 1955 and destroyed in an accident on 31 July 1960.
AS.90 Super New look
A redesign of the AS.90 in the early 1980s, with a new wing section and slightly increased dimensions, powered by contemporary low-powered aircraft engines, such as the Citroën Ami 6 conversion delivering 35 hp (26 kW).

== Specifications (AS-90.01) ==
Data from

General characteristics

- Crew: 1
- Length: 5.35 m (17 ft 7 in)
- Wingspan: 7.40 m (24 ft 3 in)
- Wing area: 9.40 m^{2} (101.2 sq ft)
- Empty weight: 120 kg (265 lb)
- Gross weight: 210 kg (463 lb)
- Powerplant: 1 × Aubier-Dunne V.2D piston engine, 13 kW (18 hp)
- Propellers: 2-bladed

Performance

- Maximum speed: 90 km/h (56 mph, 49 kn)
- Range: 200 km (120 mi, 110 nmi)
- Service ceiling: 3,000 m (9,800 ft)
