= Stierlin =

Stierlin is a surname. Notable people with the surname include:

- Gustav Stierlin (1821–1907), Swiss physician and entomologist
- Helm Stierlin (1926–2021), German psychiatrist, psychoanalyst, and systemic family therapist
- Henri Stierlin (1928–2022), Swiss journalist and writer
- Niclas Stierlin (born 2000), German footballer
