= Stiles Dragon Fly =

Dragon Fly

General information
- Type: two seat civil parasol wing monoplane
- National origin: United States
- Manufacturer: Stiles Aircraft
- Designer: Russel C. Mossman
- Number built: at least three

History
- First flight: late 1927-early 1928

The Stiles Dragon Fly was an American two seat monoplane aircraft of the late 1920s. It was aimed at private and club owners. Significant production was planned but few were built.

== Design and development ==
The Dragon Fly was marketed as a mid price, easy maintenance two-seater for the private owner and for general club activities including training. It was a parasol wing aircraft with a two spar, fabric covered wing of rectangular plan out to rounded tips. Its ailerons filled the span. Faired, V-form struts joined the wing from its spars to the lower fuselage members on each side and the centre section was held on vertical, longitudinal, inverted-V cabane struts between the upper fuselage and the spars on both sides. The advantages of the absence of rigging wires, both for maintenance and passenger access, were stressed in its publicity.

The Dragon Fly's Detroit Air Cat five cylinder, 60–80 hp (45–60 kW) radial was mounted in the nose with its cylinders exposed for cooling. Its cowling was quickly removable for maintenance and a firewall separated the engine from the rest of the fabric covered fuselage, which was structurally rectangular in cross-section though it had a curved upper decking. Its two open cockpits were placed quite far apart, with the forward one under the wing occupied by a passenger or student. Access was via a large door. The pilot or instructor's cockpit was well behind the trailing edge with a deep wing cut-out to further improve the upward field of view. At the rear a trapezoidal tailplane was mounted on top of the fuselage and carried blunt-tipped elevators. The fin was very small but carried a large, rounded, balanced rudder.

Its 7 ft (2.1 m) track landing gear was fixed and conventional, with a tailskid at the rear. Its main wheels were on a split axle centrally hinged to the fuselage underside. The splayed undercarriage legs and forward drag struts were mounted on the lower fuselage longerons.

Its first flight date is not known, but had not yet occurred by the preparation date of a brief article that appeared in Aero Digest's December 1927 edition. The first delivery was made by February 1928 to an Altoona company for use as a sales demonstrator. It was also scheduled to receive the next example, as Stiles Aircraft geared up for production. It is not known how many were built; at least three aircraft were registered in the US, two with Anzani engines and one, a Dragon Fly NAF-1 – manufactured by Dragon Fly Aircraft in 1929 – with a Velie M-5, an engine very similar to the Air Cat.

== Specifications ==
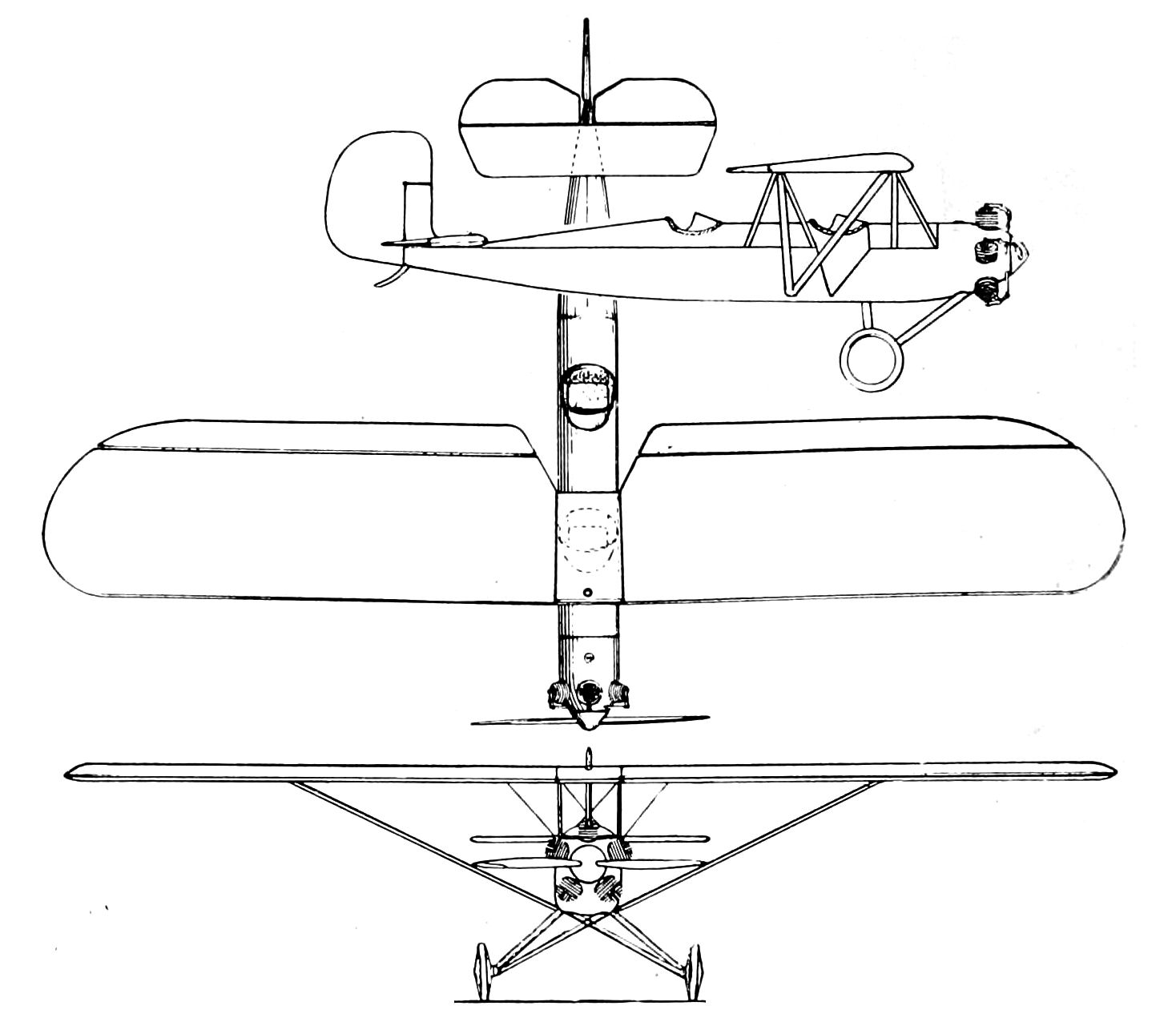

Data from Aero Digest (November 1927) Performance data are pre-flight estimates with 5% uncertainties.

General characteristics

- Crew: one
- Capacity: one passenger
- Length: 23 ft 11 in (7.29 m)
- Wingspan: 36 ft (11 m)
- Height: 8 ft 1 in (2.46 m)
- Empty weight: 850 lb (386 kg)
- Gross weight: 1,367 lb (620 kg)
- Fuel capacity: 20 US gal (17 imp gal; 76 L) in centre section plus 2.5 US gal (2.1 imp gal; 9.5 L) in auxiliary tank.
- Powerplant: 1 × Detroit Air Cat 5-cylinder radial, 60–80 hp (45–60 kW)
- Propellers: 2-bladed Hartzell

Performance

- Maximum speed: 105 mph (169 km/h, 91 kn)
- Cruise speed: 85 mph (137 km/h, 74 kn) at 1,000 ft (300 m)
- Range: 450 mi (720 km, 390 nmi)
- Rate of climb: 800 ft/min (4.1 m/s) initial
- Landing speed: 38 mph (61 km/h; 33 kn)
- Landing roll: 260 ft (79 m)
- Take-off distance: 180 ft (55 m)
