= Staib LB-2 =

LB-2

General information
- Type: Homebuilt aircraft
- National origin: United States
- Designer: Wilbur Staib

The Staib LB-2, also called the Little Bastard, Little Bit and The Monster, is a homebuilt aircraft design of Wilbur Staib. It once held the title as the "worlds smallest monoplane".

== Design and development ==
Wilbur Staib (1914-1993) was a self-taught aircraft designer from Diamond, Missouri. Staib served as a flight instructor during the Second World War at Chanute, Kansas flying PT-14s. Staib designed and built five different "LB" (Little Bastard) aircraft and a helicopter, of which several had the title "world's smallest" at their time of construction. Staib flew his aircraft in airshows with the title "The Diamond Wizard".

The LB-2 is a single engine low-wing, open cockpit monoplane with conventional landing gear. LB-2 was the considered the "World's Smallest Monoplane" when built to take the title from Ray Stits 8 ft (2.4 m) span aircraft. The wing section was adapted from a Piper Cub airfoil.

== Operational history ==
The LB-2 was flown at near top speed, with stalls untested. The roll rate was good, but turns were difficult. Landing speed was 120 mph (193 km/h). The fuselage was disassembled in 1953 to build the Staib LB-3 biplane.

The LB-3 used new 14 ft (4.3 m) span wings made in the same fashion as Staib's LB-1 with brazed steel spring wing ribs with Taylorcraft airfoil sections. The aircraft cruised at 125 mph (201 km/h) and operated on the airshow circuit for two years. Cliff Baker operated the aircraft one more season, suffering a broken back after a high-speed incident.

== Variants ==
Staib LB-3
Biplane built from fuselage of the LB-2
Staib LB-5
"Little Bit" Volkswagen powered variant. One on display at the Mid-America Air Museum.

== Specifications (Staib LB-1) ==
Data from Air Trails

General characteristics

- Crew: 1
- Length: 11 ft (3.4 m)
- Wingspan: 7 ft 6 in (2.29 m)
- Wing area: 31 sq ft (2.9 m^{2})
- Airfoil: Clark Y
- Empty weight: 390 lb (177 kg)
- Fuel capacity: 5 U.S. gallons (19 L; 4.2 imp gal)
- Powerplant: 1 × Continental C-85 horizontally opposed piston aircraft engine

Performance

- Maximum speed: 140 kn (160 mph, 260 km/h)
- Cruise speed: 130 kn (150 mph, 240 km/h)
- Stall speed: 100 kn (120 mph, 190 km/h) est.
- Endurance: 1 h
