= Striplin FLAC =

American ultralight aircraft

FLAC

General information
- Type: Ultralight aircraft
- National origin: United States
- Designer: Ken Striplin
- Status: Production completed

History
- First flight: October 1978
- Variant: Striplin Lone Ranger

The Striplin FLAC (Foot Launched Air Cycle) is an American flying wing ultralight aircraft that was designed by Ken Striplin in 1977, first flying in October 1978. The aircraft was supplied as a kit for amateur construction.

== Design and development ==
The aircraft preceded the US FAR 103 Ultralight Vehicles rules, but fits into the category, including FAR 103's maximum empty weight of 254 lb (115 kg). The aircraft has a standard empty weight of 200 lb (91 kg). It features a cantilever high-wing, a single-seat, partially enclosed cockpit, tricycle landing gear and twin 11.5 hp (9 kW) Soarmaster engines powering a single propeller in pusher configuration. Twin go-cart engines have also been employed.

The aircraft is made from aluminum tubing, foam, fiberglass, with the wings finished in doped aircraft fabric covering. Its 32 ft (9.8 m) span wing features a laminar-flow airfoil, 50%-span elevons and wing tip rudders that can both be deployed simultaneously for use as air brakes. The aircraft has a 22:1 glide ratio. The FLAC has laminated fiberglass main landing gear legs and a nose wheel that is steerable. The aircraft was also designed to be at least nominally foot-launchable to comply with the informal US requirements for ultralights of that period that they be able to do so. Foot launching was carried out by opening a hinged door in the fuselage floor.

In flight the aircraft has been described as unstable, particularly in pitch and at least one accident was attributed to its instability.

== Specifications (FLAC) ==
Data from Cliche

General characteristics

- Crew: one
- Wingspan: 32 ft 0 in (9.75 m)
- Wing area: 155 sq ft (14.4 m^{2})
- Empty weight: 200 lb (91 kg)
- Gross weight: 434 lb (197 kg)
- Fuel capacity: 5 U.S. gallons (19 L; 4.2 imp gal)
- Powerplant: 2 × Soarmaster single cylinder, two-stroke, 11.5 hp (8.6 kW) each

Performance

- Maximum speed: 65 mph (105 km/h, 56 kn)
- Cruise speed: 55 mph (89 km/h, 48 kn)
- Stall speed: 16 mph (26 km/h, 14 kn)
- Never exceed speed: 80 mph (130 km/h, 70 kn)
- Maximum glide ratio: 22:1 at 36 mph (53 km/h)
- Rate of climb: 300 ft/min (1.5 m/s)
- Rate of sink: 105 ft/min (0.53 m/s)
- Wing loading: 2.8 lb/sq ft (14 kg/m^{2})
