= Star Flight Starfire =

Starfire

General information
- Type: Ultralight aircraft
- National origin: United States
- Manufacturer: Star Flight Manufacturing
- Designer: Dick Turner
- Status: Production completed

History
- Introduction date: 1979

The Star Flight Starfire is the first aircraft in a large family of American ultralight aircraft that was designed by Dick Turner and produced by Star Flight Manufacturing, introduced in 1979. The aircraft were all supplied as kits for amateur construction.

== Design and development ==
The aircraft was designed before the US FAR 103 Ultralight Vehicles rules were brought into effect, but all models comply with them anyway, including the category's maximum empty weight of 254 lb (115 kg). The Tristar, for instance, has a standard empty weight of 220 lb (100 kg). The line of aircraft all feature a cable-braced high-wing, a single-seat, open cockpit, tricycle landing gear and a single engine in pusher configuration.

The aircraft is made from bolted-together aluminium tubing, with the flying surfaces covered in Dacron sailcloth. Its 33 ft (10.1 m) span wing is cable-braced from a single element kingpost. The landing gear features a steerable nose wheel with a bicycle-style rim brake. The powerplant is mounted underneath the wing and drives a pusher propeller.

The Tristar model took 25 hours to build from the factory-supplied assembly kit.

== Variants ==
Starfire
Initial model with a hybrid weight-shift and aerodynamic control system, designed in 1979.
Tristar
Model designed in 1980, with a conventional three-axis aerodynamic control system, using a side stick and spoilers for roll control. Revised fuselage for new control system. The standard engine supplied was the 30 hp (22 kW) Cuyuna 430R.
TX-1000
Model with a conventional three-axis aerodynamic control system, strengthened airframe and a 35 hp (26 kW) Rotax 377 two-stroke engine.
SC-1000
Improved model
AC-2000
Improved model introduced in 1984.

== Specifications (Tristar) ==
Data from Cliche and the Virtual Ultralight Museum

General characteristics

- Crew: one
- Length: 15 ft (4.6 m)
- Wingspan: 33 ft (10 m)
- Height: 9 ft (2.7 m)
- Wing area: 165 sq ft (15.3 m^{2})
- Empty weight: 220 lb (100 kg)
- Gross weight: 470 lb (213 kg)
- Fuel capacity: 2.5 U.S. gallons (9.5 L; 2.1 imp gal)
- Powerplant: 1 × Cuyuna 430R twin cylinder, two-stroke aircraft engine, with reduction drive, 30 hp (22 kW)

Performance

- Maximum speed: 55 mph (89 km/h, 48 kn)
- Cruise speed: 38 mph (61 km/h, 33 kn)
- Stall speed: 21 mph (34 km/h, 18 kn)
- Range: 60 mi (97 km, 52 nmi)
- Service ceiling: 10,000 ft (3,000 m)
- g limits: +5/-3
- Maximum glide ratio: 7:1
- Rate of climb: 750 ft/min (3.8 m/s)
- Rate of sink: 350 ft/min (1.8 m/s)
