= Striplin Lone Ranger =

Family of American ultralight aircraft designed by Ken Striplin

Lone Ranger

General information
- Type: Ultralight aircraft
- National origin: United States
- Designer: Ken Striplin
- Status: Production completed

History
- Developed from: Striplin FLAC

The Striplin Lone Ranger is a family of American ultralight aircraft that was designed by Ken Striplin. The aircraft was supplied as a kit for amateur construction.

== Design and development ==
The aircraft was designed to comply with the US FAR 103 Ultralight Vehicles rules, including the category's maximum empty weight of 254 lb (115 kg). The aircraft has a standard empty weight of 245 lb (111 kg). It features a high-wing, a single-seat, open cockpit, tricycle landing gear and a single engine in tractor configuration.

The Lone Ranger was designed to overcome pitch stability problems found in the earlier Striplin FLAC tailless aircraft. Stability was increased with the addition of a conventional tail unit, including conventional elevators and a rudder for control. Because they were no longer needed the FLAC's wing tip rudders were deleted. The landing gear is of tricycle configuration and features a steerable nosewheel. The engine is mounted above the wing, with the propeller above and in front of the windshield. The design spawned a family of variants featuring one and two seats, as well as strut-braced and cantilever wings.

== Variants ==
Striplin Lone Ranger
Initial version for US production. Early versions have dual wing struts, while later models have just one strut. Engines used include the Zenoah G-25B of 20 hp (15 kW) and the Yamaha KT-100S of 15 hp (11 kW).
Aero and Engineering Services Lone Ranger
Cantilever wing version produced by Aero and Engineering Services of the United Kingdom. The wing was redesigned and has a span of 34 ft (10.4 m). The engine used is the Zenoah G-25B of 20 hp (15 kW). Empty weight 210 lb (95 kg), gross weight 420 lb (191 kg), glide ratio of 17:1.
Silver Cloud
Improved version with a cantilever wing and full-span flaperons. Engines used include the Cuyuna 215R of 20 hp (15 kW).
Sky Ranger
Two seat version of the Lone Ranger.
Silver Cloud II
Two seat version of the Silver Cloud.

== Specifications (Silver Cloud) ==
Data from Cliche

General characteristics

- Crew: one
- Wingspan: 32 ft (9.8 m)
- Wing area: 120 sq ft (11 m^{2})
- Empty weight: 245 lb (111 kg)
- Gross weight: 500 lb (227 kg)
- Fuel capacity: 5 U.S. gallons (19 L; 4.2 imp gal)
- Powerplant: 1 × Cuyuna 215R single-cylinder, fan-cooled, two-stroke, single ignition, aircraft engine with 2.1:1 reduction gearing, 20 hp (15 kW)

Performance

- Maximum speed: 63 mph (101 km/h, 55 kn)
- Stall speed: 25 mph (40 km/h, 22 kn)
- g limits: +6/-4
- Rate of climb: 600 ft/min (3.0 m/s)
- Wing loading: 4.17 lb/sq ft (20.4 kg/m^{2})
