= Star Cavalier =

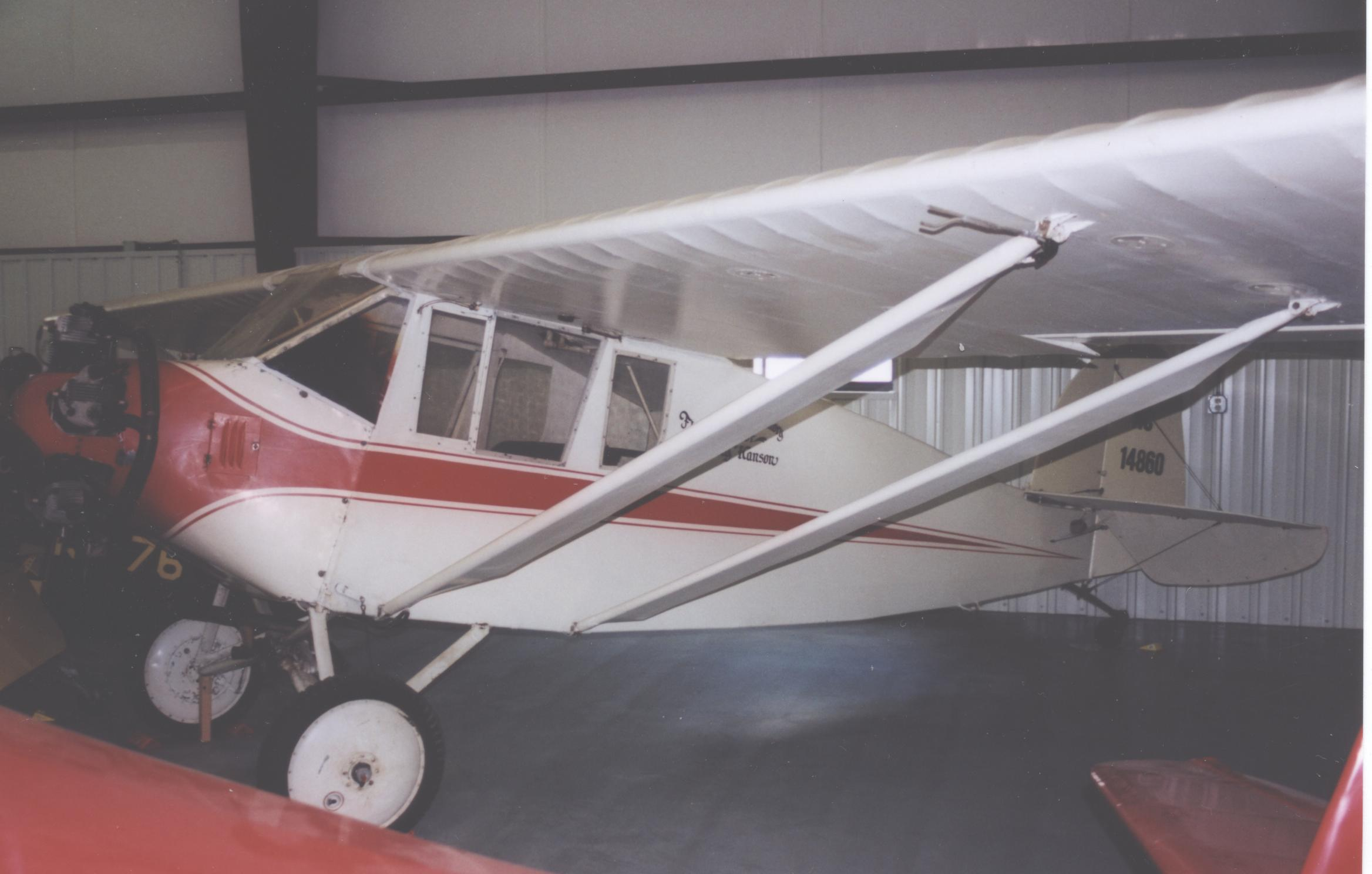
- Cavalier B displayed airworthy at the Historic Aircraft Restoration Museum in June 2006.

General information
- Type: private owner light aircraft
- National origin: United States
- Manufacturer: Star Aircraft
- Designer: E.A.Riggs and W.Parker
- Status: some examples still airworthy
- Primary user: private owners
- Number built: 34

History
- Introduction date: 1928

The Star Cavalier was an American two-seat high-wing light aircraft first introduced in the late 1920s.

== Development ==
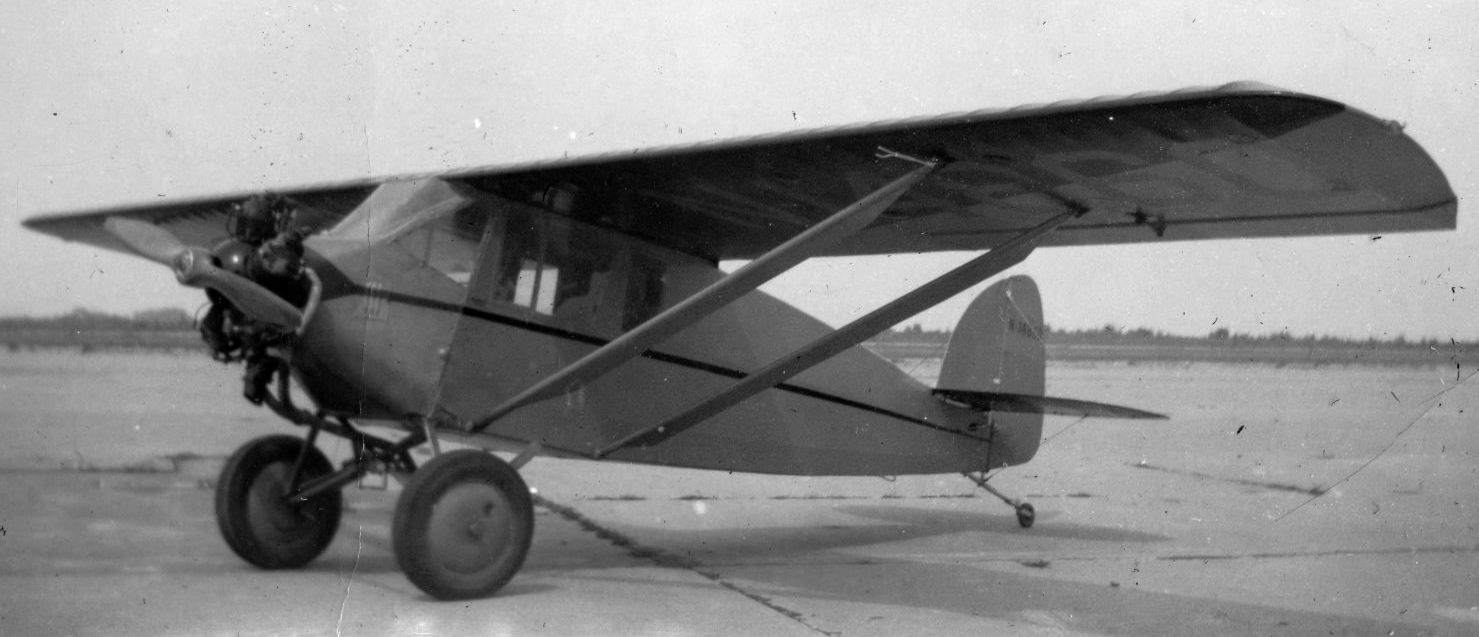
Star Cavalier

The Star Aircraft division of Phillips Petroleum was formed at Bartlesville, Oklahoma in 1928. Designers E.A.Riggs and W.Parker prepared plans for a two-passenger high-wing light private owner aircraft intended for the lower cost end of the market. The advertised cost was $3,450. Three Cavalier A planes were delivered in 1928.

The Cavalier B followed in 1929 fitted with a lower powered 55 hp Velie M-5 engine and 15 examples were sold at $2,895 to owners of more modest means. Single examples of the Cavalier C and D followed. The next to secure modest success was the Cavalier E of 1930 which had a 90 h.p. Lambert and was fitted with a taller, more angular, tail fin. 13 were sold. The last of the Cavalier series was the single F model.

== Operational history ==
The various Cavalier models served private owners in the touring role until the curtailment of civil flying in the US in late 1941. Five Cavaliers remained on the U.S. civil aircraft register as of 2009. Cavalier B N14860 of 1930 is on public display, in airworthy condition, at the Historic Aircraft Restoration Museum at Dauster Field, Creve Coeur, Missouri near St Louis.

== Variants ==
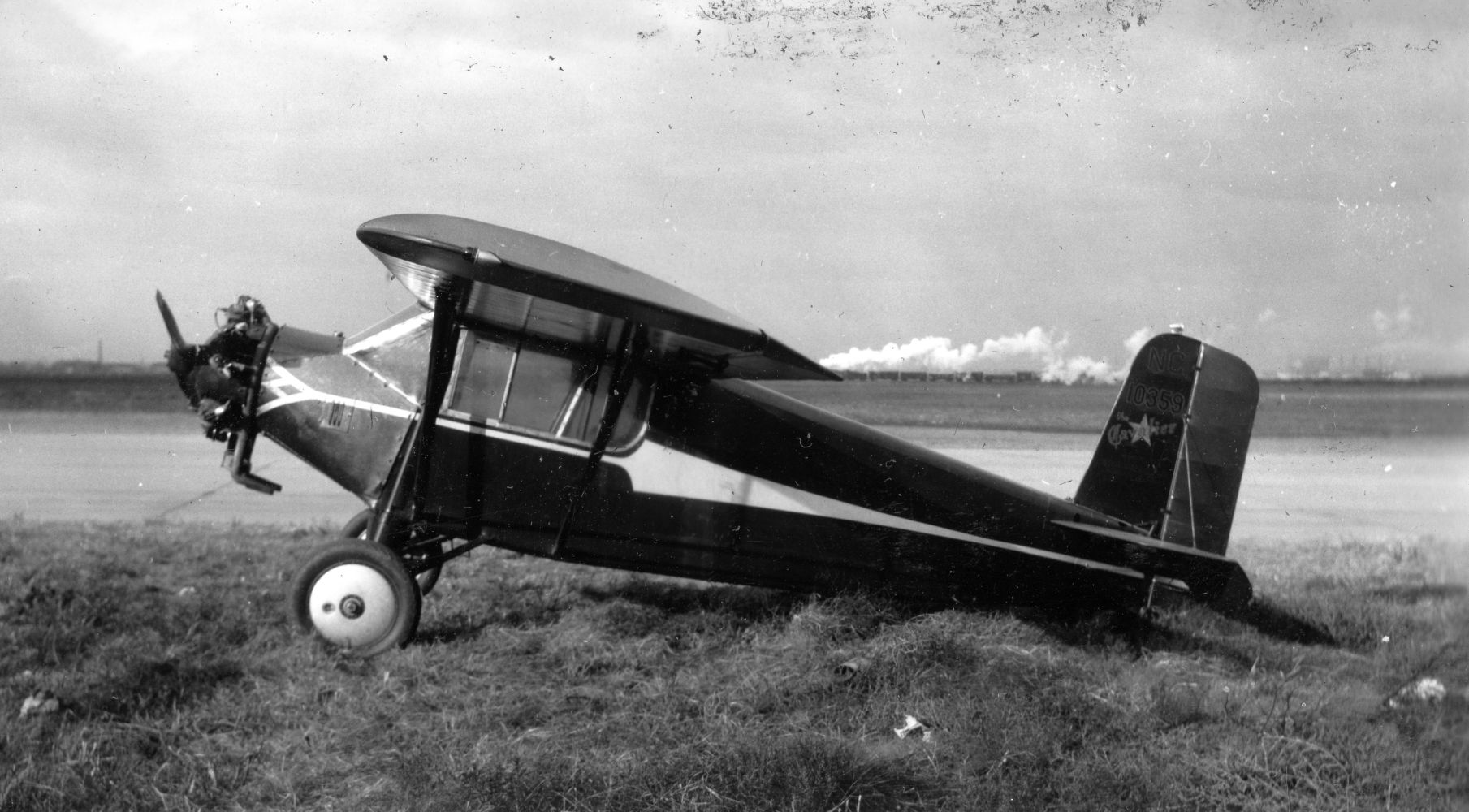
Star Cavalier E

(source - Aerofiles)

Cavalier A
1928. 90 hp (67 kW) Lambert R-266 5 cylinder radial.
Cavalier B
1929/30. 55 hp (41 kW) Velie M-5. Some had an 80 hp (60 kW) Armstrong Siddeley Genet or 90 hp (67 kW) Lambert R-266.
Cavalier C
1929. 60 hp (45 kW) LeBlond 5D 5 cylinder radial.
Cavalier D
1929. 60 hp (45 kW) LeBlond.
Cavalier E
1930. 90 hp (67 kW) Lambert R-266 and taller more angular fin.
Cavalier F
1930. Warner Junior

== Specifications (Cavalier B) ==
Data from Aerofiles and The Incomplete Guide to Airfoil Usage

General characteristics

- Crew: 1
- Capacity: 1 passenger
- Length: 19 ft 11 in (6.07 m)
- Wingspan: 31 ft 6 in (9.60 m)
- Airfoil: Clark Y
- Useful lift: 538 lb (244 kg)
- Powerplant: 1 × Velie M-5 , 55 hp (41 kW)

Performance

- Maximum speed: 100 mph (161 km/h, 87 kn)
- Cruise speed: 85 mph (137 km/h, 74 kn)
- Stall speed: 40 mph (64 km/h, 35 kn)
- Range: 500 mi (800 km, 430 nmi)
