= Steere (surname) =

Steere is an English surname and it may refer to:

- Allen Steere (late 20th/early 21st c.), American professor of rheumatology
- Arthur Steere (1865–1943), American politician and businessman
- Dick Steere (rugby union) (1908–1967), New Zealand rugby union player
- Douglas V. Steere (1901–1995), American Quaker ecumenist
- Edward Steere (1828–1882), English bishop in Zanzibar and linguist
- Gene Steere (1872–1942), American baseball player
- Henry J. Steere (1830–1889), American philanthropist and industrialist
- Joseph Beal Steere (1842–1940), American ornithologist
- Joseph H. Steere (1852–1936), American jurist
- Madeleine Steere (born 1996), Australian water polo player
- Richard Steere (author) (1643–1721), American merchant and poet
- Richard Steere (fencer) (1909–2001), American olympic fencer
- Robert Steere (1833–1910), American pioneer
- William C. Steere, Jr., chief executive officer of Pfizer
- William C. Steere (1907–1989), American botanist
- William Steere (priest) (died 1638), Irish Anglican priest

== See also ==
- Lee Steere (surname)
