= Starck AS-37 =

AS-37

General information
- Type: Two seat single engine biplane
- National origin: France
- Designer: André Starck
- Number built: 3

History
- First flight: 13 January 1977

The Starck AS-37 is a two-seat biplane with unconventional wing and propulsion layouts. It was designed in France in the 1970s; though three were built and more than twenty sets of plans sold for home building, no AS-37s are active in 2012.

== Design and development ==
The AS-37 is conventionally constructed from wood, with a spruce structure covered with acajou plywood. The small gap, high stagger wing arrangement first proposed by Nenadovitch is the aircraft's most unusual feature, though one that its designer André Starck had used in two of his earlier aircraft, the AS-20 from 1942 and the AS-27 from the early 1970s. The wings have low aspect ratios; the upper one is mounted on the fuselage a little above mid-position and the lower at the bottom of the fuselage, making the gap unusually small. The stagger is sufficient to place the upper trailing edge a little ahead of the lower leading edge. Together, the two wings were intended to have some of the desirable characteristics of a single, slotted wing. The AS-37 has wings of unequal span and chord, the lower one smaller, joined not by conventional interplane struts but by wing tip "curtains". These aerodynamic surfaces, as broad in chord as the lower wings, lean outwards at 45° with ailerons attached to their trailing edges. As well as stiffening the wing structure, these curtains were said to improve lateral control and stall behaviour.

The earlier AS-27 was powered by a conventionally nose-mounted engine but, though the AS-37 is also single engined, it originally had two propellers in pusher configuration, one on each upper wing. The propellers turned in the narrow gap between the two wings, with the intention that the propeller slipstream should enhance the slot effect of the wing pair. The propellers were timing belt driven, with a gear reduction of 2:1, by a 49 kW (65 hp) Citroën GS 1220 engine placed near mid-fuselage, behind the cabin.

The fuselage of the AS-37 is deep and flat sided. The constant chord tailplane, placed on top of the fuselage, and the fin, which has a straight, swept leading edge, both carry balanced control surfaces. The cabin is forward of the upper wing, enclosed by a single curvature canopy which follows the straight sloping nose. Dual controls are provided for the side-by-side seating. The AS-37 had a fixed tricycle undercarriage with the mainwheels on side V-struts and half-axles and the wheels have disc brakes.

The first AS-37 first flew in this form, later referred to as the AS-37A, on 15 January 1977 and by October it had logged 100 hours flying. It was built by Rudy Nickel. A second AS-37A was built by Léon Knoepfli but was modified after a short test programme into the first AS-37B. The curtains were removed and their stiffening role taken by conventional wide chord cantilever interplane struts and the ailerons moved to the upper wing. Flaps were added to the lower wings. The undercarriage V-struts were replaced with glass fibre faired cantilever legs, with fairings enclosing all three wheels. These changes increased the empty weight to 451 kg (995 lb).

By about 1979 the Citroën engines of both the AS-37A and AS-37B had been replaced with more powerful 75 kW (100 hp) Porsche 2 flat-fours. The first AS-37B was then heavily modified by its builder into the Knoepfli VSTOL. The wings, empennage, forward fuselage and undercarriage of the AS-37B were retained but the rear fuselage was replaced with a slim, low set, flat sided, slightly upward curved beam, allowing a new and more conventional pusher engine and propeller combination to be placed immediately behind the cabin, just above the original fuselage line. These alterations were made before the end of summer 1980 and may have included another engine change to a Renault 343.

Between 1980 and 1998 the AS-37A had undergone further modifications with the installation of tractor, rather than pusher, propellers, belt driven as before. The undercarriage was altered into a similar form to that of the AS-37B though without the wheel fairings. This version was renamed the Starck-Nickel SN.01.

The SN.01 was active until at least 1998 but is now (2012) a museum display item, see below; the third airframe (the second AS-37B) also survives in a museum (Muséum Régional de l'Air, Angers) but is not on public display.

Though plans for 23 aircraft had been sold by 1980, it seems only one more, the second AS-37B, was completed.

== Variants ==
Starck AS-37A
Original version.
Starck AS-37B
Second aircraft after curtain and undercarriage modifications; third aircraft.
Starck-Nickel SN.01
First aircraft, tractor propellers.
Knoepfli VSTOL
Second aircraft with new low set boom fuselage permitting a direct drive pusher engine installation behind cabin.

== Aircraft on display ==
The Starck-Nickel SN.01 is on display in the Musée Aéronautique Presqu'île Côte d'Amour at la Baule aerodrome.

== Specifications (AS-37A) ==
Data from Jane's All the World's Aircraft 1980/81

General characteristics

- Crew: 2
- Length: 6.00 m (19 ft 8 in)
- Wingspan: 6.30 m (20 ft 8 in)
- Height: 1.60 m (5 ft 3 in)
- Wing area: 13.60 m^{2} (146.4 sq ft)
- Empty weight: 400 kg (882 lb)
- Max takeoff weight: 620 kg (1,367 lb)
- Powerplant: 1 × Citroën GS 1220 4-cylinder air-cooled, 48 kW (65 hp)
- Propellers: 2-bladed

Performance

- Maximum speed: 185 km/h (115 mph, 100 kn) at sea level
- Cruise speed: 170 km/h (110 mph, 92 kn) at sea level
- Range: 1,500 km (930 mi, 810 nmi) with 90 L (24 US gal; 20 Imp gal) fuel
- Service ceiling: 4,500 m (14,800 ft)
- Rate of climb: 3.5 m/s (690 ft/min) at sea level
- Take-off run: 200 m (655 ft)
- Landing run: 140 m (460 ft)
