= Shavrov Sh-2 =

Sh-2
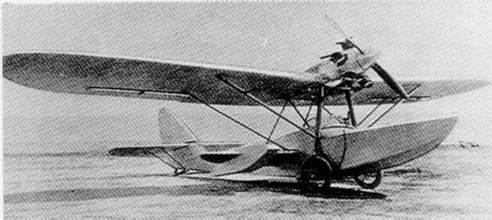

General information
- Type: Amphibious aircraft
- Manufacturer: Zavod 23, Zavod 31, Aeroflot, and others
- Designer: Vadim Borisovich Shavrov
- Primary users: Soviet Air Forces (VVS) Aeroflot
- Number built: 700+

History
- Manufactured: 1934-1952
- Introduction date: 1933
- First flight: 11 November 1930
- Retired: 1964
- Developed from: Sh-1

The Shavrov Sh-2 (later ASh-2) was a 1930s Soviet amphibious sesquiplane flying boat developed from the Sh-1, with a more powerful engine, slightly increased size and amphibious undercarriage. The Sh-2 could carry three people including the crew.

== Design and development ==
The Shavrov Sh-2 was developed from the Sh-1 flying boat prototype, which had been built in Shavrov's apartment and which first flew on 21 June, 1929. The Sh-2 was a slight enlargement of the Sh-1, with some detail improvements.

The hull was primarily constructed of pine with the keel and longerons being ash, with a 3mm plywood skinning covering 25 frames, of which 4 were watertight bulkheads. The planing bottom was covered with 6mm plywood, and the entire structure was covered in doped fabric. The cockpit seated three, with a pilot and passenger in the front, both with controls, and an additional passenger behind them while cargo or additional fuel could be carried in the nose and under the seats. The wings formed a staggered sesquiplane, and the outer wing panels, which were given 3 degree of dihedral could be folded back along the fuselage. The centre section used the Kol'chugaliminum aluminium alloy and had a dead eye for hoisting onto ships. The small cantilevered lower wing served as attachment for the stabilizing floats. The cruciform tail had horn balanced elevators, while the rudder was slightly enlarged over that of the Sh-1. The undercarriage retracted by rotating forwards and up in an arc until the axle was level with the cockpit coaming, pulled into position with cables and springs. It could also be fitted with skis for winter operations from ice and snow, while some examples had the undercarriage removed, or weren't built with them. During 1950s, more powerful versions of M-11 were fitted, and some examples were modified with enclosed cabins.

== Operational history ==
The prototype Sh-2, which had been built at Zavod No.23 in Leningrad made its first flight on November 11, 1930. State Acceptance trials were carried out through 1931, and were passed on 9 May, 1932, without problems, having previously passed its trials for Aeroflot, and series production began in 1933, with the first production batch of 270 being built at Zavod No.31 in Taganrog. Production eventually exceeded 700 aircraft, with the last examples being built in small workshops, in 1952. The Sh-2 remained in service until 1964 and set a number of unofficial flying boat and seaplanes records. The Sh-2 replaced the obsolete MU-1 floatplane, whose design dated from before World War One, with the Soviet Air Forces. Examples were operated from the SS Chelyuskin, Fyodor Litke and Krasin icebreakers as well as other vessels. One example was used as a glider tug for the Gribovsky G-16 hydrofoil flying boat glider prototype. Aeroflot was not only a major operator of the Sh-2, they also built them in their own workshops, including 30 to 35 in 1941.

On 28 August 1942, the Finns captured two Sh-2s and impressed them into service in the liaison role.

== Variants ==
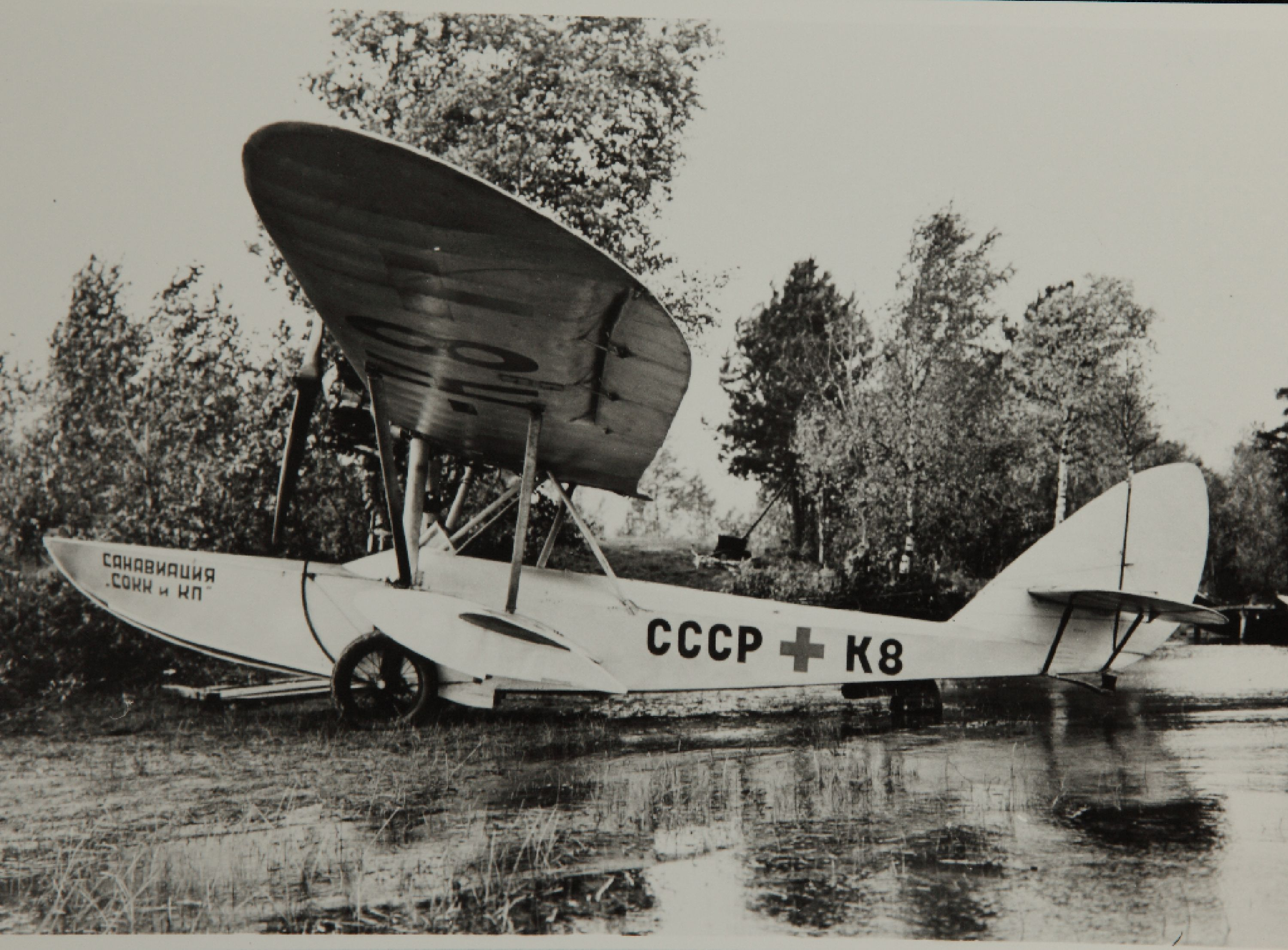
Shavrov Sh-2S Ambulance

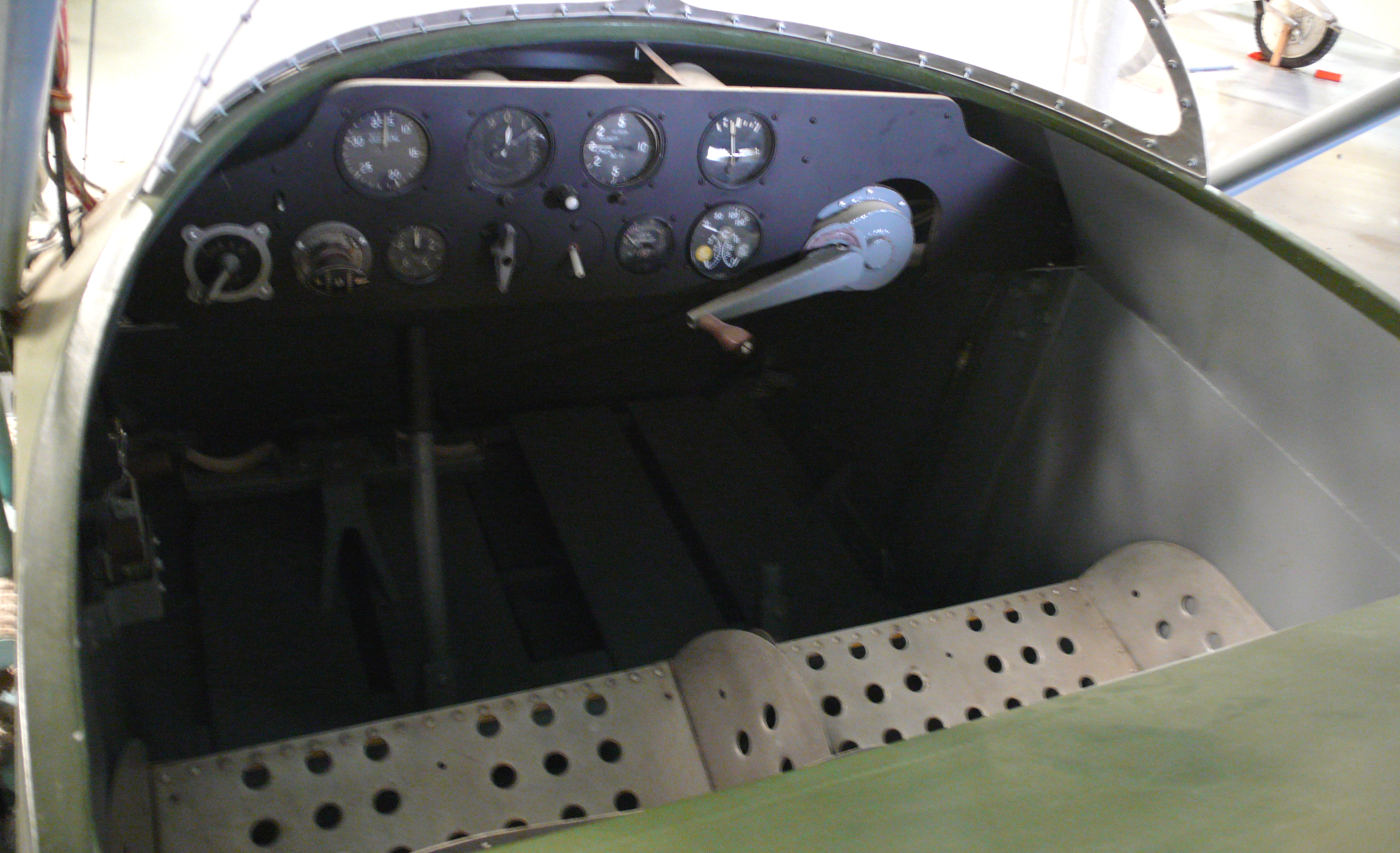
Cockpit of a Shavrov Sh-2 seaplane, Historic Aircraft Restoration Museum, St Louis

Sh-1
small flying boat home-built prototype
Sh-2
main production variant, used as a utility transport, for liaison, as mailplane, trainer, and flying ambulance, and for agriculture, fishery and forestry protection, ice reconnaissance and frontier patrol, as well as by many executive committees all over Russia.
Sh-2S
ambulance version, 16 built
Sh-2bis
version with glazed crew cabin and M-11L-engines

== Operators ==
Finland

- Finnish Air Force operated two captured examples

Soviet Union

- Aeroflot operated large numbers from 1934 onwards
- Glavryba directorate operated 9 for fisheries patrols from 1934 while the People's commissariat for fisheries operated 14 from 1941
- Sanaviatsiya
- Soviet Air Forces
  - Maxim Gorky Agiteskadril (En: Maxim Gorky Propaganda Squadron) operated one example in 1934-1935

== Specifications (Sh-2 amphibian) ==
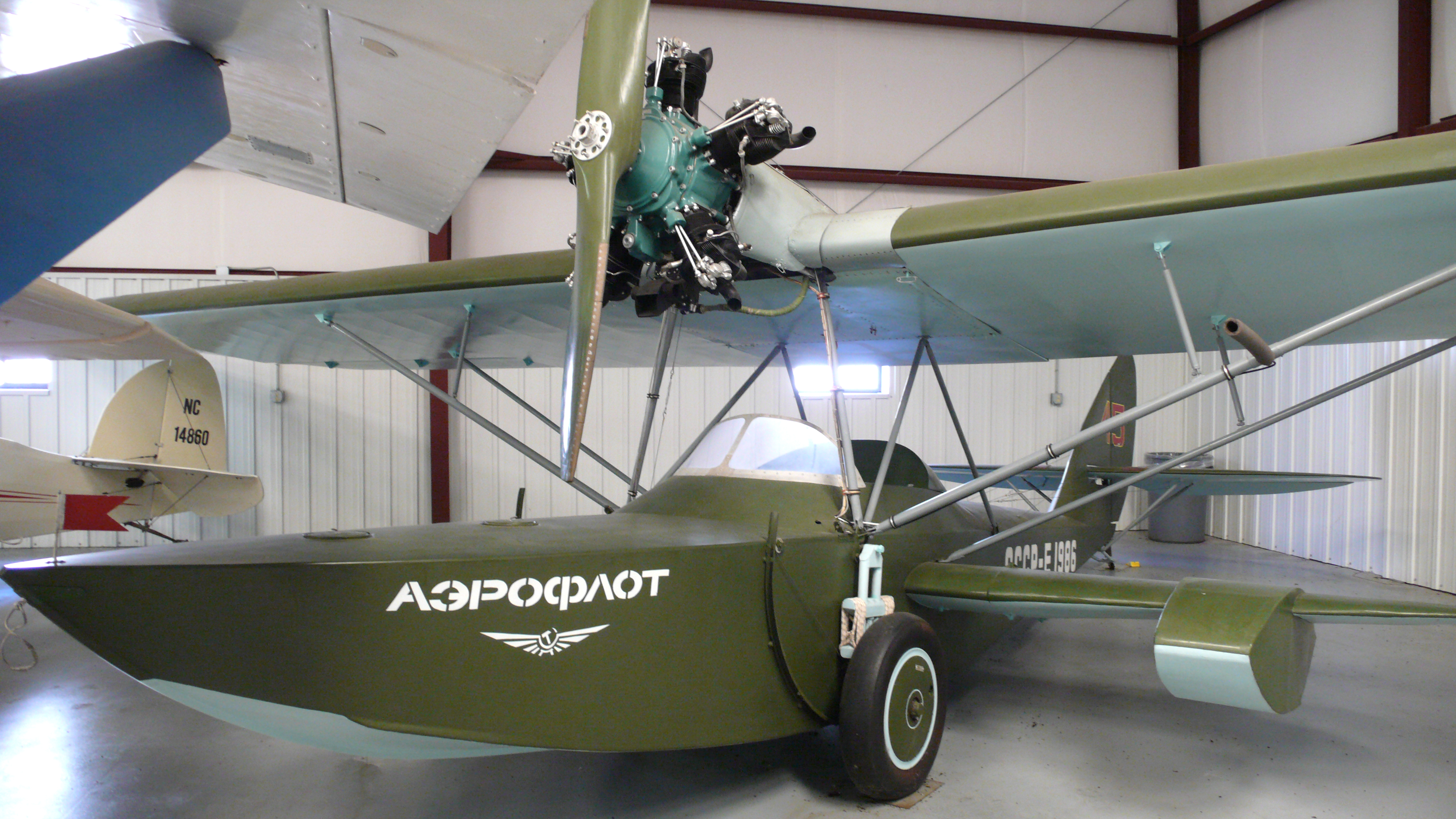
Shavrov Sh-2, at the Historic Aircraft Restoration Museum.

Data from Soviet aircraft and aviation, 1917-1941

General characteristics

- Crew: One
- Capacity: 2 passengers
- Length: 8.2 m (26 ft 11 in)
- Upper wingspan: 13 m (42 ft 8 in)
- Lower wingspan: 5.42 m (17 ft 9 in)
- Height: 2.5 m (8 ft 2 in)
- Wing area: 24.7 m^{2} (266 sq ft)
- Empty weight: 660 kg (1,455 lb)
- Gross weight: 1,160 kg (2,557 lb)
- Maximum load: 500 kg (1,100 lb)
- Fuel capacity: 332 L (73 imp gal; 88 US gal) in three main 105 L (23 imp gal; 28 US gal) tanks and a 17 L (3.7 imp gal; 4.5 US gal) gravity tank
- Powerplant: 1 × Shvetsov M-11 5-cylinder air-cooled radial piston engine, 75 kW (100 hp)
- Propellers: 2-bladed fixed-pitch propeller

Performance

- Maximum speed: 139 km/h (86 mph, 75 kn)
- Cruise speed: 120 km/h (75 mph, 65 kn)
- Minimum control speed: 65 km/h (40 mph, 35 kn)
- Range: 1,300 km (810 mi, 700 nmi)
- Service ceiling: 3,350 m (10,990 ft)
- Time to altitude: 8.9 minutes to 1,000 m (3,300 ft)

== See also ==
Related lists

- List of interwar military aircraft
- List of aircraft of World War II
