= Stewart Aircraft Corporation =

Aircraft manufacturer

- Company type: Private company
- Industry: Aerospace
- Founded: 1961
- Founder: Don Stewart
- Headquarters: Vulcan, Michigan, United States of America
- Key people: Donald Stewart
- Products: Kit aircraft
- Website: sites.google.com/site/flywithstewart/

Stewart Aircraft Corporation is an American aircraft manufacturer specializing in aircraft kits and plans. Don Stewart, a former airline pilot, designed several aircraft that are sold by the company. The company's first product, the Headwind, was one of the earliest examples of a homebuilt aircraft designed to use an air-cooled Volkswagen automotive engine with a patented gear reduction unit for the propeller.

== Closure of business ==
The Stewart Headwind Corporation website is down. The flywithstewart website states: "As of Dec. 2021 Don is no longer selling plans." As of Oct 2024, plans are in work to offer sets of drawings again. Pricing will be available shortly

== Aircraft ==
Summary of aircraft built by Stewart Aircraft Corporation
Model name	First flight	Type
Stewart Headwind	1961	Single place highwing homebuilt aircraft
Stewart Foo Fighter	1967	Single place biplane homebuilt aircraft
