= Steere Bodacious =

Bodacious
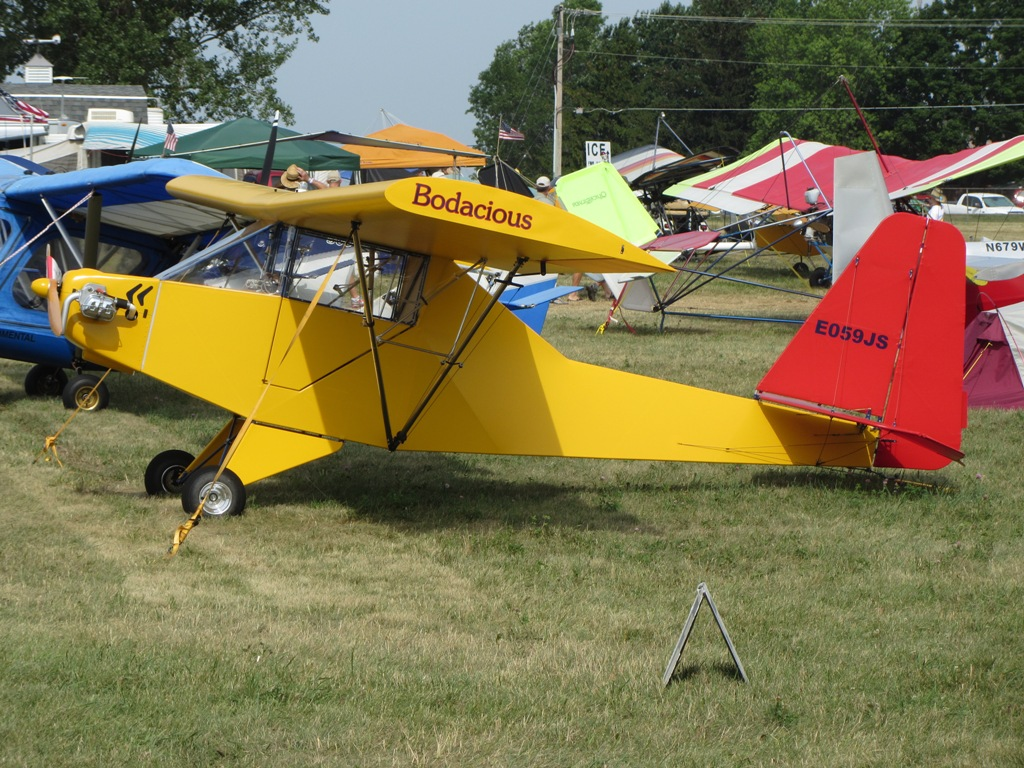

General information
- Type: Ultralight aircraft
- National origin: United States
- Manufacturer: John Steere
- Designer: John Steere
- Number built: 1

History
- First flight: 2012
- Developed from: Milholland Legal Eagle

The Steere Bodacious is an American single seat original design ultralight aircraft.

== Design ==
The Bodacious was a project started as a Legal Eagle ultralight, but was redesigned to become an enclosed aircraft. The aircraft is a single engine, strut-braced, high wing ultralight with conventional landing gear. The aluminum spar wings use wooden ribs and fold rearward for towing or storage. The aircraft is covered with Oratex, a pre-colored covering used in model aircraft building.

== Operational history ==
The prototype Bodacious won the Reserve Grand Champion Ultralight award at the 2012 EAA AirVenture Oshkosh airshow.

== Specifications (Bodacious) ==
Data from Aero News Network

General characteristics

- Crew: 1
- Empty weight: 261 lb (118 kg) with parachute, cowling and doors removed
- Powerplant: 1 × 1/2 Hummel Volkswagen conversion Two cylinder, horizontally opposed

Performance

- Cruise speed: 52 kn (60 mph, 97 km/h)
- Stall speed: 23 kn (27 mph, 43 km/h)
- Endurance: 2.5 hr

== See also ==
Related development

- Milholland Legal Eagle

Aircraft of comparable role, configuration, and era

- Belite Ultra Cub
