= Staib Helicopter =

Homebuilt aircraft design

General information
- Type: Homebuilt aircraft
- National origin: United States
- Designer: Wilbur Staib
- Number built: 1

The Staib Helicopter is a homebuilt aircraft design of Wilbur Staib.

== Design and development ==
Wilbur Staib (1914-1993) was a self-taught aircraft designer from Diamond, Missouri. Staib served as a flight instructor during the Second World War at Chanute, Kansas flying PT-14's. Staib designed and built five different "LB" (Little Bastard) aircraft and a helicopter, of which several had the title "world's smallest" at their time of construction. Staib flew his aircraft in airshows with the title "The Diamond Wizard".

The Staib Helicopter is a powered by a Continental C85 with a V-belt linkage. The gearbox is sourced from a Ford Model A, the clutch from a Studebaker, the rotors cut down from a Brantly B-2 and cooling system from a Chevrolet Corvair. Four different rotor heads were tested.

== Operational history ==
The prototype was flown tethered with a 65 hp (48 kW) engine then upgraded to an 85 hp (63 kW) engine.

== Specifications (Staib Helicopter) ==
Data from Air Trails

General characteristics

- Crew: 1
- Empty weight: 500 lb (227 kg)
- Fuel capacity: 14 U.S. gallons (53 L; 12 imp gal)
- Powerplant: 1 × Continental C85 , 85 hp (63 kW)
- Main rotor diameter: 20 ft (6.1 m)
