= Starck AS-70 Jac =

AS-70 Jac
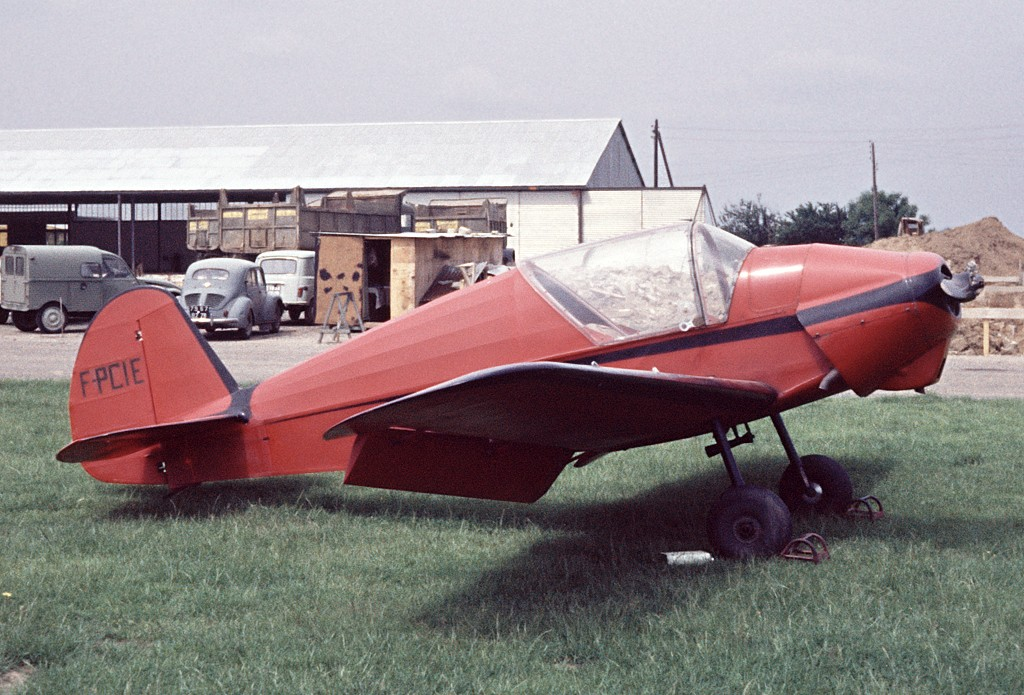
- Starck A.S.75 Jac, with Continental engine, at Guyancourt airfield near Paris in June 1963

General information
- Type: Single seat light aircraft
- National origin: France
- Manufacturer: Avions Starck
- Status: In service
- Primary users: Private pilot owners Aero clubs
- Number built: 19

History
- Introduction date: 1946
- First flight: 23 May 1945

The Starck AS-70 Jac is a French-built single-seat light aircraft of the mid-1940s.

== Development ==
The AS-70 was developed during 1945 as a single-seat light low-wing monoplane aircraft to serve the early postwar needs of French private pilots and aero clubs. It is of mixed welded steel tube and wooden construction with fabric covering, and is fully aerobatic.

A small series of Jacs was constructed by Avions Starck. These were fitted with a range of engines with power outputs of between 45 and 65 hp (34 and 48 kW). Different designations were given to aircraft powered by the various engines, as listed below.

== Operational history ==
The Jac proved to be a popular aircraft with private pilots and aero clubs and four examples remained in service in 2009.

== Variants ==
AS-70
Fitted with a 45 hp (34 kW) Salmson 9 ADb radial engine.
AS-71
Fitted with a 65 hp (48 kW) Walter Mikron II engine.
AS-72
Fitted with a Salmson 9 ADr radial engine.
AS-72/1
Fitted with a Percy II engine.
AS-75
Fitted with a 65 hp (48 kW) Continental A65-8S 4-cylinder air-cooled engine.

== Specifications (AS-75) ==
Data from Green

General characteristics

- Crew: One
- Capacity: One passenger
- Length: 5.36 m (17 ft 7 in)
- Wingspan: 7.39 m (24 ft 3 in)
- Height: 1.60 m (5 ft 3 in)
- Wing area: 8.0 m^{2} (86 sq ft)
- Empty weight: 197 kg (435 lb)
- Gross weight: 317 kg (698 lb)
- Powerplant: 1 × Continental A65-8S four-cylinder aircraft engine, 48 kW (65 hp)

Performance

- Maximum speed: 202.7 km/h (126.0 mph, 109.4 kn)
- Cruise speed: 185 km/h (115 mph, 100 kn)
- Range: 514 km (319 mi, 278 nmi)
