= St. Louis C2 Cardinal =

C2 Cardinal
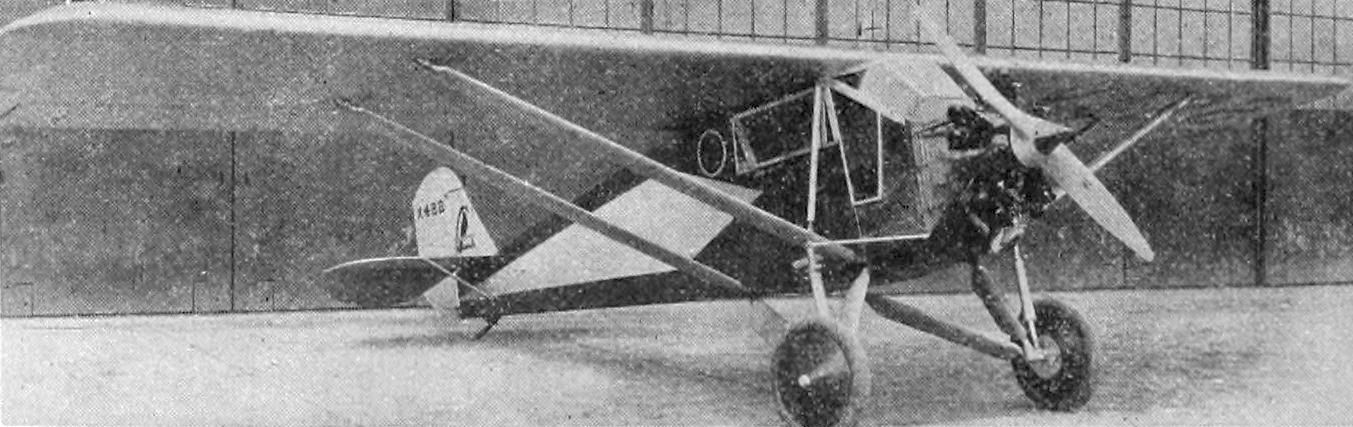

General information
- Type: Sport Monoplane
- National origin: United States of America
- Manufacturer: St. Louis Aircraft Corporation
- Number built: 22

History
- Manufactured: 1928 - 1931

The St. Louis C2 Cardinal family are a series of light sport monoplanes built by the St. Louis Aircraft Corporation during the peak of the Lindbergh Boom after the Spirit of St. Louis flight of 1927.

== Design and development ==
The Cardinal shares close proportions with the Monocoupe Model 22 also designed and built in St. Louis in 1927. The Cardinal is a two seat high wing conventional geared aircraft with side-by-side configuration seating. The fuselage is constructed with welded steel tubing. The spar is made of spruce and ribs are basswood with aircraft fabric covering. The ailerons are controlled by push-pull tubes. The aircraft were delivered with progressively more powerful engines, the 65 hp (48 kW) LeBlond 5DE, 90 hp (67 kW) and 100 hp (75 kW) Kinner K-5, and one with a Warner 110 hp (82 kW) engine.

== Operational history ==
The prototype was presented at the 1929 Detroit Air Show.

== Variants ==
C2-60 Cardinal
1929 - 60 hp (45 kW) LeBlond 5D - 10 built

C2-65 Standard Cardinal
1929 - Modified C2-60 [C1111] - 65 hp (48 kW) LeBlond 5DE

C2-85 Cardinal
1930 - 85 hp (63 kW) LeBlond 5DF - 1 built [NC559N].

C2-90 Senior Cardinal
1929 - 90 hp (67 kW) LeBlond 7D - 6 built, with 1 converted from a C2-60.

C2-100 Super Cardinal
1929 - 110 hp (82 kW) Warner Scarab - 1 conversion [X12319] for factory tests.

C2-100 Special
1 converted from a C2-110

C2-110 Super Cardinal
1929 - 100 hp (75 kW) Kinner K-5 - 5 built with one converted from a C2-60

== Surviving aircraft ==
- 103 – C2 airworthy at the Western Antique Aeroplane & Automobile Museum in Hood River, Oregon.
- C-106 – C2-110 airworthy at the Historic Aircraft Restoration Museum in Maryland Heights, Missouri.

== Specifications (St. Louis C2-110 Super Cardinal) ==
Data from Greater St.Louis Air & Space Museum

General characteristics

- Capacity: 2
- Length: 20 ft 6 in (6.25 m)
- Wingspan: 105 ft 0 in (32 m)
- Height: 7 ft (2.1 m)
- Wing area: 160 sq ft (15 m^{2})
- Airfoil: Clark Y
- Empty weight: 1,006 lb (456 kg)
- Powerplant: 1 × Kinner K-5 5 cylinder radial, 100 hp (75 kW)

Performance

- Maximum speed: 109 kn (125 mph, 201 km/h)
- Cruise speed: 93 kn (107 mph, 172 km/h)
- Stall speed: 34 kn (39 mph, 63 km/h)
- Service ceiling: 15,000 ft (4,600 m)
- Rate of climb: 1,100 ft/min (5.6 m/s)

== See also ==
Aircraft of comparable role, configuration, and era

- Monocoupe Model 22
