= Staib LB-4 =

LB-4

General information
- Type: Homebuilt aircraft
- National origin: United States of America
- Designer: Wilbur Staib
- Number built: 1

History
- First flight: 1966

The Staib LB-4 a.k.a. Staib Airyplane is a homebuilt aircraft design of Wilbur Staib.

== Design and development ==
Wilbur Staib (1914–1993) was a self-taught aircraft designer from Diamond, Missouri. Staib served as a flight instructor during the Second World War at Chanute, Kansas flying PT-14s. Staib designed and built five different "LB" (Little Bastard) aircraft and a helicopter, of which several had the title "world's smallest" at their time of construction. Staib flew his aircraft in airshows with the title "The Diamond Wizard".

The LB-4 is a high-wing, uncovered welded steel tube fuselage, single seat twin-engine tricycle gear aircraft. It was registered by the FAA in 1966, and was considered at the time to be the world's smallest twin engine aircraft. The wing ribs were a shortened pattern from a Piper Cub, assembled with staples. The tail section is mounted on a wire braced removable boom for storage. Fuel tanks are made from 1 U.S. gallon (3.8 L; 0.83 imp gal) paint-thinner cans. The engines used recoil starters.

== Operational history ==
The LB-4 was test flown in 1966 at Carthage, Missouri. The aircraft cruises at 60 mph (97 km/h) and must be flown at full throttle. Later configurations included a third 10 hp (7 kW) engine mounted on top of the wing in pusher configuration.

== Specifications (Staib LB-1) ==
Data from Air Trails

General characteristics

- Crew: 1
- Length: 15 ft (4.6 m)
- Wingspan: 14 ft (4.3 m)
- Wing area: 70 sq ft (6.5 m^{2})
- Airfoil: Modified Clark-Y
- Empty weight: 175 lb (79 kg)
- Gross weight: 340 lb (154 kg)
- Fuel capacity: 2 U.S. gallons (7.6 L; 1.7 imp gal)
- Powerplant: 2 × West Bend 820 Chainsaw Two-Cycle Piston, 10 hp (7.5 kW) each
- Propellers: 2-bladed Troyer

Performance

- Maximum speed: 52 kn (60 mph, 97 km/h)
- Cruise speed: 52 kn (60 mph, 97 km/h)
- Stall speed: 30 kn (35 mph, 56 km/h)

== See also ==
Aircraft of comparable role, configuration, and era

- RLU-1 Breezy open frame high-wing.
- Colomban Cri-cri single seat twin.
