= Stampe et Vertongen RSV.32 =

RSV.32
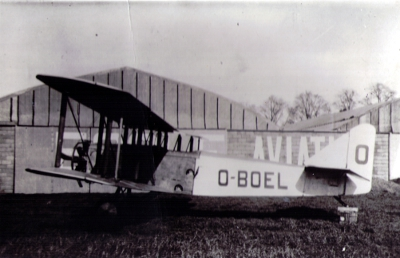
- RSV 32-90

General information
- Type: trainer aircraft
- National origin: Belgium
- Manufacturer: Stampe et Vertongen
- Designer: Alfred Renard
- Primary user: Belgian Air Force
- Number built: 57 (disputed)

History
- First flight: 1923

The Stampe et Vertongen RSV.32 was a trainer aircraft produced in Belgium in the early 1920s. Designed originally for the Stampe et Vertongen flying school, the Belgian Air Force became a major operator of the type, where it became the first aircraft of entirely Belgian design and manufacture to enter service. Many others were purchased by flying clubs and private owners. No RSV.32 was in existence by the end of World War II.

== History ==
Jean Stampe and Maurice Vertongen, veterans of World War I, founded a flying school at Deurne in 1923. Their research into the training aircraft then available led them to believe that the British-built Central Centaur IV was the best choice for their school. When they discovered that the Centaur IV had just ceased production, their friend, Maurice Boel, introduced them to engineer Alfred Renard, whom Stampe and Vertongen contracted to design a similar aircraft that could be built cheaply and locally. Renard's response was a conventional two-bay biplane with unstaggered wings of equal span. Power was provided by a radial engine in the nose. The student pilot and instructor sat in tandem in a single, open cockpit and communicated through a speaking tube. The main units of the fixed undercarriage shared a common axle, and the tail was supported by a skid. Construction was of wood throughout, braced with wire and covered in fabric, and stressed to withstand rough treatment by student pilots. To reduce costs, many parts were interchangeable, including the struts, longerons, undercarriage legs, and even the upper and lower wings. Initial construction of the prototype commenced in a dance hall in Evere and was completed in the hangar of the Administration de l'Aéronautique (the Belgian Aviation Administration) on 23 April 1923,. The aircraft was registered O-BOEL in honour of the friend who introduced Renard to Stampe and Vertongen. After the prototype had been tested, King Albert I paid a royal visit to Stampe et Vertongen and asked for a joy ride over Antwerp in it.

The RSV.32 was produced between 1923 and 1932 and the total number built is sometimes given as fifty-seven, however Paul de Meyer, writing for Air-Britain Digest in 1980 called this number "unlikely" and "greatly exaggerated". The type saw service with not only Stampe et Vertongen's school, but flying schools at Gosselies and Saint-Hubert as well. The Belgian Air Force purchased nineteen examples in three batches. These served until 1936, when surviving machines were sold to private owners. Flying clubs that operated the type included the Antwerp Aviation Club and the Aéro-Club Royal Belge. At least one private owner added a third seat to the aircraft, and at least three examples were converted to 2+2 seating with a fuselage modification designed by Renard. This latter configuration was designated the RSV.32/2X2.

== Variants ==
The RSV.32 was built in at least seven variants. The precise subtype is known for forty-one aircraft:

RSV.32/90
version with 67-kW (90-hp) Anzani 10C engine (at least 9 built).
RSV.32/100
version with 75-kW (100-hp) Renard engine (at least 8 built)
RSV.32/105
version with 78-kW (105-hp) Hermes engine (at least 1 built)
RSV.32/110
version with 82-kW (110-hp) Lorraine engine (at least 19 built, main production version for the Belgian Air Force)
RSV.32/120
version with 90-kW (120-hp) Renard engine (at least 2 built)
RSV.32/GII
version with 90-kW (120-hp) de Havilland Gipsy engine, a fuselage oval in cross-section, and extra cabane struts to reduce wire bracing and make the forward cockpit more accessible (1 built)
RSV.32/130
version with 97-kW (130-hp) Walter engine (at least 1 built)

RSV.32/2X2
fuselage conversion to provide 2+2 seating (3 converted, including 1 32/100 and 2 32/120)

Additionally, one RSV.32 was to be fitted with an 82-kW (110-hp) Renard engine and possibly amphibious undercarriage, but this machine was never built.

Finally, note that some of these aircraft were converted from other subtypes, so the same airframe might in some cases be counted twice in the production figures.

== Operators ==
Belgium

- Belgian Air Force

Spanish Republic

- Spanish Republican Air Force

== Specifications (RSV.32/90) ==
Data from Jouhaut 1999, p.33, except as noted

General characteristics

- Crew: two
- Length: 7.35 m (24 ft 1 in)
- Wingspan: 11.20 m (36 ft 9 in)
- Height: 2.80 m (9 ft 2 in)
- Wing area: 32.0 m^{2} (344 sq ft)
- Empty weight: 500 kg (1,100 lb)
- Gross weight: 800 kg (1,800 lb)
- Powerplant: 1 × Anzani 10C , 67 kW (90 hp)

Performance

- Maximum speed: 125 km/h (78 mph, 68 kn)
- Service ceiling: 5,000 m (16,000 ft)
- Rate of climb: 2.3 m/s (450 ft/min)

== See also ==
Related lists

- List of Interwar military aircraft
- List of aircraft of the Spanish Republican Air Force
