= Stewart Headwind =

General information
- Type: Homebuilt aircraft
- National origin: United States
- Manufacturer: Stewart Aircraft Corporation
- Designer: Don Stewart

History
- Introduction date: 1962
- First flight: 1962

The Stewart Headwind JD1HW1.7 and SAC-1VW is a single-seat high-wing tube-and-fabric construction homebuilt aircraft.

== Design and development ==
The first Headwind was flown on March 28, 1962. It was one of the first aircraft to fly in the United States using a VW engine. The prototype flew with a Huggins VW conversion. To use a standard propeller, a patented PRSU (propeller speed reducing unit) was developed to keep the engine RPM high and propeller RPM at its optimum speed.

The design was inspired by the Demoiselle by Alberto Santos-Dumont. The fuselage is triangular sections of welded tube steel covered in fabric.

== Variants ==
A Volkswagen air-cooled engine was the only engine specified for this model, however many examples exist with alternate engine installations.

== Specifications Stewart Headwind ==
Data from Sport Aviation

General characteristics

- Crew: 1
- Length: 17 ft (5.2 m)
- Wingspan: 24 ft 2 in (7.37 m)
- Height: 5 ft 9 in (1.75 m)
- Wing area: 110.95 sq ft (10.308 m^{2})
- Empty weight: 300 lb (136 kg)
- Gross weight: 650 lb (295 kg)
- Fuel capacity: 5 U.S. gallons (19 L; 4.2 imp gal)
- Powerplant: 1 × Volkswagen air-cooled engine automotive conversion engine, 65 hp (48 kW)
- Propellers: 2-bladed wooden

Performance

- Maximum speed: 74 kn (85 mph, 137 km/h)
- Cruise speed: 70 kn (80 mph, 130 km/h)
- Stall speed: 33 kn (38 mph, 61 km/h)
- Never exceed speed: 96 kn (110 mph, 180 km/h)
- Range: 169 nmi (195 mi, 314 km)
- Endurance: 2 hours
- Service ceiling: 7,000 ft (2,100 m)
- Rate of climb: 650 ft/min (3.3 m/s)

== See also ==
Aircraft of comparable role, configuration, and era

- Grega Aircamper
- Aeronca C-3
- Ultravia Le Pelican
