= Starck AS.20 =

AS.20
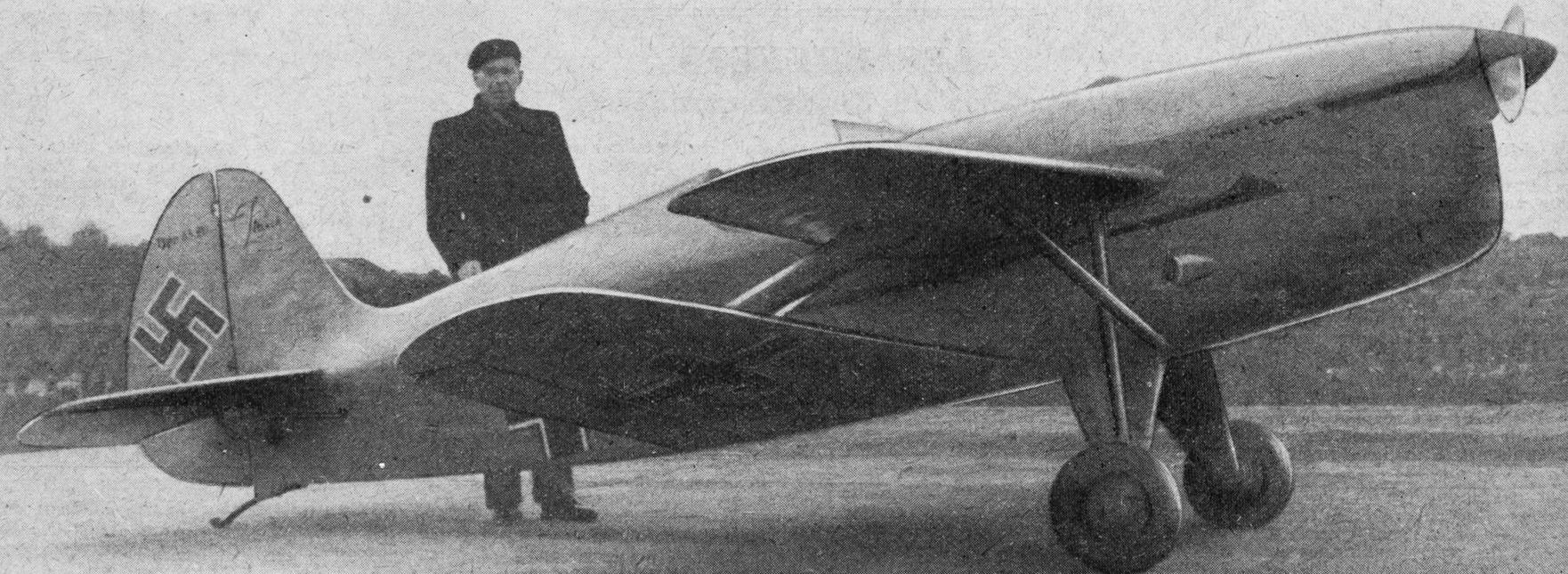

General information
- Type: Experimental aircraft
- National origin: France
- Designer: André Starck
- Number built: 1

History
- First flight: 23 October 1942

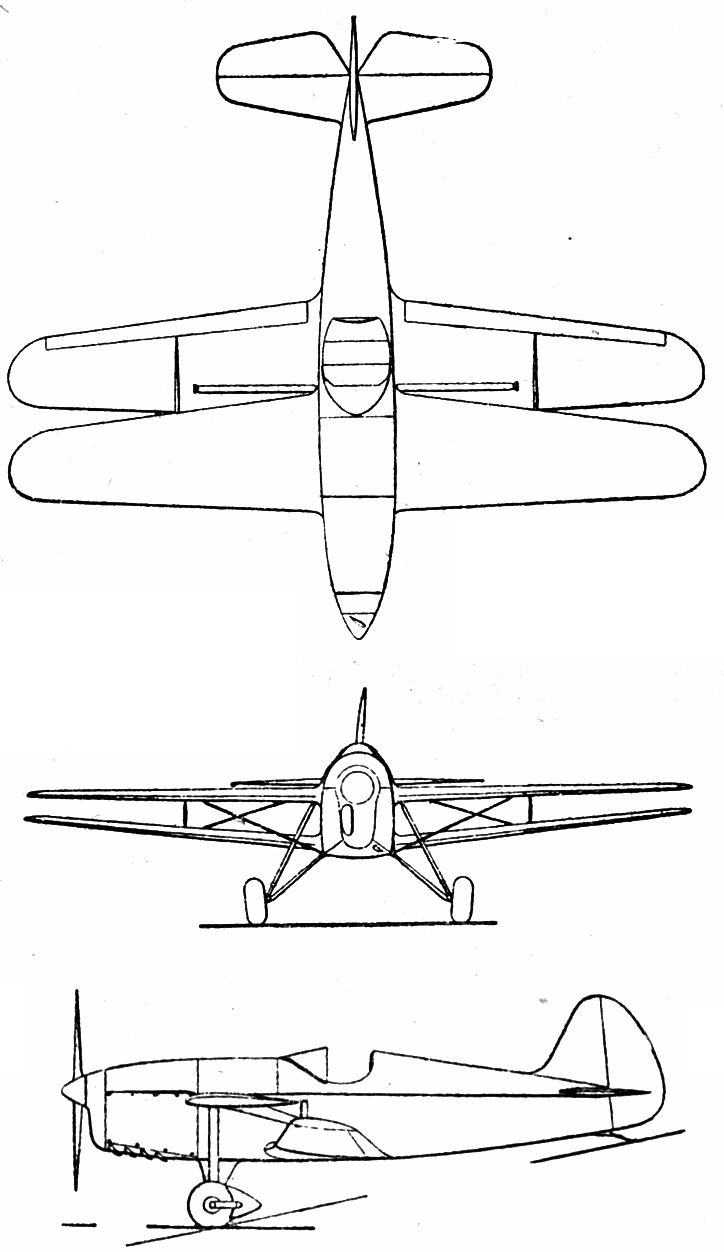
Starck AS-20 3-view

The Starck AS.20 was an experimental single seat narrow-gap biplane built in France in the early 1940s. Despite the occupation of France, construction continued into 1941.

== Specifications ==
Data from

General characteristics

- Crew: 1
- Length: 5.30 m (17 ft 5 in)
- Wingspan: 5.84 m (19 ft 2 in)
- Wing area: 8.00 m^{2} (86.1 sq ft)
- Empty weight: 226 kg (498 lb)
- Gross weight: 373 kg (822 lb)
- Powerplant: 1 × Régnier 4D2 air-cooled flat four, 55 kW (74 hp)
- Propellers: 2-bladed

Performance

- Maximum speed: 240 km/h (150 mph, 130 kn)
- Range: 1,400 km (870 mi, 760 nmi)
- Service ceiling: 7,500 m (24,600 ft)
