= Staib LB-1 =

LB-1

General information
- Type: Homebuilt aircraft
- National origin: United States
- Designer: Wilbur Staib

History
- Introduction date: 1949

[[

The Staib LB-1 Special is a homebuilt aircraft design of Wilbur Staib.

== Design and development ==
Wilbur Staib (1914–1993) was a self-taught aircraft designer from Diamond, Missouri. Staib served as a flight instructor during the Second World War at Chanute, Kansas flying PT-14s. He designed and built five different "LB" (Little Bastard) aircraft and a helicopter, of which several had the title "world's smallest". He flew his aircraft in air shows with the title "The Diamond Wizard".

The LB-1 was a single engine, open cockpit biplane with conventional landing gear. The low-cost construction included using brazed steel bedspring wire for wing-ribs, and bed-sheet muslin covering. The airfoil was patterned on a Taylorcraft BC-12D. The aircraft used three fuel tanks: one in the headrest, one in the baggage compartment and one against the firewall. The red and white checkerboard-painted aircraft was outfitted with a smoke system for air show work.

== Operational history ==
Staib used the LB-1 to perform on the pro-akro circuit, performing stunts such as inverted ribbon cuts. His LB-1 was comparable to the Pitts Special flown by Betty Skelton at the same shows. The aircraft performed from 1949 to 1952. The prototype was registered as late as 1990.

== Specifications (Staib LB-1) ==
Data from Air Trails

General characteristics

- Crew: 1
- Length: 15 ft (4.6 m)
- Wingspan: 17 ft (5.2 m)
- Height: 5 ft (1.5 m)
- Wing area: 95 sq ft (8.8 m^{2})
- Empty weight: 600 lb (272 kg)
- Fuel capacity: 17 U.S. gallons (64 L; 14 imp gal)
- Powerplant: 1 × Continental C-85 horizontally opposed piston aircraft engine
- Propellers: 2-bladed Metal

Performance

- Maximum speed: 96 kn (110 mph, 180 km/h)
- Cruise speed: 87 kn (100 mph, 160 km/h)
- Stall speed: 48 kn (55 mph, 89 km/h)
- Endurance: 2.5hr

== See also ==
Aircraft of comparable role, configuration, and era

- Pitts Special
