= Thieffry =

Thieffry can refer to:

- Edmond Thieffry (1892–1929), Belgian First World War air ace and aviation pioneer
- Jacques Thieffry (1924–2006), French field hockey player
- Thieffry metro station, Brussels
