= Stampe et Vertongen ST.26 =

General information
- Type: trainer aircraft
- National origin: Belgium
- Manufacturer: Stampe et Vertongen
- Designer: George W. Ivanov

History
- First flight: 1932
- Developed from: Stampe et Vertongen RSV.28

The Stampe et Vertongen ST.26 was a 1930s Belgian military blind- and night-flying trainer aircraft.

== Design and development ==
The ST.26 was one of a long line of biplanes designed by Stampe et Vertongen with design input from Renard. Stampe et Vertongen's unusual type numbering system recorded wing area (in square metres) rather than chronological sequence. Its immediate predecessor was the 1929 RSV.28/180 Type III or RSV.28-PSV (pilotage sans visibilité, French for blind flying) so the ST.26 had reduced wing area as well as a different engine.

It was a single bay design with wings built around two spruce and plywood spars and fabric covered. Its equal span wings had 300 mm (12 in) stagger and were braced by forward leaning, parallel interplane struts. They were rectangular in plan apart from rounded tips, a long cut-out in the upper trailing edge and a shorter one in the trailing edge edge to improve the field of view from the forward cockpit. Both upper and lower wings were in two parts, the latter attached to the lower fuselage longerons. The upper halves joined a central dural frame supported by a cabane formed by pairs of upright, transverse N-form cabane struts. There were ailerons on both upper and lower wings, externally interconnected.

The ST.26 was powered by an Armstrong Siddeley Lynx, a 215 hp (160 kW), seven cylinder radial in the nose under a narrow chord, Townend ring fairing. It was gravity-fed from a 120 L (26 imp gal; 32 US gal) tank in the upper wing centre-section and attached to a stamped metal frame tube-mounted to the forward fuselage bulkhead, ahead of the cabane. Behind it the fuselage frame was formed by four longerons in either spruce or beech, depending on local stresses, producing a flat-sided fuselage. This contained two dual control cockpits in tandem with the instructor under the upper cut-out; behind it the upper fuselage had raised decking. The student's cockpit was equipped with a totally enclosing blind flying hood. The ST.26 was also equipped for night-flying training, with electric searchlights and droppable flares under student control. At the rear the tail was conventional with a flight-adjustable, semi-elliptical tailplane mounted on top of the fuselage and carrying separate, rounded elevators. The fin had a near-quadrantal profile and carried a rounded, unbalanced rudder which moved in the elevator gap.

Its fixed landing gear was of the split axle type and provided a wide 2.4 m (94 in) track. Each axle was a pair of hinged tubes from the central fuselage, positioning the wheels well ahead of the centre of gravity to minimize the risk of nose-overs. The outer, converging axle ends met vertical Messier oleo struts, passing ahead of the leading edges and held at their upper ends by short V-struts from the upper fuselage longerons. The wheels were independently brakeable and its steel tailskid steerable.

Little is known about the ST.26's career. Its first flight was in 1932, though a more precise date is lacking. It has been reported as continuing the development of the RSV.28 but how long it survived the difficult financial conditions of the early 1930s is, again, unknown.

== Specifications ==
Data from Les Ailes 1932

General characteristics

- Crew: two, pupil and instructor
- Length: 8.30 m (27 ft 3 in)
- Wingspan: 10.27 m (33 ft 8 in)
- Height: 2.90 m (9 ft 6 in)
- Wing area: 26 m^{2} (280 sq ft)
- Empty weight: 800 kg (1,764 lb)
- Gross weight: 1,100 kg (2,425 lb)
- Fuel capacity: 120 L (26 imp gal; 32 US gal)
- Powerplant: 1 × Armstrong Siddeley Lynx 7 cylinder radial, 160 kW (215 hp)
- Propellers: 2-bladed

Performance

- Maximum speed: 175 km/h (109 mph, 94 kn)
- Cruise speed: 145 km/h (90 mph, 78 kn)
- Landing speed: 72 km/h (45 mph; 39 kn)
- Range: 400 km (250 mi, 220 nmi)
- Service ceiling: 5,500 m (18,000 ft)
