= Belgian aircraft registration and serials =

Belgian aircraft identification

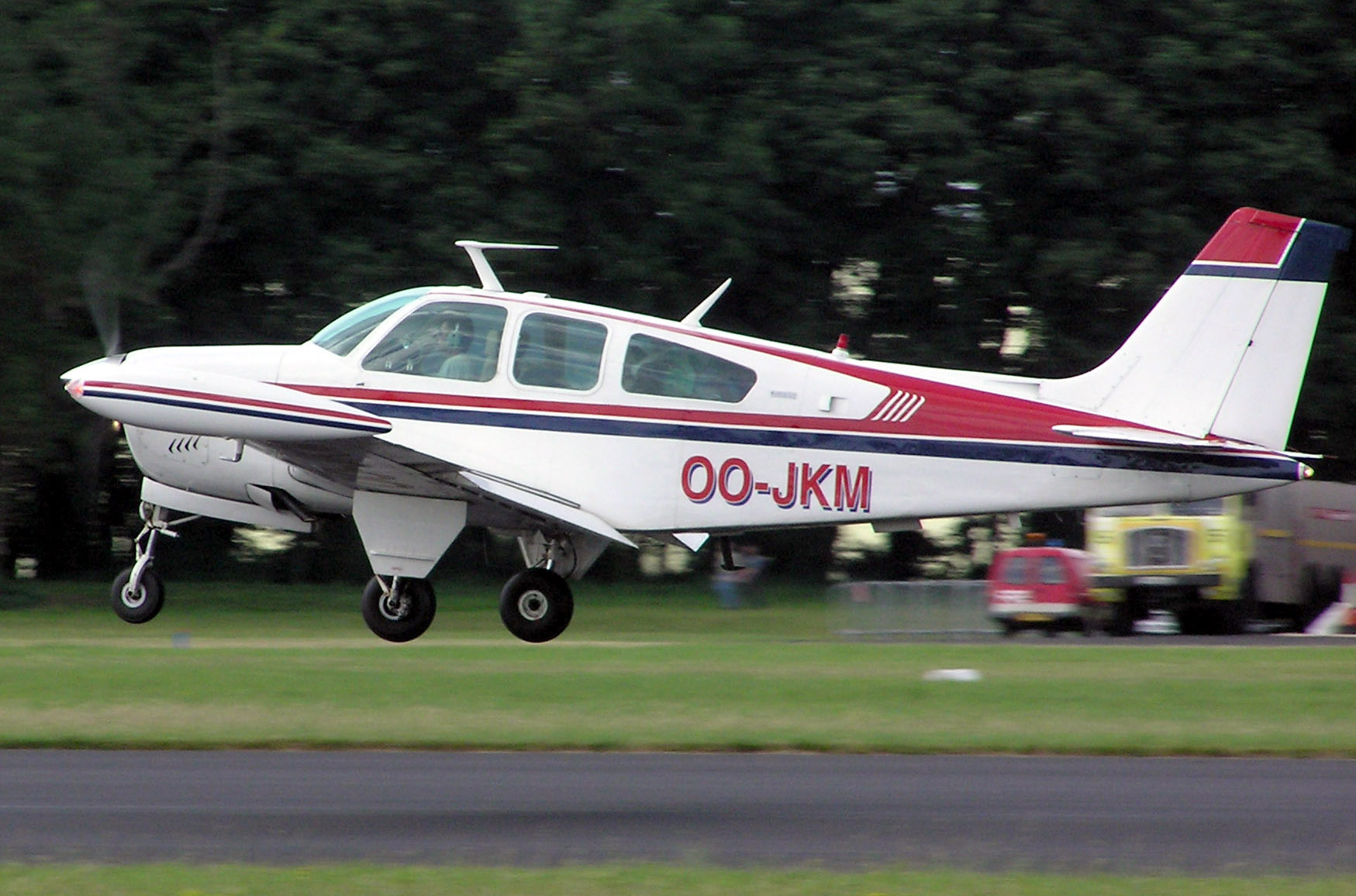
A 1974 built Beech Bonanza, registered in Belgium as OO-JKM, seen here in 2005

Belgian owned and operated aircraft are identified by either registration letters or serial numbers for military aircraft.

== Civil aircraft ==
An aircraft registration is a unique alphanumeric string that identifies a civil aircraft, in similar fashion to a licence plate on an automobile. In accordance with the Convention on International Civil Aviation all aircraft must be registered with a national aviation authority and they must carry proof of this registration in the form of a legal document called a Certificate of Registration at all times when in operation.

=== 1913 – 1928 ===
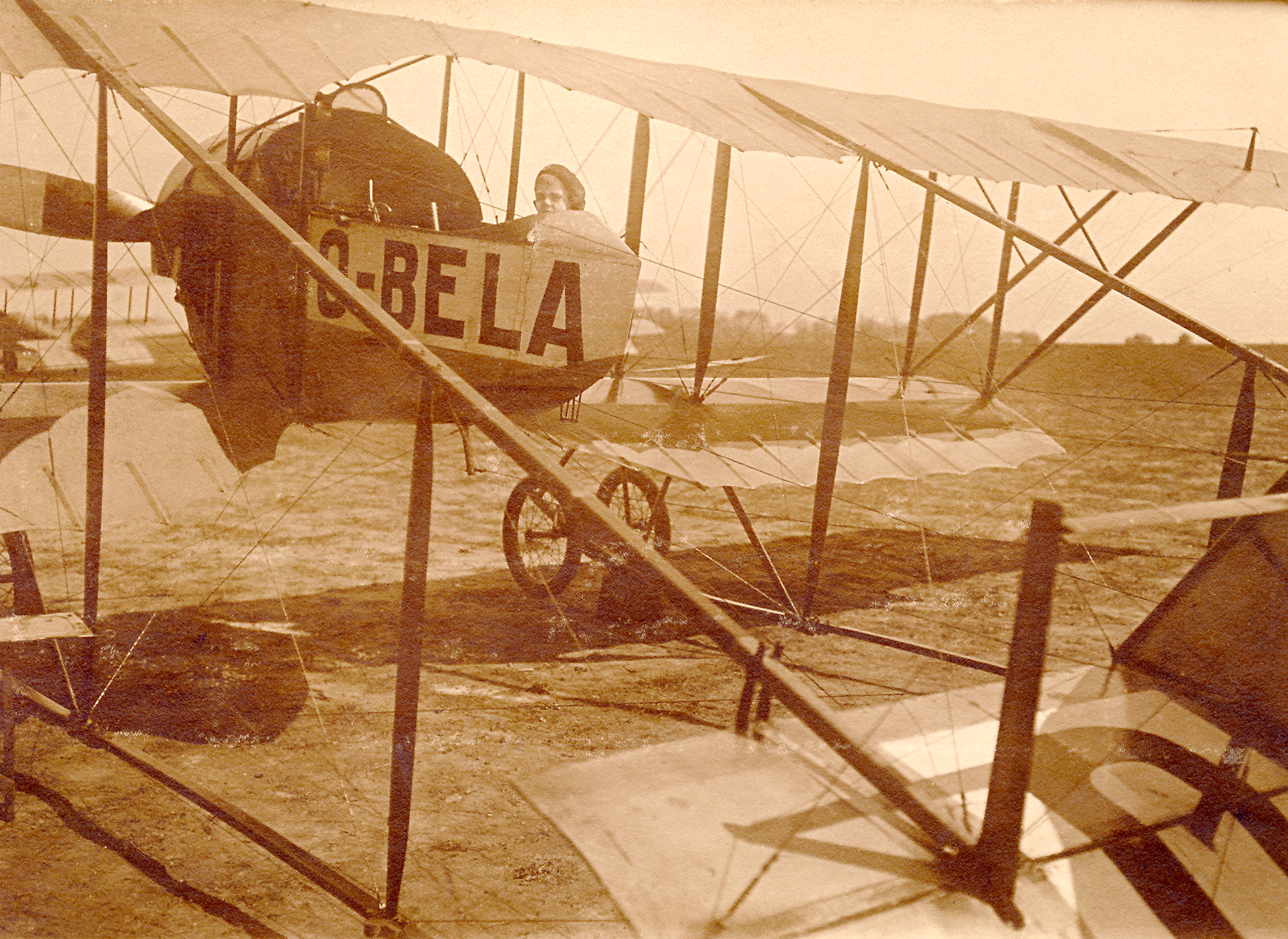
O-BELA, a Caudron G.3, 1920

The first use of aircraft registrations was based on the radio callsigns allocated at the London International Radiotelegraph Convention (1912). The format was a single letter prefix followed by four other letters (like A-BCDE). The major nations operating aircraft were allocated a single letter prefix but minor countries had to share a single letter prefix but were allocated exclusive use of the first letter of the suffix. Belgium was not considered a major operator of aircraft and was allocated the prefix and first letter suffix O-B. When the conference allocated the same prefix it made sure that they were in different parts of the world, the other user of the O prefix was Peru and they were allocated O-P. The first allocation was O-BEBE to a Fokker D.VII on 1 March 1920.

=== 1929 – current ===
At the 1927 International Radio-Telegraph Conference, new radio callsigns were allocated to Belgium, comprising ON, OO, OP, OQ, OR, OS and OT. In 1928 the International Convention of Air Navigation re-allocated the aircraft registration prefix to align with these radio callsigns. Belgium could use all or any letter groups that had been allocated as radio callsigns and in 1929 the prefix OO- was selected for civilian aircraft, while a number of Belgian military aircraft have used the prefix OT-. On 1 March 1929 a number of existing civilian aircraft were migrated across to the new register, many retaining much of their earlier registration; for instance the Caudron C.27 previously registered O-BAFW became OO-AFW.

Registrations are sometimes re-cycled. One of the first aircraft on the revised register was OO-AJT, initially allocated to a Stampe et Vertongen RSV.26/100 in March 1929. This same registration was used again from 1952 on a Miles M.14 Hawk Trainer III, and re-issued for a third time in 1958 on a Zlin Z.226T Trener.

=== Use ===
Some of the blocks of registrations have had a reserved usage and these include:

- OO-BAA to OO-BZZ used mainly for balloons
- OO-CAA to OO-CZZ used for the Belgian Congo 1934-1960
- OO-YAA to OO-ZZZ used mainly for gliders
- OO-01 to OO-499 used for homebuilt aircraft

== Belgian Congo ==
The Belgian Government issued registration for civil aircraft used in the Belgian Congo and from April 1934 used OO-CAA to OO-CZZ. The allocation ceased in 1960 with independence and the allocation of the prefix 9Q.

== Military aircraft ==
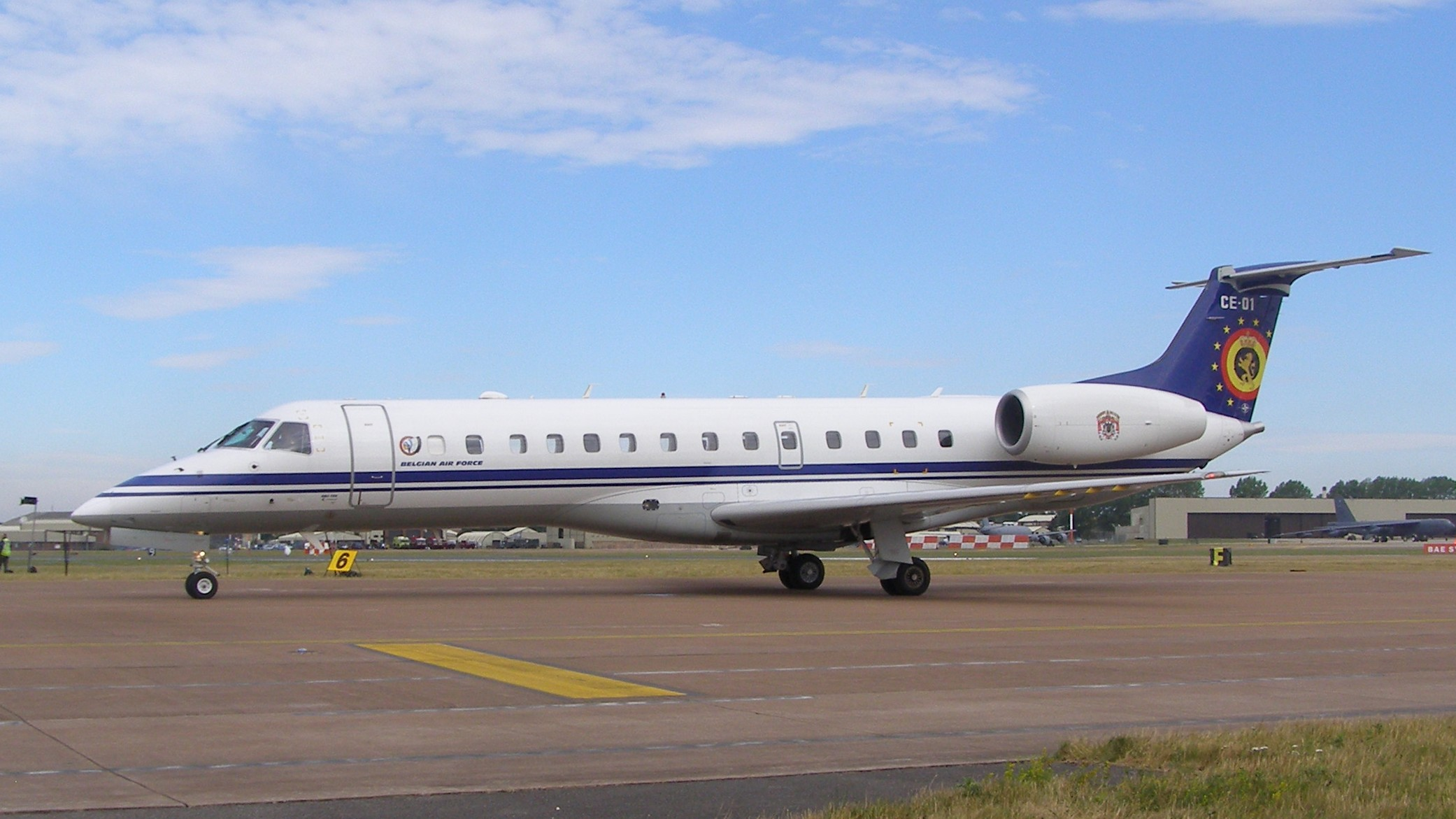
CE-01 an Embraer 135 in 2010

=== Belgian Air Force ===
When the Belgian Air Force was re-formed in 1946 individual aircraft were allocated serial numbers in either a one or two letter prefix followed by a one or two digit number. The first allocations were mainly single letters (for example A-1 was an Auster AOP.6) but sometimes a second letter was used to distinguish variants, for example NA-1 was an Avro Anson I and NB-1 was an Anson II.

Designation	Aircraft	Notes
A-	Auster AOP.6	
C-	Airspeed Consul	
C	de Havilland Canada Chipmunk	
D	de Havilland Dominie	
G	Miles Magister	
H	North American Harvard	
K	Douglas Dakota	Some aircraft temporary used KP- for photography, KFC- reconnaissance and KR- for VIP transport
O	Airspeed Oxford	
P	Percival Proctor	
T	de Havilland Tiger Moth	
V	Stampe-Vertongen SV.4	SV-4B and SV-4C
ED	Gloster Meteor T.7	
EF	Gloster Meteor F.4	
EG	Gloster Meteor F.8	
EN	Gloster Meteor NF.11	
ID	Hawker Hunter F.4	
IF	Hawker Hunter F.6	
MA	de Havilland Mosquito TT.3	
MB	de Havilland Mosquito NF.30	
MC	de Havilland Mosquito TT6	
NA	Avro Anson 1	
NB	Avro Anson 12	
SG	Supermarine Spitfire XIV	
SM	Supermarine Spitfire IX	

In the 1950s the first letter started to be used as a role prefix, for example FX-01 was a Lockheed F-104G Starfighter classified as a Fighter.

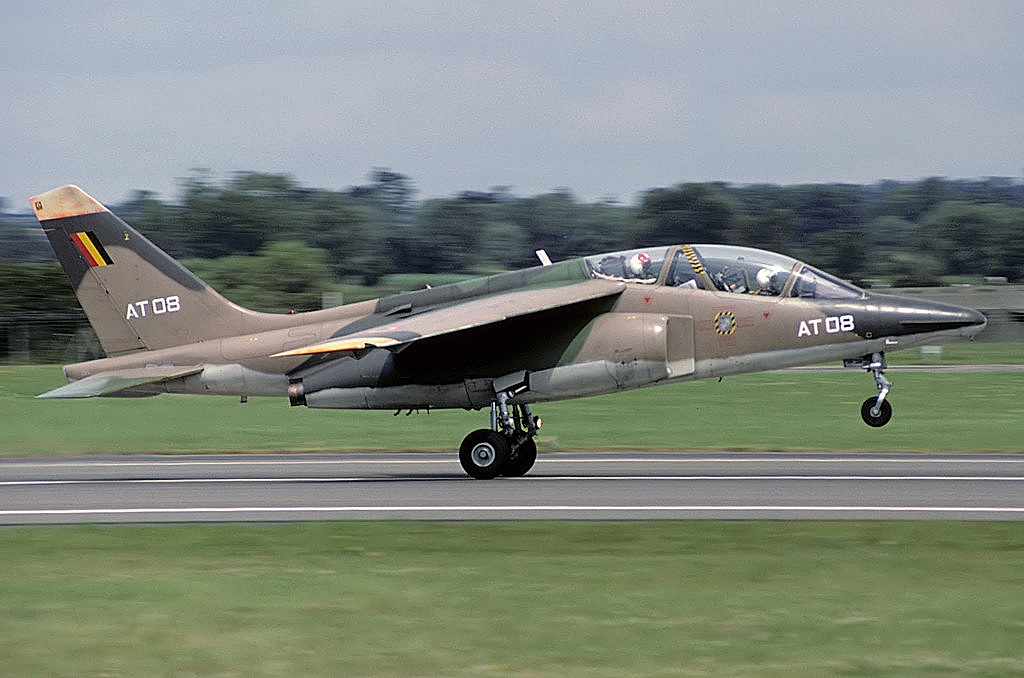
Dassault-Dornier Alpha Jet 1B, serial AT-08

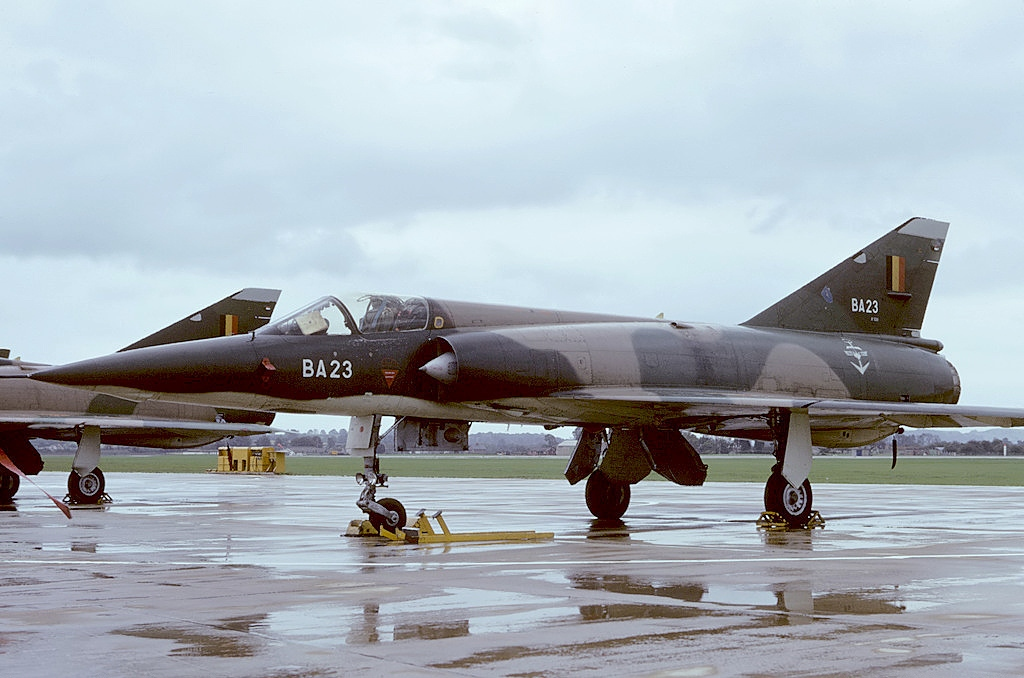
Dassault (SABCA) Mirage 5BA, serial BA-23

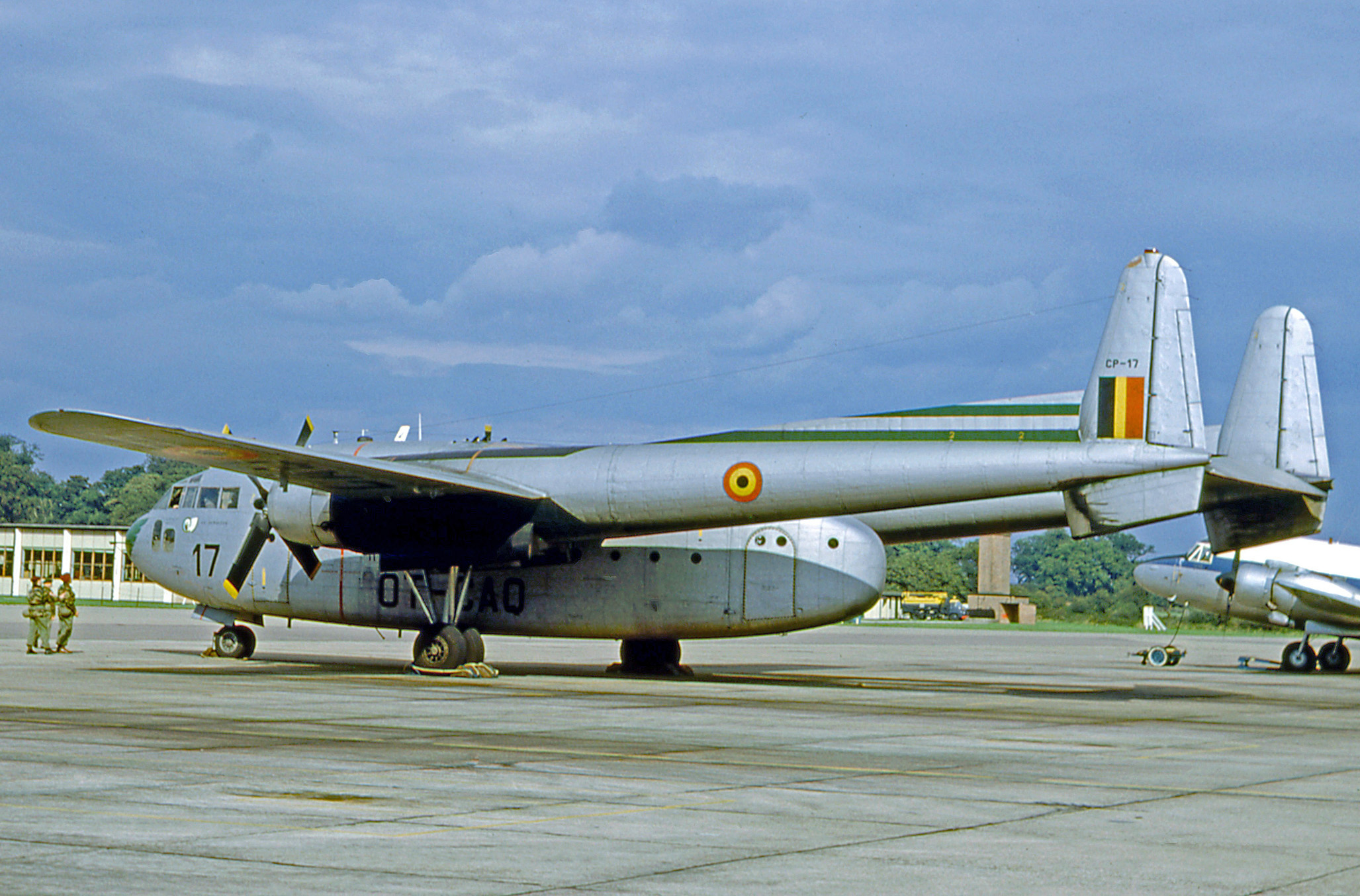
Fairchild C-119G CP-17, also displaying radio callsign OT-CAQ

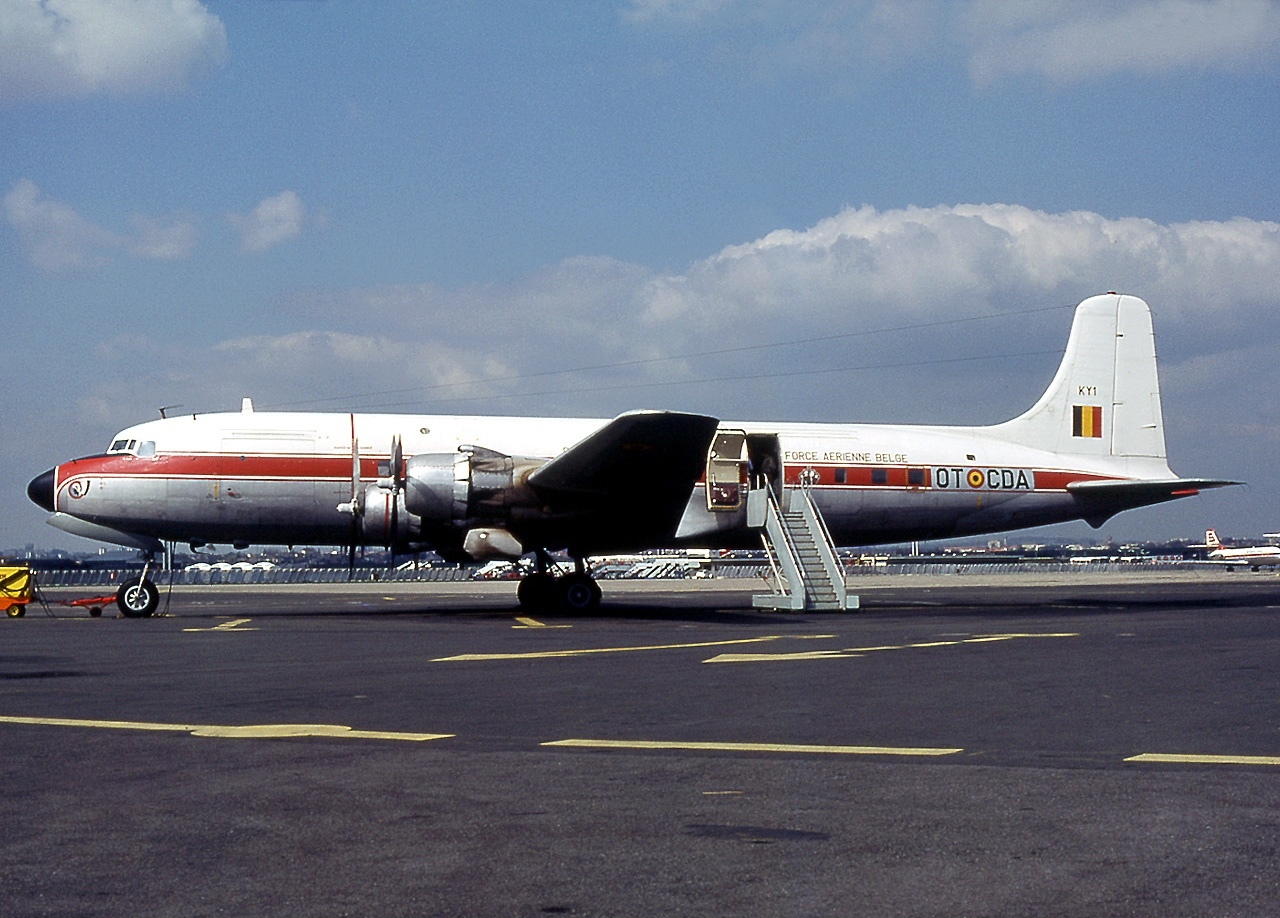
Douglas DC-6A, serial KY-1, also displaying radio callsign OT-CDA

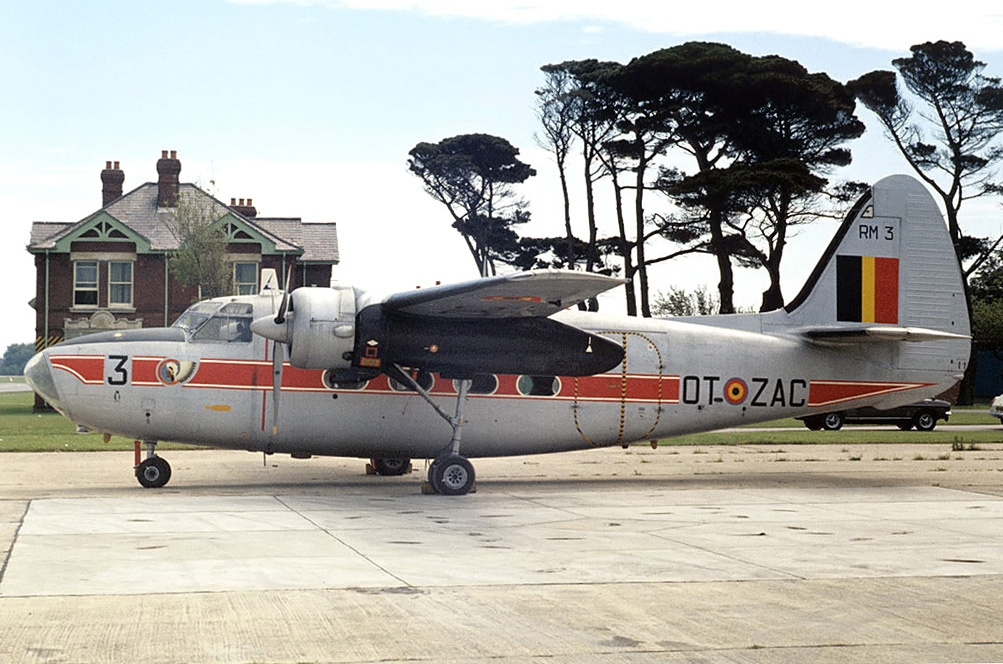
Percival Pembroke, serial RM-3, also displaying radio callsign OT-ZAC

Designation	Aircraft	Notes
AT	Dornier-Dassault Alpha Jet	
AX	Avro-Canada CF-100	
BA	Dassault Mirage 5BA	First aircraft used the serial MA-01 later changed to BA-01
BD	Dassault Mirage 5BD	First aircraft used the serial MD-01 later changed to BD-01
BR	Dassault Mirage 5BR	
CA	Airbus A310	
CB	Boeing 727	
CD	Dassault Falcon 900	
CE	Embraer 135	
CF	Swearingen Merlin III	
CH	Lockheed C-130 Hercules	
CM	Dassault Falcon 20	
CP	Fairchild C-119 Flying Boxcar	
CS	Hawker Siddeley 748	
CT	Airbus A400M Atlas	15th Air Transport Wing, Melsbroek Air Base (since October 2020)
FA	General Dynamics F-16A	
FB	General Dynamics F-16B	
FC	Lockheed TF-104G Starfighter	
FR	Republic RF-84F Thunderflash	
FS	Republic F-84E Thunderjet	
FT	Lockheed T-33A	
FU	Republic F-84F Thunderstreak	
FX	Lockheed F-104G Starfighter	
FZ	Republic F-84G Thunderjet	
KX	Douglas DC-4	
KY	Douglas DC-6	
LB	Piper Super Cub	L-21B air cadet glider tugs
MT	Fouga Magister	
RM	Percival Pembroke	
RS	Westland Sea King	
ST	SIAI SF.260	

An Aero Commander 560F was operated for royal flights between 1961 and 1973 without a serial number but display its radio callsign OT-CWB instead. Similarly, there have been Douglas C-47B transports "registered" OT-CWA, OT-CWG and OT-CNR, and a Sikorsky S-58 helicopter "registered" OT-ZKP.

=== Belgian Army ===
In 1954 the Belgian Army formed its own aviation element and serial numbers were allocated in the form OL-A01, the OL for Observation Leger (light observation), the letter for the type and the number for each individual aircraft. In 1974 the OL prefix was dropped.

Designation	Aircraft	Notes
A	Sud Alouette II	
B	Britten-Norman Islander	
D	Dornier Do 27	
G	Aerospatiale Puma	
H	Agusta A.109	
L	Piper Super Cub	L-18C

=== Belgian Navy ===
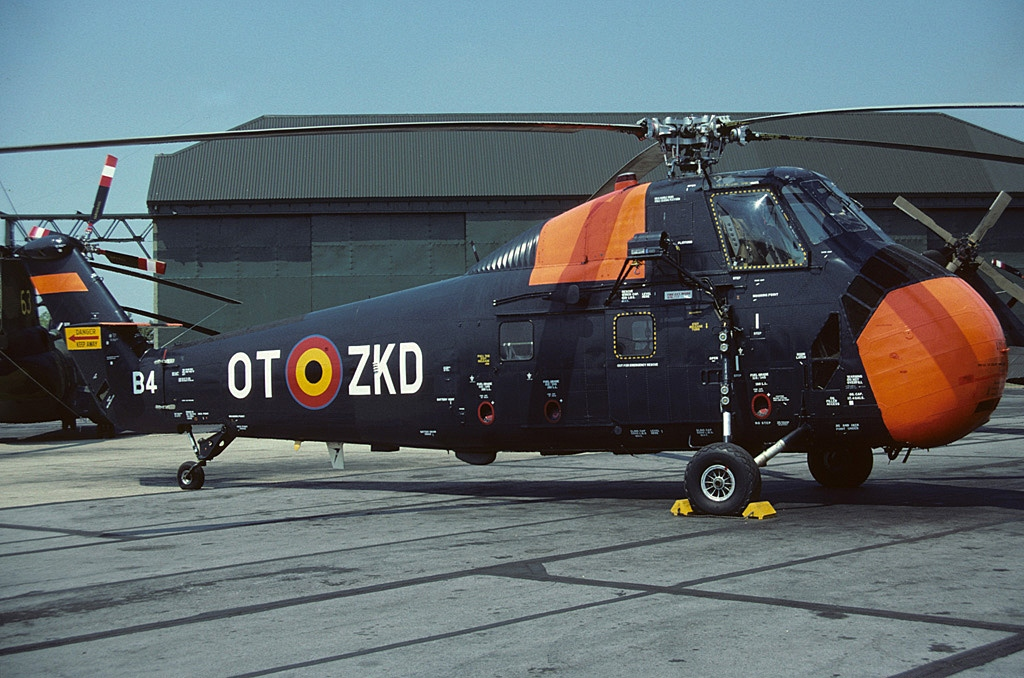
Sikorsky (Sud) S-58A, serial B4, also displaying radio-callsign OT-ZKD

The Belgian Navy have operated a number of shipborne helicopters which were allocated serials with single letter prefix although the radio callsigns were also painted on the aircraft in a similar format to registrations.

Designation	Aircraft	Notes
B	Sikorsky S-58	
M	Sud Alouette III	

== Police ==
The Belgian Rijkswacht/Gendarmerie and later the Federal Police have operated both fixed-wing aircraft and helicopters which carry serial numbers prefixed G with individual aircraft identified by increasing numbers. The first was an Aerospatiale Puma registered as G01.
