= Zacco =

Zacco may refer to:

- Zacco (fish), a genus of cyprinid fishes
- Zacco (dynasty), a Sicilian aristocratic family
- Ateliers de Construction Aéronautique de Zeebrugge, a Belgian aircraft manufacturer
