= Stampe et Vertongen RSV.26/100 =

RSV.26/100, RSV.18/100, RSV.26/18, and SV-18
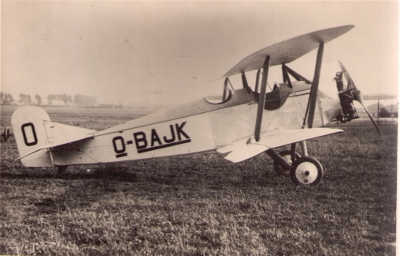

General information
- Type: touring aircraft
- National origin: Belgium
- Manufacturer: Stampe et Vertongen, Gates Aircraft
- Designer: Alfred Renard
- Number built: 11

History
- First flight: 1928

The Stampe et Vertongen RSV.26/100, RSV.18/100, RSV.26/18, and SV.18 were a family of two-seat touring aircraft designed by Alfred Renard and built by Stampe et Vertongen in Belgium in the 1920s and under license by Gates Aircraft in the United States as the Gates Convertiplane. Originally designed as a biplane, a monoplane version soon followed, and the aircraft was eventually marketed as convertible between the two configurations. Sometimes described as a lightened version of the RSV.26/140 military trainer, the RSV.26/100 was actually a fresh design.

== Design and development ==
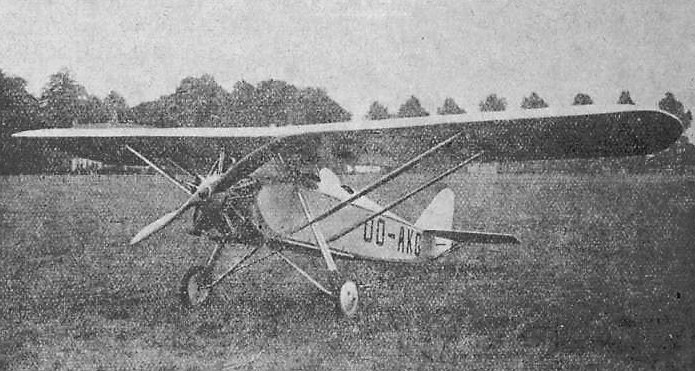
Stampe et Vertongen RSV.18/100 photo from Annuaire de L'Aéronautique 1931

In 1928, Stampe et Vertongen contracted Alfred Renard to design an aircraft with which the firm could compete in the emerging touring aircraft market, which in Belgium was dominated by British types. His response was a conventional, single-bay biplane with staggered wings of equal span. The pilot and passenger sat in tandem open cockpits and power was provided by a radial engine in the nose. The fixed undercarriage consisted of main units braced to one another, and a skid to support the tail. At the time, Stampe et Vertongen designated their aircraft with two numbers: the wing area (measured in square metres) and the engine power (measured in horsepower). Renard's new design had a wing area of 26 m^{2} and was to be powered by a 75 kW (100 hp) Renard Type 100 and was therefore designated RSV.26/100. Two years previously, the firm had introduced a training biplane for the Belgian Air Force that also had a wing area of 26 m^{2} (280 sq ft); powered by a 75 kW (100 hp) engine, it had been designated the RSV.26/140. The similar designations caused confusion in the aviation press, but Renard insisted that the RSV.26/140 and RSV.26/100 were two distinct aircraft.

With monoplanes becoming more popular, Stampe et Vertongen considered the possibility of marketing a version of the RSV.26/100 in this configuration. Renard was able to realise this design by removing the lower pair of wings and bracing the upper pair of wings to the fuselage with two struts on each side. The resulting aircraft, having lost 8 m^{2} of wing area, was now designated the RSV.18/100. The monoplane version was a little faster than the biplane, but climbed a little more slowly. With the differences between the two configurations so minimal that one could be converted to the other within one hour, Stampe et Vertongen decided to market the type as a convertible, the RSV.26/18.

At the time, Wright Tuttle Motors was negotiating a license to build the Renard Type 100 engine in the United States. The firm also purchased an RSV.26/100 and exported it, where it came to the attention of their client, Ivan R. Gates. Gates was an exponent of light aviation and was so interested in the type that he not only purchased the first RSV.26/18, but a few weeks later, bought a license to produce it in the United States. Gates established a factory at Long Island and had engineer Nathan F. Vanderlip redesign the fuselage to change it from wooden construction to steel-tube construction. However, only two aircraft were built before the Wall Street crash of 1929 ruined the company and Gates himself, who committed suicide as a result. Three or four fuselages survived, one of which was used as a chicken coop as recently as 1975.

The onset of the Great Depression also halted Stampe et Vertongen's production of the type. After George Ivanow joined the firm, he made one final attempt to market the design, modifying the RSV.18/100 (OO-AKG) to use a de Havilland Gipsy III engine and rebuilding the fuselage and empennage along similar lines to the SV.4. Marketed first as the SV.18M (Modification) tourer, then further modified and marketed as the SV.18MA (Modification Armée) fighter-trainer, no further production ensued.

== Variants ==
RSV.26/100
biplane version with Renard Type 100 engine (5 built)
RSV.18/100
monoplane version with Renard Type 100 engine (1 built)

RSV.18/105
monoplane version with Cirrus Hermes engine (1 built)
SV.18M
monoplane with de Havilland Gipsy III engine (1 converted from RSV.18/100)
SV.18MA
militarised SV.18M (1 converted)

RSV.26/18
convertible version with Renard Type 100 engine (2 built)

Gates Convertiplane
American variant of RSV.26/18 with Renard Type 100 engine and fuselage of steel tube construction (2 built)

== Specifications (RSV.26/100) ==
Data from Jouhaut 1999, p.58

General characteristics

- Crew: 1 pilot
- Capacity: 1 passenger
- Length: 7.10 m (23 ft 3 in)
- Wingspan: 9.36 m (30 ft 8 in)
- Height: 2.73 m (8 ft 11 in)
- Wing area: 26 m^{2} (280 sq ft)
- Empty weight: 484 kg (1,060 lb)
- Gross weight: 747 kg (1,640 lb)
- Powerplant: 1 × Renard Type 100 , 75 kW (100 hp)

Performance

- Maximum speed: 168 km/h (104 mph, 90 kn)
- Range: 640 km (400 mi, 350 nmi)
- Service ceiling: 4,600 m (15,000 ft)
- Rate of climb: 6.0 m/s (1,000 ft/min)
