= Nicolas Florine =

Russian inventor (1891–1972)

Nicolas Florine (born Nikolay Anatolyevich Florin; Russian: Николай Анатольевич Флорин; 19 July 1891 in Batum, Kutais Governorate, Russian Empire – 21 January 1972 in Brussels, Belgium) was a Russian-born engineer who settled in Belgium. He built the first tandem rotor helicopter in 1927 — a flying scale model and full size helicopter was built in 1933.

== Biography ==
Nicolas Florine was born to Anatole Victorovich Florin (1856–1936) and Aimee Lioubov (1862–1935) and had a sister Olga (born 30 October 1893) and a brother Victor Anatolyevich Florin (7 December 1899 – 1960). He spent his childhood and youth in St. Petersburg, to which his parents had moved in the early 20th century. There, he studied mathematics at the university. He completed his military service in 1914. After the advent of the Bolshevik Revolution of 1917, Florine took refuge in Germany before returning to the Soviet Union. His family background (of minor Russian nobility) and his status as an engineer trained under the Tsar put him under threat from the communists, from which he fled by raft across the Gulf of Finland to a refugee camp in Helsinki before settling in Belgium in 1920, the only country (of the 26 to which he applied) to accept his asylum application.

Nicolas Florine worked at l'Administration de l'aéronautique, based in the buildings of the Hotel des Monnaies in Saint-Gilles (Brussels). In 1926 he was responsible for initiating the Centre d'aérodynamisme located in Rhode-Saint-Genèse, on the outskirts of Brussels, whose first director was Professor Émile Allard. He was involved in the creation of Belgium's first wind tunnel, together with the initiators, Alfred Renard and Emile Allard. From wind tunnel installations there the Stampe SV.4, by Jean Stampe, a school and acrobatics aircraft used in Belgium, France and many other countries, was begun, as well as the prototype Alfred Renard R.35 tri-motor pressurized airliner. Today, the center has been renamed as the 'von Karman Institute for Fluid Dynamics'.

The studies Florine performed here in 1926 led to patents related to helicopter control and in particular how to counteract the torque resulting from using two rotors. The results of the studies were published in the article Eléments du calcul de stabilité d'un hélicoptère. Herein, the principle was described of a helicopter with two rotors. These rotors turned in the same direction, in contrast to the current tandem helicopters. In order to counteract the torque, the rotors were angled inwards at 7 to 10° from the vertical. This publication formed the basis of all his designs that would follow.

In 1927 Nicolas Florine received financial support from the Belgian airline SNETA and the Fonds National de la Recherche Scientifique for the development of a helicopter. This resulted in three prototypes.

== The helicopters ==
The first was built in 1927 and made its first flight in 1929. Nicolas Florine built a helicopter with two rotors in tandem, turning in the same direction. To balance the reaction torques, he used his principle of inclining the axes of rotation of the rotors with respect to each other. After the implementation of scale models, one of which weighed 36 kg and left the ground several times, he built a first device (the "Type I") able to carry a pilot, propelled by a Hispano-Suiza water-cooled engine of 180 CV. In 1930 it was partially destroyed during a static trial following a failure in its mechanical transmission.

The pioneer gave the following description:

The axis of the engine was horizontal, and instead of the hub of the propeller, a universal joint was fitted coupling connecting the engine to the clutch; the latter was friction on multiple discs and springs. A first angled transmission via a bevel gear, and a vertical upright shaft followed the clutch. At the upper end of the vertical shaft was fixed a cooling fan blowing on the water radiator placed immediately below. At the same height as the radiator, there was a second bevel gear which conveyed the rotation of the vertical shaft to the horizontal transmission shafts; These led to the hubs of the propellers.

In 1931 a second, lighter, design was built, and baptized "Type II". This was largely built at Sociéte Anonyme Avions et Moteurs Renard. It was equipped with an air-cooled 240-hp Renard engine with a vertical axis. Like its predecessor, the Type II was equipped with two tandem rotors (one at the front and one at the rear) rotating in the same direction. In order to balance the reaction torques, the axes of rotation of the rotors were inclined about 7° on either side of the longitudinal axis of the fuselage, laterally (one to the left and the other to the right). Its chassis, made of welded steel tubes, gave it a total working weight of 950 kg, i.e. 60% of the weight of the Type I wooden fuselage.

The aircraft was equipped with magnesium alloy 'elephant legs' as landing gear. This model made many test flights, and eventually set an unofficial record flight duration of 9 minutes and 58 seconds. The flights began on April 12, 1933, and on October 25 of the same year, near the beech forest of Soignes, the aircraft piloted by Mr. Robert Collin, engineer at the Belgian Aeronautics Technical Service, officially beat the record for time in the air of 9 min 58 s. A few months later, in 1934, when tested in Haren the team tried to beat the record of altitude of 18 meters realized in Rome by the machine designed by Ascanio. During the attempt, there was a malfunction of one of the clutches of the transmission, which unbalanced the device which turned and crashed. Robert Collin, very well protected, got away without a scratch. The Florine II made more than thirty test flights between April 1933 and May 1934.

A third model was then built, this time with a twin-engine configuration. The fuselage was lighter while the two Salmson 60 hp engines were placed at the front on either side of the fuselage. The blades of the rotors were folded when stationary. The first flight was made by Collin on 15 September 1936 and tests were carried out until the autumn of 1937. However, the results were disappointing, especially in comparison with the prototype Florine II. In 1937, further development stopped. This helicopter was destroyed during World War II.

== Later years ==
The onset of World War II, with the cost of national rearmament, deprived Florine of a budget. Robert Collin went to the Belgian Congo in 1938 to work in civil engineering until his retirement in 1967. Florine worked on a quadrirotor project until 1949 and remained attached to the Service technique de l'aéronautique (STAé) until his retirement In 1956. He died in Brussels in 1972, aged 81 years.

Nicolas Florine is also known to have devised a system of three lenses coupled to three filters allowing the superposition of colored images. This principle was developed in the 1930s for the projection of films in relief.

An area in the Air and Space section of the Royal Museum of the Army and Military History in Brussels is reserved for Florine; it presents documents (photos, plans, drawings, etc.) as well as a complete wind-tunnel model (scale 1/5) of the Florine IV project, his quadrirotor.

== Bibliography ==
- Alphonse Dumoulin, Les hélicoptères Florine, 1920-1950 : la Belgique à l'avant-garde de la giraviation, Fonds national Alfred Renard, Bruxelles, 1999
- André Hauet, Les avions Renard, Brussels, Éditions AELR, 1984
- Jean Boulet, Histoire de l’hélicoptère racontée par ses pionniers 1907–1956, France-Empire, 1991 (ISBN 978-2-7048-0676-8)
- Ivàn FLORINE, 'L'Explorair', 2011
