= Stampe et Vertongen SV.5 Tornado =

SV.5 Tornado
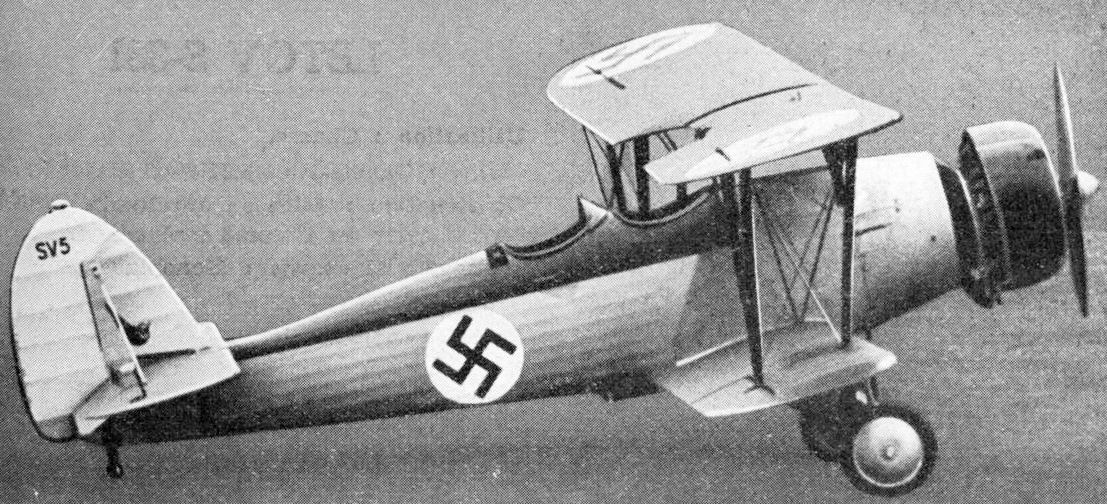
- A Latvian Air Force SV.5

General information
- Type: Military trainer
- National origin: Belgium
- Manufacturer: Stampe et Vertongen
- Designer: George Ivanow
- Primary user: Belgian Air Force
- Number built: 31, plus one SV.9

History
- First flight: September 1933

The Stampe et Vertongen SV.5 Tornado was a military trainer aircraft designed and built in Belgium in the 1930s. It saw service with the Belgian Air Force and Latvian Air Force, and Latvian firm VEF purchased a production license, although it is uncertain whether it built any examples.

== Design and development ==
The SV.5 was Stampe et Vertongen's response to a 1933 requirement by the Belgian Air Force for a two-seat training biplane with aerobatic capabilities. Jean Stampe directed designer George Ivanow to update the company's RSV.22 to meet the new specifications, but the resulting design was an entirely new aircraft with only a superficial resemblance to its predecessor. It was a conventional, single-bay biplane with staggered wings of unequal span. The pilot and instructor sat in open cockpits in tandem and the aircraft was powered by an Armstrong Siddeley Serval radial engine in the nose, enclosed in a Townend ring. The main units of the fixed undercarriage were divided and the tail was supported by a tailwheel. It could be equipped for bombing or gunnery training. Unlike earlier Stampe et Vertongen products, which had wooden structures, the SV.5 airframe was riveted together from steel tube in a method inspired by Hawker in the United Kingdom.

The prototype first flew in September 1933, and on 16 October 1934, the Belgian Air Force evaluated it against five competitors: the Avro 626, Breda Ba.25, Fairey Fox III, LACAB T-7, and the Renard R.34. A sixth competitor, the Caproni Ca.113, suffered an accident on arrival and was disqualified. The SV.5 outclassed all its rivals in the maintainability trials, and was less expensive than any of them. However, the Avro 626 was selected for political reasons.

The SV.5 nevertheless found a customer in the Latvian Air Force, which was seeking a similar aircraft. When a study mission to Belgium confirmed the type's suitability, the Latvian government negotiated the purchase of ten examples in exchange for 5,700 tonnes of wheat. These machines were slightly different from the prototype, with a NACA cowl in place of the Townend ring, a redesigned horizontal stabiliser, and simplified main undercarriage. Germany would not permit the overflight of the aircraft, so in September 1936 they were shipped disassembled to Riga, where Jean Stampe oversaw their assembly by VEF.

In the meantime, the Belgian Air Force finally placed an order for twenty SV.5s. Stampe et Vertongen delivered these between October 1936 and mid 1937.

== Variants ==
Ivanow used the SV.5 as the basis for a family of follow-on designs with only minor variations:

SV.6
version with 260-kW (350-hp) Armstrong Siddeley Cheetah IX
SV.7
version with 378-kW (507-hp) Pratt & Whitney Wasp Junior, also with spoilers under the upper wing
SV.8
version with 180-kW (240-hp) Armstrong Siddeley Lynx IV
SV.9
SV.5 with metal, variable-pitch propeller, and upper wings moved 2 cm (1 in) rearward to improve centre of gravity

Of these, only a single SV.9 was built. This aircraft was exported to Latvia, together with a license for production by VEF. Although rumours exist that VEF built examples of the type, this cannot be confirmed.

== Operators ==
Belgium

- Belgian Air Force (20)

Latvia

- Latvian Air Force (10)

== Specifications (SV.5) ==
Data from Jouhaud 1999, p.86

General characteristics

- Crew: two
- Length: 8.04 m (26 ft 4 in)
- Wingspan: 10.52 m (34 ft 6 in)
- Height: 3.04 m (10 ft 0 in)
- Wing area: 26.7 m^{2} (287 sq ft)
- Empty weight: 890 kg (1,960 lb)
- Gross weight: 1,340 kg (2,950 lb)
- Powerplant: 1 × Armstrong Siddeley Cheetah X , 250 kW (340 hp)

Performance

- Maximum speed: 272 km/h (151 mph, 131 kn)
- Endurance: 3 hours 30 minutes
- Service ceiling: 7,150 m (23,500 ft)
