= Vertongen =

Vertongen may refer to:

- Lee Vertongen (born 1975), New Zealand cyclist
- Stampe et Vertongen, Belgian aircraft manufacturer

== See also ==
- Jan Vertonghen (born 1987), Belgian footballer
