= Edmond Thieffry =

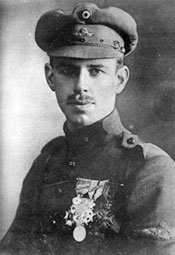
- Born: 28 September 1892; Etterbeek, Brussels, Belgium
- Died: 11 April 1929 (aged 36) nr. Lake Tanganyika, Belgian Congo
- Cause of death: Air crash
- Known for: First Brussels-Leopoldville flight
- Aviation career
- First flight: 1915; Farman
- Air force: Belgian Air Component
- Battles: World War I
- Rank: Lieutenant

Edmond Thieffry (French pronunciation: [ɛdmɔ̃ tjɛfʁi]; 28 September 1892 – 11 April 1929) was a Belgian First World War air ace and aviation pioneer. He made, with Léopold Roger and Jef de Bruycker, the first successful flight between Belgium and Congo (then the Belgian Congo).

== Early life ==
Thieffry was born in Etterbeek, a municipality of Brussels, in 1892 and went on to study law at the Catholic University of Leuven (hence his nickname "The Flying Judge"). After qualifying he was conscripted into the Belgian Army, joining the 10th Line Regiment in 1913.

== First World War ==
During the German invasion of Belgium in 1914, he saw service as a staff attaché to General Gérard Leman, but was captured by the Germans. He escaped on a stolen motorcycle to the neutral territory of the Netherlands, where he was arrested by Dutch military police. Using his legal knowledge and Dutch language skills he managed to talk his way out of internment, and travelled to Antwerp to rejoin the Belgian army.

In 1915, Thieffry joined the Compagnie des Ouvriers et Aérostiers —the Belgian Army Air Corps— and with some difficulty qualified as a pilot at Étampes. On 1 February 1916, he joined the 3rd Squadron as an observer for artillery, where he was appreciated for his exactitude and courage. He crash-landed so many aircraft that he was promptly assigned to a single-seat fighter squadron, as no one would fly with him. He was rapidly transferred to the 5th Squadron (The Comets) under Captain Jules Dony, based at De Panne in December 1916.

His first confirmed victory was on 15 March 1917, flying a Nieuport 11. His second followed eight days later above Gistel, and his third on 12 May above Houthulst. His fourth was on 14 June—an Albatros D.III above Westende. The 5th Squadron then relocated to Les Moëres, and was equipped with Nieuport 17s. Thieffry gained official status as an "ace" when he shot down two German fighters over Diksmuide on 3 July. In August he received the first SPAD VII fighter in the Belgian Air Force, bought by the Belgian prince. He gained three more victories with it.

On 31 August 1917, his aircraft was badly damaged by two German Albatros D.V fighters, but he managed to land behind the Belgian lines. He continued to fight and he claimed his 10th and last confirmed kill on 10 October 1917. He also had five 'probable' kills. This placed him third on the list of Belgian aces, behind Willy Coppens and André de Meulemeester. Shortly afterwards he was shot down and wounded by return fire from a German two-seater aircraft of FAA 227 over Kortrijk on 23 February 1918. He spent the rest of the war as a prisoner of war in Germany. He tried to escape on 13 April 1918 but was caught ten days later.

== Flight to Congo ==
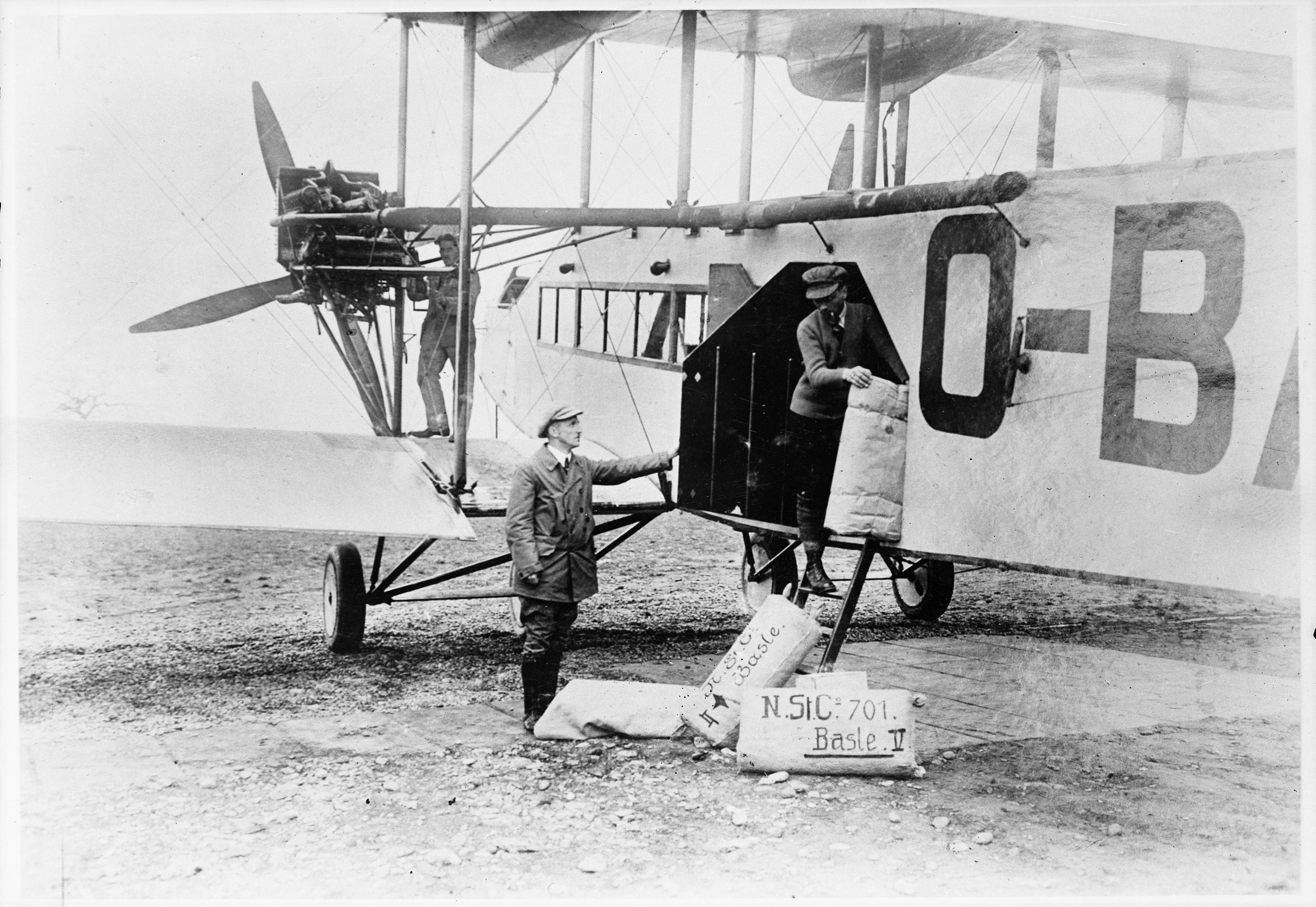
A Handley Page W.8b in the markings of Sabena, similar to the aircraft flown by Thieffry and Roger in 1925.

At the end of the war, Thieffry returned to Brussels by way of Switzerland, arriving home on 6 December 1918. He returned to his practice as a lawyer, but remained active in aviation, being one of the founders of Sabena in 1923. He then devised a plan to inaugurate an air link between Belgium and the Belgian Congo. At the start of 1925, he obtained permission from the government for this hazardous flight. Sabena supplied a Handley Page W.8f, which Thieffry named "Princesse Marie-José", after getting the support of his friend King Albert.

He left from Brussels (presumably from Haren Airport as the present national airport would only be created in 1940 at Melsbroek, its Zaventem terminal dating from 1956) on 12 February 1925, with mechanic Joseph "Jef" de Bruycker and co-pilot Léopold Roger, heading for N'Dolo airfield at Leopoldville (now Kinshasa). Thieffry himself acted as navigator. The flight plan called for stops at Marseille, Oran, Colomb-Bechar, Gao, Fort-Lamy, Bangui and Coquilhatville, and should have taken seven days. However strong adverse winds and a broken propeller meant that it took 51 days. Finally on 3 April, after 8,200 kilometres, they arrived at Leopoldville. The first air connection was made, and Thieffry returned to a hero's welcome in Belgium.

He made two further attempts to reach Congo. The first on 9 March 1928 in an ACAZ C.2 with Joseph Lang and Philippe Quersin, did not get any further than Philippeville. The second on 26 June in a Stampe et Vertongen RSV.22-180, again with Philippe Quersin, also failed, this time ending in a marsh at Clapier, near Vauvert. Thieffry then developed a plan to set up an internal air service in Congo. During his second test flight in Congo on 11 April 1929, flying Aviméta 92, Thieffry, with fellow flyer Gaston Julien, was killed in a crash close to Lake Tanganyika (only a mechanic survived). He was 36 years old. It would be another 10 years before a regular air service was established between Brussels and Kinshasa.

== Awards ==
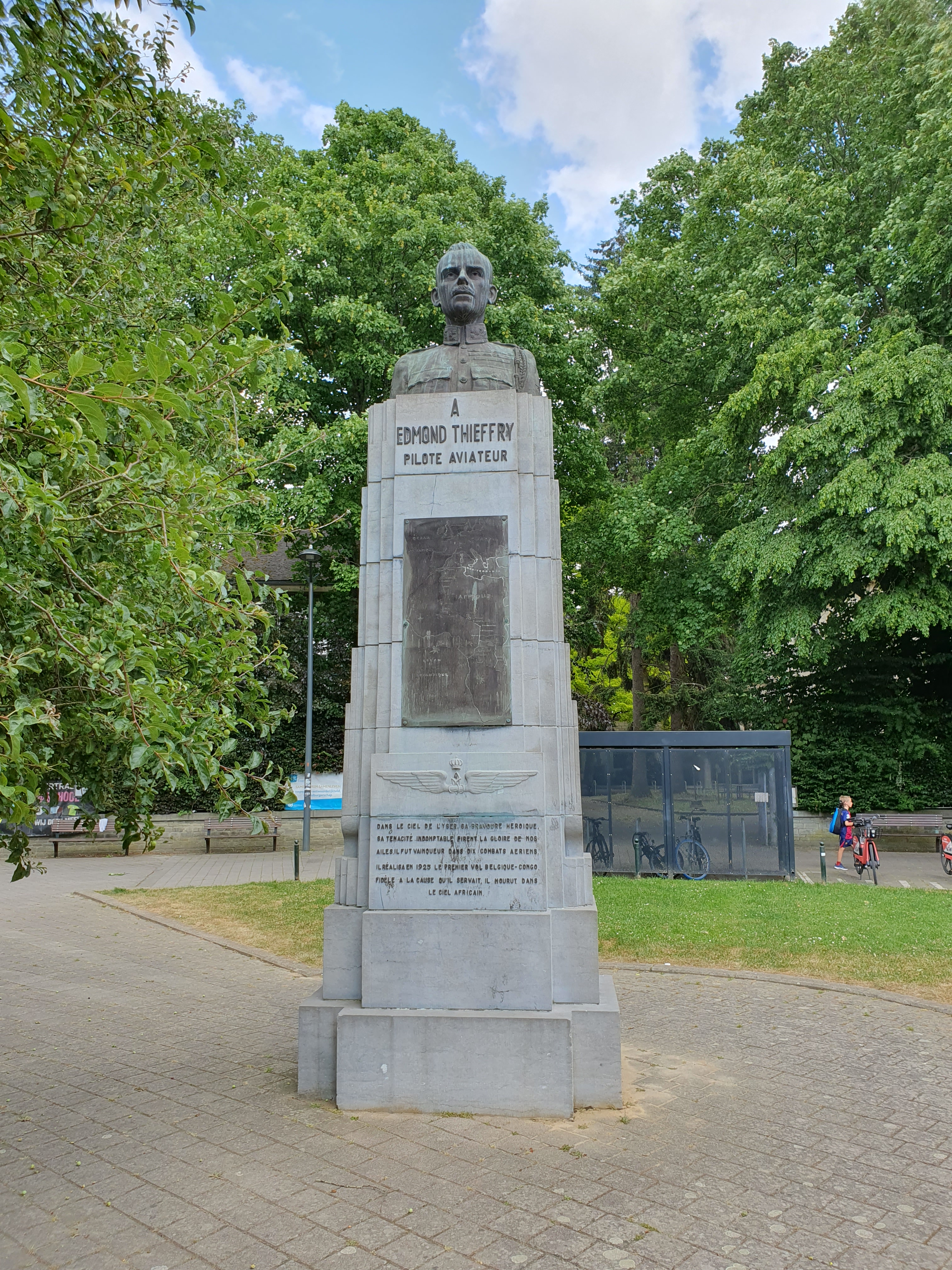
Monument dedicated to Thieffry at Etterbeek, Brussels

- Croix de Guerre (Belgium) 1914–1918
- Knight of the Order of Leopold II
- Knight of the Order of Léopold
- Croix de Guerre with Palm (France)
- Silver Medal of Military Valor (Italy)
- Victory Medal
- Commemorative Medal of the 1914–1918 War
- 7 Frontstreep (Front Line Stripes)

== Memorials ==
- On 10 July 1932 a plaque dedicated to Thieffry was unveiled in Etterbeek. It shows the route of his flight to Leopoldville. A metro station (Thieffry metro station) and a street (Rue Aviateur Thieffry / Vlieger Thieffry Straat) have also been named after him in Etterbeek.

== See also ==
- List of World War I aces from Belgium
