= Stampe et Vertongen RSV.22 =

RSV.22

General information
- Type: training biplane
- National origin: Belgium
- Manufacturer: Stampe et Vertongen
- Designer: Alfred Renard
- Primary user: Belgian Air Force

History
- First flight: 1926

The Stampe et Vertongen RSV.22 was a training biplane produced in Belgium in the 1920s.

== Design and development ==
The RSV.22 was a conventional, single-bay biplane with staggered wings of unequal span that were braced with N-struts near their tips. The fixed undercarriage consisted of two mainwheels that were joined by a common through axle, plus a tailskid. The student pilot and the instructor sat in open cockpits in tandem that were fitted with dual controls. Construction was of mixed materials, with metal used for the undercarriage, engine mount, and cabane struts. The control surfaces were operated by a rigid linkage made of dural tube. The horizontal stabilizer was adjustable in flight, using a lever in the cockpit to adjust the aircraft's trim. Incorrect use of this latter feature led to a number of accidents. The base model RSV 22/180 was powered by a 134-kW (180-hp) Hispano-Suiza engine, but the aircraft was designed to use powerplants of up to 220 kW (300 hp). The RSV 22/200 variant used a 150-kW (200-hp) Renard-built radial engine in place of the Hispano-Suiza.

The Belgian Air Force purchased 20 examples of the RSV 22/180. In 1928, Lt Edmond Thieffry and SLt Philippe Quersin piloted a civil-registered RSV 22/180 (registration O-BAJE) on an attempt at a long-distance flight to Africa. They departed Deurne on 26 June, attempting to reach Kinshasa. Bad weather forced them to land at Mourmelon, France, only 230 km (140 mi) away. Resuming their journey, they were forced down a second time, this time in a marsh at Clapier, near Vauvert, still in France. They abandoned the attempt at this point and successfully returned to Belgium.

== Variants ==
RSV.22/180
base model with 130 kW (180 hp) Hispano-Suiza engine (over 20 built)
RSV.22/200
version with 150 kW (200 hp) Renard Type 200 radial engine (1 built)
RSV.22 Titan
A version powered by a 170 kW (230 hp) Gnome-Rhône 5K 5-cyl. radial engine.
RSV.22 Lynx
A version powered by a 160 kW (215 hp) Armstrong Siddeley Lynx 5-cyl. radial engine.

== Operators ==
Belgium

- Belgian Air Force — 20 × RSV.22/180

== Specifications (RSV.22/180) ==
Data from Les avions Renard and Jane's all the World's Aircraft 1928.

General characteristics

- Crew: 2
- Length: 7.6 m (24 ft 11 in)
- Wingspan: 9.12 m (29 ft 11 in)
- Height: 2.7 m (8 ft 10 in)
- Wing area: 22 m^{2} (240 sq ft)
- Empty weight: 710 kg (1,565 lb)
- Gross weight: 965 kg (2,127 lb)
- Powerplant: 1 × Hispano-Suiza 8Ab V-8 water-cooled piston engine, 130 kW (180 hp)
- Propellers: 2-bladed wooden fixed-pitch propeller

Performance

- Maximum speed: 200 km/h (120 mph, 110 kn)
- Stall speed: 80 km/h (50 mph, 43 kn)
- Service ceiling: 6,000 m (20,000 ft)
- Time to altitude: 2,000 m (6,600 ft) in 7 minutes 20 seconds
- Wing loading: 43.5 kg/m^{2} (8.9 lb/sq ft)
- Power/mass: 7.2 kg/kW (11.8 lb/hp)

== See also ==
Related lists

- List of Interwar military aircraft

== Bibliography ==
- Wauthy, Jean-Luc & de Neve, Florian (June 1995). "Les aéronefs de la Force Aérienne Belge, deuxième partie 1919–1935" [Aircraft of the Belgian Air Force]. Le Fana de l'Aviation (in French) (305): 28–33. ISSN 0757-4169.
