= ACAZ T.2 =

General information
- Type: two seat touring aircraft
- National origin: Belgium
- Manufacturer: Ateliers de Construction Aéronautique de Zeebruges (ACAZ)
- Designer: Alfred Renard and Emile Allard
- Number built: 1 (2 including T.1)

History
- First flight: mid-1924

The ACAZ T.1 and T.2, very similar to each other, were the first Belgian all-metal aircraft, flown in 1924. They were single-engined touring monoplanes which seated two. Only two were built.

== Development ==
The first example of ACAZ's all-metal two-seater tourer, registered as the ACAZ T.1 O-BAFK, was first flown in early 1924. It was the first Belgian all-metal aircraft. Its trials went well and on 21 June it was flown to Brussels to take part in the Concours des avions de tourisme (touring aircraft contest) but in low cloud it collided with a tree and crashed; happily, there were no deaths.

There is little detail recorded specifically on the T.1 apart from a photograph but its replacement, the ACAZ T.2, was noted as du même type (of the same type). It had made several successful flights by mid-July, just a few weeks after the crash of the T.1, though it was only registered as O-BAFM on 19 December 1924.

== Design ==
The T.1 and T.2 were designed by Alfred Renard and Emile Allard. Each had a thick profile, two part, cantilever, high wing which could be rapidly detached for transport. In plan the wing was basically rectangular but with rounded leading edges at the tips. The wing was mounted with slight dihedral; its thickness was constant over most of the span but decreased over the outer parts, where its ailerons extended aft beyond the trailing edge.

The engine was a 52 kW (70 hp) Anzani 6, a six-cylinder radial engine mounted uncowled on the nose with its fuel tank behind a firewall. The fuselage was rectangular in cross-section apart from a slightly shaped roof and was built around frames and longerons with sheet metal covering. The enclosed cabin, which held two sitting side-by-side, was under the wing and had both forward and side glazing. The fuselage frame in the cabin region was strengthened; access was via a side door. At the rear the empennage was conventional, with a tailplane of the same plan as the wings, mounted on top of the fuselage. It carried broad, straight-edged elevators with a deep cut-out for movement of the tall, round-tipped rudder which was hinged from a small, triangular fin.

The fixed undercarriage had mainwheels with stub-axles on short, rigid duralumin tubes from the lower fuselage, giving a track of only 2.07 m (6 ft 9 in). The tailskid was designed to double-up as a forward hook for transport as a trailer.

== Operational history ==
Though O-BAFM remained on the registrar until 1933 there are few, if any, records of its activities in the French aviation press. No more T.2s were built, as no customers could be found.

== Specifications ==
Data from Les Ailes, July 1924

General characteristics

- Crew: One
- Capacity: One passenger
- Length: 6.20 m (20 ft 4 in)
- Wingspan: 10.50 m (34 ft 5 in)
- Height: 1.80 m (5 ft 11 in)
- Wing area: 17.50 m^{2} (188.4 sq ft)
- Aspect ratio: 6.3
- Empty weight: 320 kg (705 lb)
- Gross weight: 610 kg (1,345 lb)
- Fuel capacity: 68 L (15 imp gal; 18 US gal)
- Powerplant: 1 × Anzani 6 6-cylinder radial engine, 52 kW (70 hp)
- Propellers: 2-bladed, 2 m (6 ft 7 in) diameter

Performance

- Maximum speed: 160 km/h (99 mph, 86 kn) at ground level
- Endurance: 3.5 hr
- Landing speed: 70 km/h (43 mph)
