= Renard R.35 =

R.35
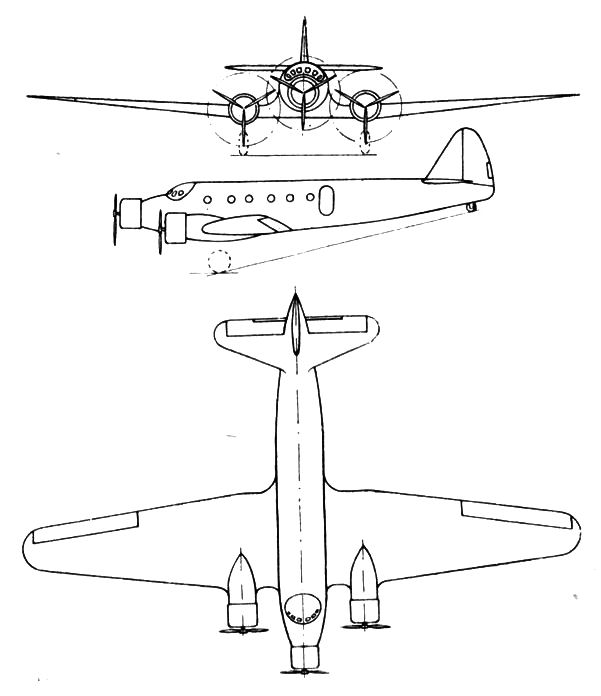

General information
- Type: Airliner
- National origin: Belgium
- Manufacturer: Renard
- Designer: Alfred Renard
- Number built: 1

History
- First flight: 1 April 1938

The Renard R.35 was a prototype pressurised airliner of the 1930s built by the Belgian aircraft manufacturer Constructions Aéronautiques G. Renard. A three-engined low-winged monoplane with retractable undercarriage, the R.35 was destroyed in a crash on its first flight.

== Development and design ==
In 1935, Alfred Renard, chief designer and co-founder of the Renard company, started design of a pressurised airliner for use by SABENA on its routes to the Belgian Congo. Renard designed a low-winged monoplane of all-metal construction, powered by three engines as required by SABENA, and received an order for a single prototype on 3 April 1936. The R.35 had a circular section fuselage, housing a pressurised cabin which accommodated twenty passengers and a flight crew of three. It was intended to be powered by a range of radial engines with the 950 hp (709 kW) Gnome-Rhône 14K preferred by Renard, but the prototype was fitted with 750 hp (560 kW) Gnome-Rhône 9K engines.

The R.35 was completed early in 1938. On 1 April 1938, it was planned to carry out high-speed taxiing trials at Evere airfield in front of an audience of visiting dignitaries and journalists. After carrying out a single taxi-run, however, the R.35 took off during a second run, and while attempting a circuit to return to the runway, the R.35 dived into the ground and was destroyed, killing the pilot Georges Van Damme. The cause of the crash was unknown. Following this crash, SABENA abandoned its interest in the R.35, and Renard abandoned development.

== Variants ==
R.35B
Proposed bomber version, capable of carrying 2,800 kg (6,200 lb) of bombs. Unbuilt.

== Specifications (performance estimated) ==
Data from A Belgian Rare Avis

General characteristics

- Crew: 3 (2 pilots and radio operator)
- Capacity:
  - 20 passengers or
  - 2,000 kg (4,400 lb)
- Length: 17.50 m (57 ft 5 in)
- Wingspan: 25.50 m (83 ft 8 in)
- Height: 5.50 m (18 ft 1 in)
- Wing area: 87 m^{2} (940 sq ft)
- Empty weight: 6,100 kg (13,448 lb)
- Max takeoff weight: 10,500 kg (23,149 lb)
- Powerplant: 3 × Gnome-Rhône 9K 9-cylinder air-cooled radial engine, 560 kW (750 hp) each

Performance

- Maximum speed: 435 km/h (270 mph, 235 kn) at 5,000 ft (1,500 m)
- Cruise speed: 350 km/h (220 mph, 190 kn)
- Range: 1,800 km (1,100 mi, 970 nmi)
- Service ceiling: 9,000 m (30,000 ft)
