= Palazzo Zacco =

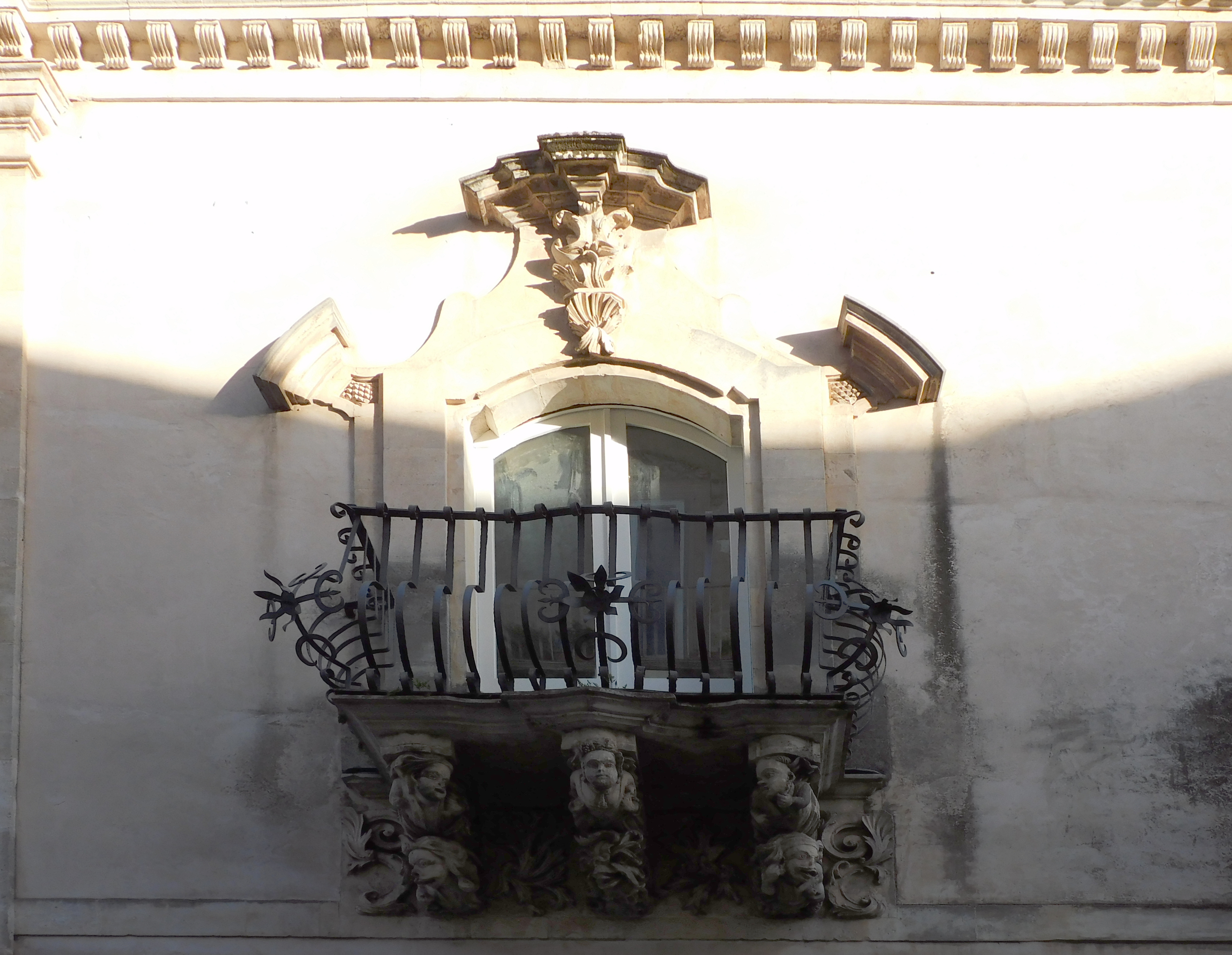
Balcony of the Palazzo Zacco

Palazzo Zacco is a palace in Ragusa, Sicily. It is most notable for the carvings in the Sicilian Baroque style which decorate its facades, especially the putti and masks which appear to support the palazzo's balconies on two of its symmetrical elevations. The palazzo was constructed circa 1750 as the townhouse for Baron Melfi di San Antonio. It was later bought by the Zacco family who renamed it after themselves as was the tradition of the time.

The building has two street façades, each with six wide balconies bearing the coat of arms of the Melfi family, a frame of acanthus leaves from which a puttino leans. The balconies, a feature of the palazzo, are notable for the differing corbels which support them, ranging from putti to musicians and grotesques. The focal points of the principal façade are the three central balconies, divided by columns with Corinthian capitals. Here the balconies are supported by images of musicians with grotesque faces.

The palazzo is today an Italian national monument.
