= Jacques Thieffry =

French field hockey player (1924–2006)

Jacques Auguste André Thieffry (10 May 1924 – 13 July 2006) was a French field hockey player who competed in the 1948 Summer Olympics and in the 1952 Summer Olympics. He died in Lille on 13 July 2006, at the age of 82.
