= Thieffry metro station =

Metro station in Brussels, Belgium

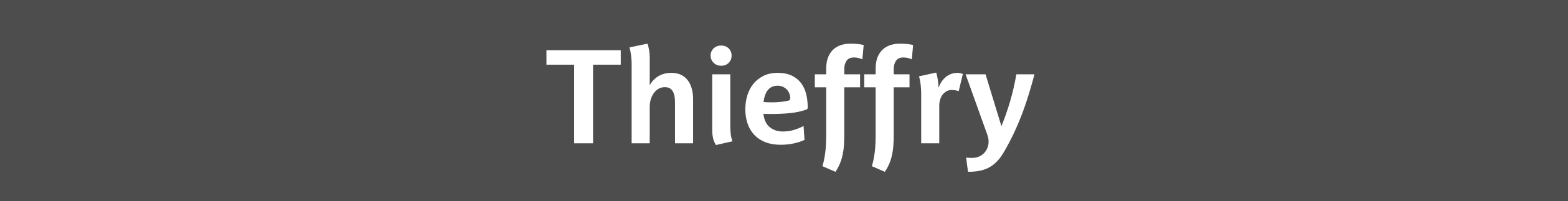

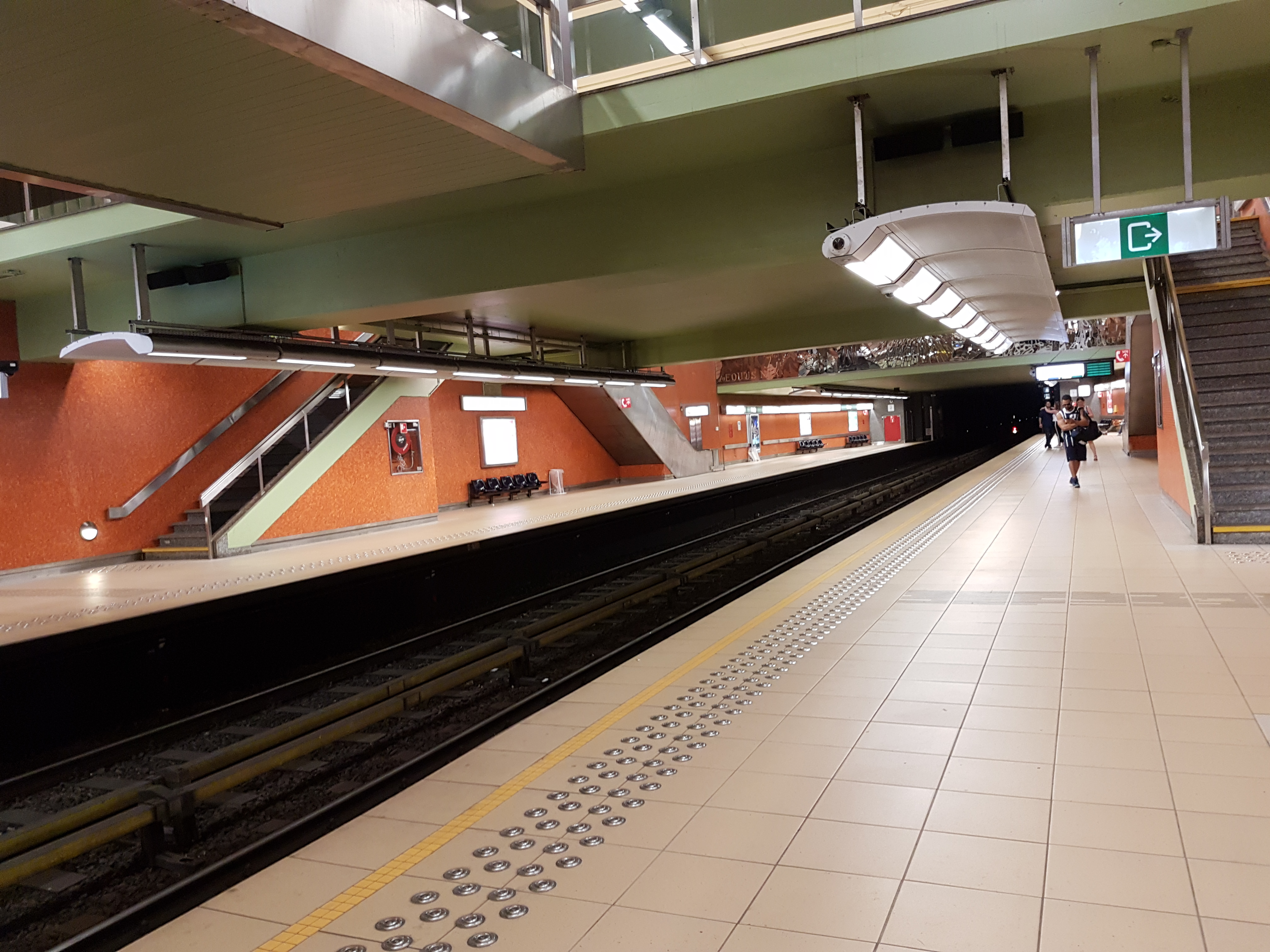
- Thieffry metro station

General information
- Location: Pont Fernand Demany / Fernand Demanybrug; 1040 Etterbeek, Brussels-Capital Region, Belgium
- Coordinates: 50°49′58″N 4°24′6″E
- Owner: STIB/MIVB
- Platforms: 2
- Tracks: 2

Construction
- Structure type: Surface level

History
- Opened: 20 September 1976; 50 years ago

Services
Preceding station	Brussels Metro	Following station
Merode towards Erasme/Erasmus	Line 5	Pétillon towards Herrmann-Debroux
Location

Thieffry (French pronunciation: [tjɛfʁi]) is a Brussels Metro station on the eastern branch of line 5. It is located in the municipality of Etterbeek, in the eastern part of Brussels, Belgium. It is named after the Belgian aviator Edmond Thieffry.

The metro station opened on 20 September 1976. Then, following the reorganisation of the Brussels Metro on 4 April 2009, it is served by the extended east–west line 5.

== See also ==
- Transport in Brussels
- History of Brussels
