= Zacco family =

The Zacco family originated from Spain, where they are first recorded in when Stefano Zacco was a councillor of King Alfonso II of Aragon in the 12th century.

When Sicily became subject to Aragonese rule in 1282, following the Sicilian Vespers, the Zacco family arrived with King Peter I, various branches of the family were soon established in the principal cities of Sicily - Palermo, Modica, Lentini and Siracusa. Members of the Zacco family were active in the higher echelons of Sicilian society in the roles of Governors, the Church, the military, and the magistracy.

The Palazzo Zacco, an important example of Sicilian Baroque, in Ragusa was purchased from the Melfi family by a branch of the Zacco family in the late 18th century. By 1848 the family were probably extinct, as they are no longer listed in the "Sicilian Golden Book of Nobility" (Libro d'Oro).
