= Alfred Renard =

Belgian aviation pioneer (1895–1988)

- Born: 21 April 1895; Anderlecht
- Died: 20 June 1988 (aged 93)
- Education: Free University of Brussels
- Engineering career
- Discipline: aviation
- Institutions: Stampe et Vertongen

Alfred Renard (21 April 1895 – 20 June 1988) was a Belgian aviation pioneer.

== Biography ==
Alfred Renard was born in Anderlecht on 21 April 1895. As a youngster and inspired by the kites he saw his father make, he installed electricity and a telephone system at an uncle's farm.

In 1912, his inspiration was kindled by a prize of 10.000 francs, offered by French car builder Peugeot to the first cyclist to make two aircraft flights of 10 meters each, relying solely on his or her own muscular power. Alfred conceived and, with help from his brother Georges, made his own device for the test: a bicycle augmented with a propeller and a fabric-covered wing, which unfolded by means of a lever when the device reached airspeed. The machine failed, however.

During World War I the brothers worked in the family home at a pedal-powered lathe, producing pieces for a Brussels workshop; they also built engines. They ventured into building a five-meter-long blimp that they fill with compressed air.

The war forced Alfred Renard to suspend his studies at the Free University of Brussels and the Department of Applied Sciences, but in 1920 he earned an engineering degree in civil construction, plus a license in aeronautics.

After study came the tour of soldier's duty, especially important in this small country that had suffered heavily under the war, and was taking part in the occupation of Western Germany. Renard served as a cartographer, designing military aerodromes. During this service he re-acquainted one of his former university teachers, Emile Allard, newly appointed chief of the military aviation technical service TSA, and creator of a Belgian Aeronautical Laboratory. After several visits to Gustave Eiffel in Paris, the two of them would build a wind tunnel at Sint-Genesius-Rode. They also designed an all-metal monoplane, built at Zeebrugge by company ZACCO (best known under the French acronym ACAZ) as the ACAZ T-2. It failed to meet commercial success.

Through the same Emile Allard, Renard got in touch with Jean Stampe and his cherished dream of operating his own flying school with his self-designed and self-built solid trainer aircraft. The venture was completed with Maurice Vertongen, its designs marked RSV for Renard-Stampe-Vertongen. The company statute left Renard free to keep his position as chief engineer at the Defense Ministry, meanwhile designing RSV-aircraft built and sold by Stampe et Vertongen

== Renard Constructions Aéronautiques ==
In 1925, Alfred Renard created his own company as Société anonyme des avions et moteurs Renard in Brussels. The main activity was the design and production of aircraft engines of 100, 120 and 240 hp. Some of them served Belgian military aviation, some were sold in Poland and in the USA. Also, a Renard 240 hp engine powered the second version of Belgium's first helicopter, built by and named after Russian engineer Nicolas Florine. In 1928, his brother Georges Renard joined the company which was then renamed Renard Constructions Aéronautiques. The brothers shifted away from engine design: their R-31 and R-36 were powered by engines from abroad.

== World War II and aftermath ==
Foreseeing the German invasion in 1940, Alfred Renard planned to move his assets to France, but not in time. During World War II he disappeared from public view, to re-emerge in 1945 as a technical advisor with the Belgian State Railways NMBS/SNCB, making a study of light alloy railcars. In 1947, he rejoined Jean Stampe, having always remained on good terms with him, to become a manager at a new company Stampe & Renard until that company's dissolution in January 1970. On top of producing the Stampe SV.4 trainer, he worked at propeller engineering, at the development of the Stampe & Renard SR-7 and the Stampe & Renard SR-45 project.

Run over by a motorcar, Alfred Renard died on 20 June 1988.
