= ACAZ C.2 =

Prototype fighter aircraft in Belgium

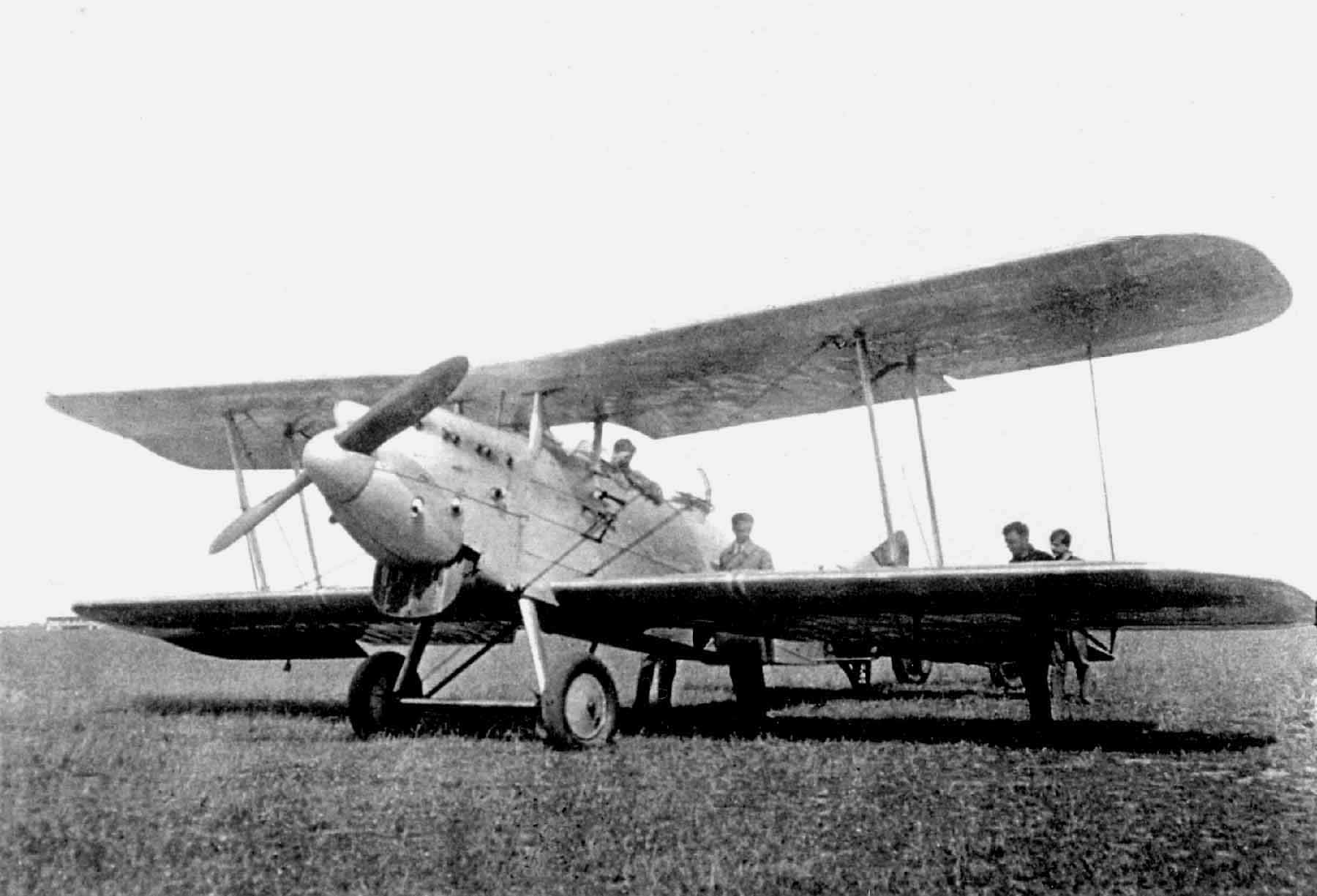

General information
- Type: Training Fighter
- National origin: Belgium
- Manufacturer: ACAZ (Ateliers de Construction Aeronautique de Zeebruge)
- Number built: 1

History
- First flight: 1926

The ACAZ C.2, Ateliers de Construction Aeronautique de Zeebruge, was a prototype Belgian biplane fighter aircraft built in the 1920s.

== Design and development ==
Built entirely of Duralumin metal, it was an advanced design at the time of its first flight in 1926, but although evaluated by the Belgian Air Force, no orders were placed. Of conventional biplane construction, the C.2, registered as O-BAFX, later OO-AFX, incorporated one unique feature - all four of its wings were identical and interchangeable. The aircraft also included space for cameras, allowing it to be used for photo-reconnaissance.

== Operational history ==
Flown early in 1926 and evaluated by the Belgian Aéronautique Militaire, the C.2 tandem two-seat fighter-reconnaissance biplane was built by the Ateliers de Construction Aéronautique de Zeebrugge (A.C.A.Z.). Of all-metal construction, the C.2 was powered by a 450 hp Hispano-Suiza 12Ha 12-cylinder liquid-cooled engine, and an interesting feature was the interchangeability of all four main wing panels. The pilot and observer/gunner were seated in tandem and armament consisted of a single fixed forward-firing synchronized 7.7-mm Vickers machine gun and two Lewis guns of similar caliber on a flexible mount. No production order for the C.2 was placed by the Aéronautique Militaire, and, on 03/09/1928, the sole prototype was employed for an attempt to fly to the Belgian Congo, this ending in a forced landing in France. The Aircraft was written off on 01/25/1933.

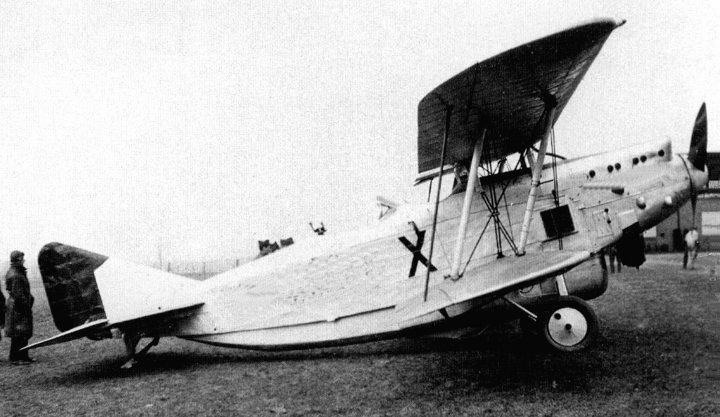
Modified ACAZ C.2

== Specifications (ACAZ C.2) ==
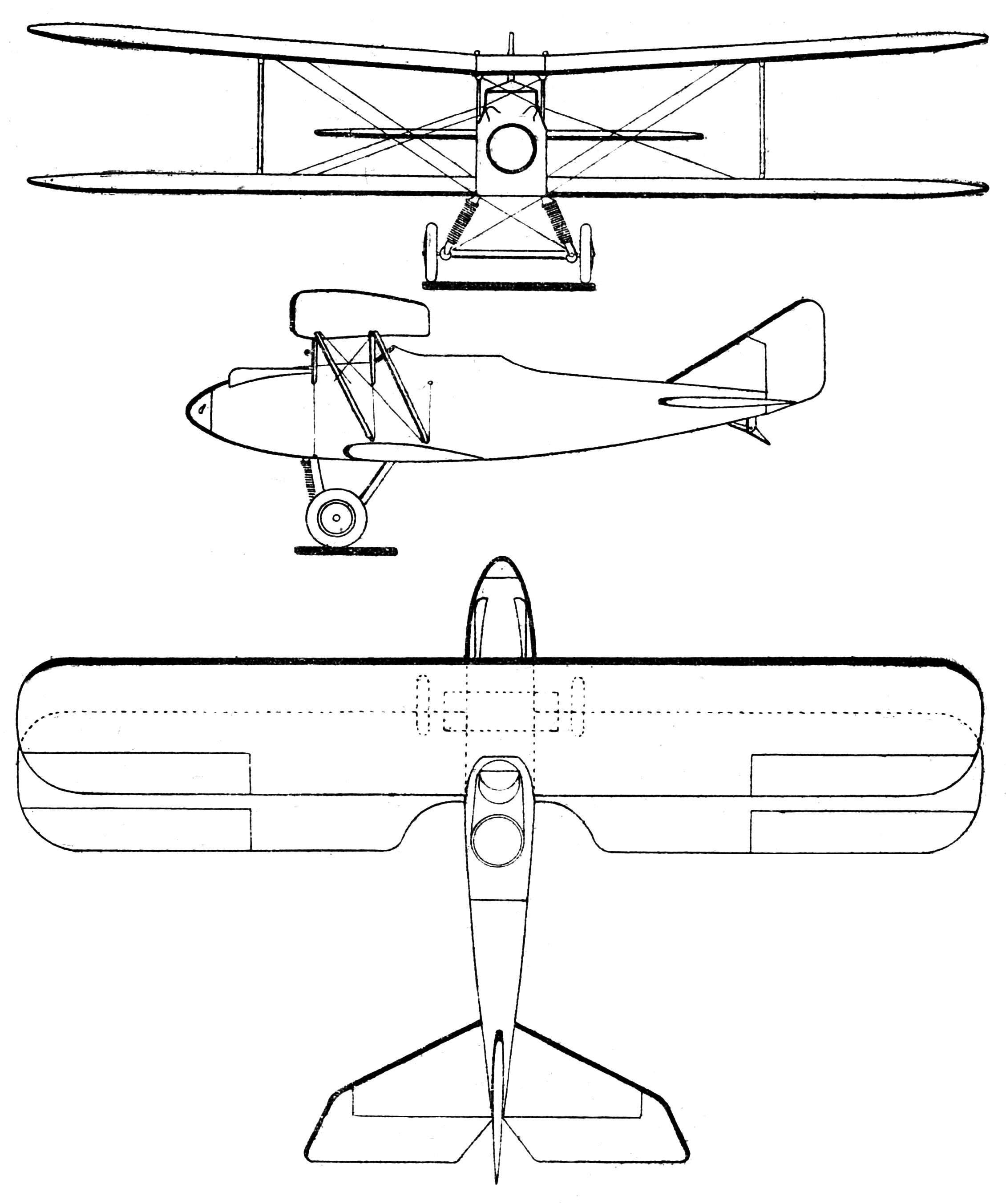
ACAZ C.2 3-view drawing from Les Ailes September 30, 1926

Data from The Complete Book of Fighters

General characteristics

- Crew: 2
- Length: 8.25 m (27 ft 1 in)
- Wingspan: 12.5 m (41 ft 0 in)
- Height: 3.4 m (11 ft 2 in)
- Wing area: 40.56 m^{2} (436.6 sq ft)
- Empty weight: 1,260 kg (2,778 lb)
- Gross weight: 2,070 kg (4,564 lb)
- Powerplant: 1 × Hispano-Suiza 12Ha V-12 water-cooled piston engine, 340 kW (450 hp)

Performance

- Maximum speed: 250 km/h (160 mph, 130 kn)
- Endurance: 3.5 hours at full power
- Time to altitude: 6,000 m (20,000 ft) in 35 minutes

Armament

- One .303 in (7.7 mm) Vickers machine gun firing through the propeller hub
- Two .303 in (7.7 mm) Lewis machine guns on a flexible mount for the observer
