= Stampe et Vertongen RSV.28 =

RSV.28/180

General information
- Type: Military trainer aircraft
- National origin: Belgium
- Manufacturer: Stampe et Vertongen
- Primary user: Belgian Air Force
- Number built: 1

History
- First flight: c. 1929
- Developed into: Stampe et Vertongen ST-26

The Stampe et Vertongen RSV.28/180 Type III, also known as the RSV.28-PSV (for pilotage sans visibilité, French for blind flying) was a military trainer aircraft built in Belgium to teach instrument-flying techniques. It was a response to a 1929 order from the Belgian Air Force, whose instrument-flying certification required a flight around a 100-kilometre (62 mi) triangular course and return to a point less than 5 kilometres (3.1 mi) from the start, using instruments only.

Stampe et Vertongen's response was a conventional design, a two-seat biplane fitted with a hood that could be closed over the pilot to remove visibility. Because the student pilots were also to learn to land with instruments only, the fixed undercarriage was very sturdy and had a wide track. Only one example was built, but development continued with the Stampe et Vertongen ST-26 in 1932.

== Specifications ==
Data from Jouhaud 1999, p.49, except as noted

General characteristics

- Crew: two
- Length: 8.30 m (27 ft 1 in)
- Wingspan: 10.27 m (33 ft 8 in)
- Height: 2.90 m (9 ft 6 in)
- Wing area: 26 m^{2} (280 sq ft)
- Empty weight: 800 kg (1,800 lb)
- Gross weight: 950 kg (2,100 lb)
- Powerplant: 1 × Hispano-Suiza 8Ab, water-cooled V-8 piston engine , 134 kW (180 hp)

Performance

- Maximum speed: 160 km/h (100 mph, 87 kn)
- Range: 400 km (250 mi, 220 nmi)
- Service ceiling: 4,000 m (13,000 ft)
