= Renard Type 100 =

1920s Belgian piston aircraft engine

Type 100
- Type: 5-cylinder air-cooled radial piston engine
- National origin: Belgium
- Manufacturer: Société Anonyme des Avions et Moteurs Renard
- First run: 1927

The Renard Type 100 was a five-cylinder, radial piston engine, designed and produced in the late 1920s and early 1930s by Société Anonyme des Avions et Moteurs Renard (Renard) in Belgium.

== Design and development ==
The Type 100 was a conventional air-cooled radial engine with overhead valves, operated by push-rods and rockers. Accessories were mounted on the rear crankcase plate and the propeller was driven directly, with no reduction gearing.

== Specifications (Type 100) ==
Data from Jane's all the World's Aircraft 1928

=== General characteristics ===
- Type: 5-cylinder aircooled radial piston engine
- Bore: 120 mm (4.7 in)
- Stroke: 140 mm (5.5 in)
- Displacement: 7.92 L (1.74 imp gal; 2.09 US gal)
- Diameter: 1,080 mm (43 in)
- dual ignition system

=== Components ===
- Valvetrain: 2 cam rings, pushrods and rockers operating one inlet and one exhaust valve per cylinder
- Fuel system: one carburetor supplying mixture to a crankcase plenum, then by radial pipes to inlet valves
- Oil system: dry sump pressure
- Cooling system: air-cooled
- Reduction gear: direct drive

=== Performance ===
- Power output: normal:75 kW (100 hp) at 1,400 rpm; Maximum:89 kW (120 hp) at 1,580 rpm
- Compression ratio: 5.2:1
- Specific fuel consumption: 0.301 kg/(kW hour) (0.495 lb/(hp hour))
