= Clapier =

Clapier is a surname. Notable people with the surname include:

- Faustine Clapier (born 2001), French fencer
