= Stampe et Vertongen =

Belgian aircraft manufacturer

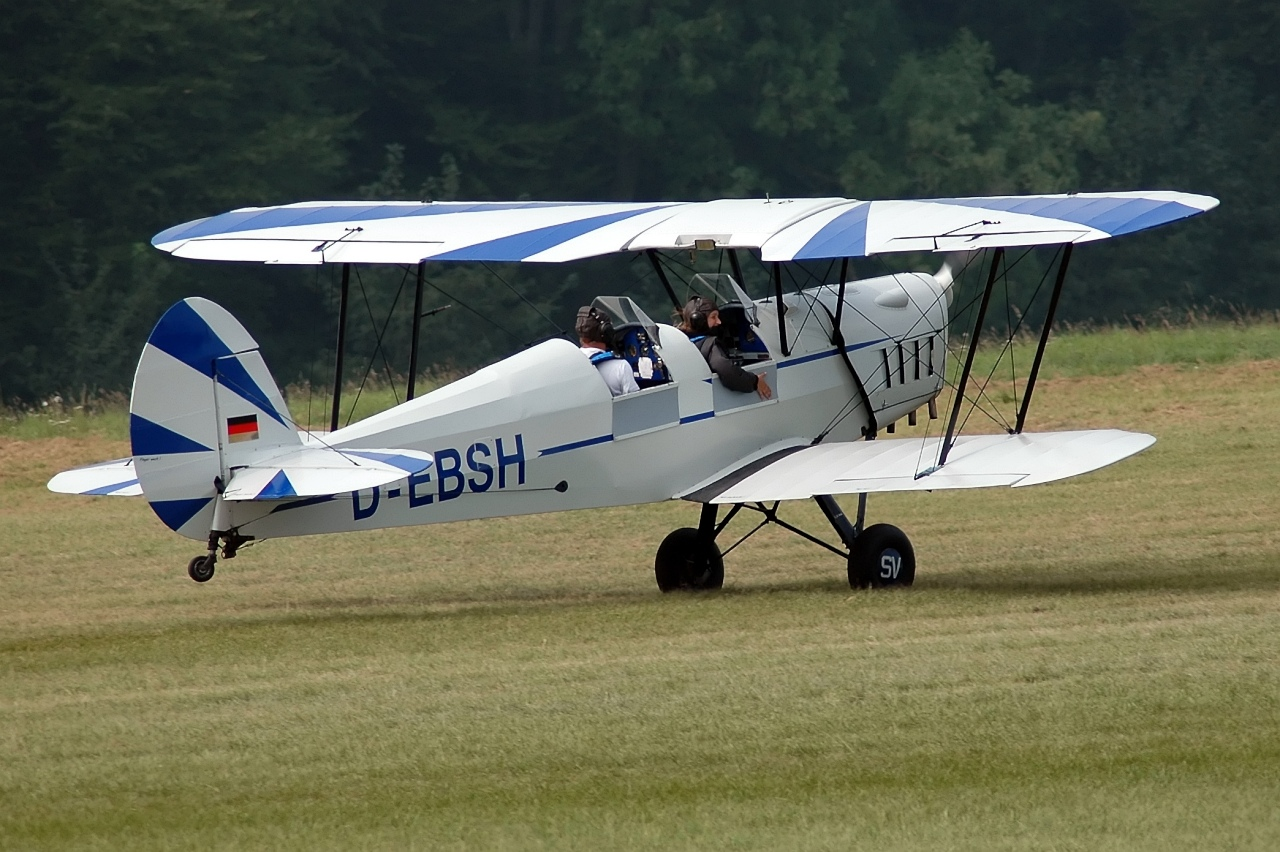
Stampe & Vertongen SV-4 D-EBSH

Stampe et Vertongen was a Belgian aircraft manufacturer formed in 1922 and based at Antwerp. The company specialised in design and construction of primary trainers/tourers and advanced trainers. One of their products—the Stampe-Vertongen SV.4—has become known in certain countries as just Stampe.

== History ==
Established in 1922 with Alfred Renard as its chief designer, the company designed a series of trainer/tourer aircraft in the 1920s and 1930s, all prefixed RSV (for Renard, Stampe & Vertongen). In the early 1930s Alfred Renard left to join a company he had formed with his brother Georges Renard Société Anonyme d'Avions et de Moteurs Renard. The RSV company designation prefix then changed to SV. The company's most successful design was the SV.4 of 1933, a light tourer/trainer biplane powered by a de Havilland Gipsy III engine. Although only 35 were produced before the start of the war, a total of 940 were built, mainly under licence by other companies.

The company was renamed Stampe et Renard when Stampe-Vertongen merged with the Renard company. Owing to the German invasion production ceased on 10 May 1940. Post-war activities did not meet with much success, and the company closed down in 1957.

== Aircraft ==
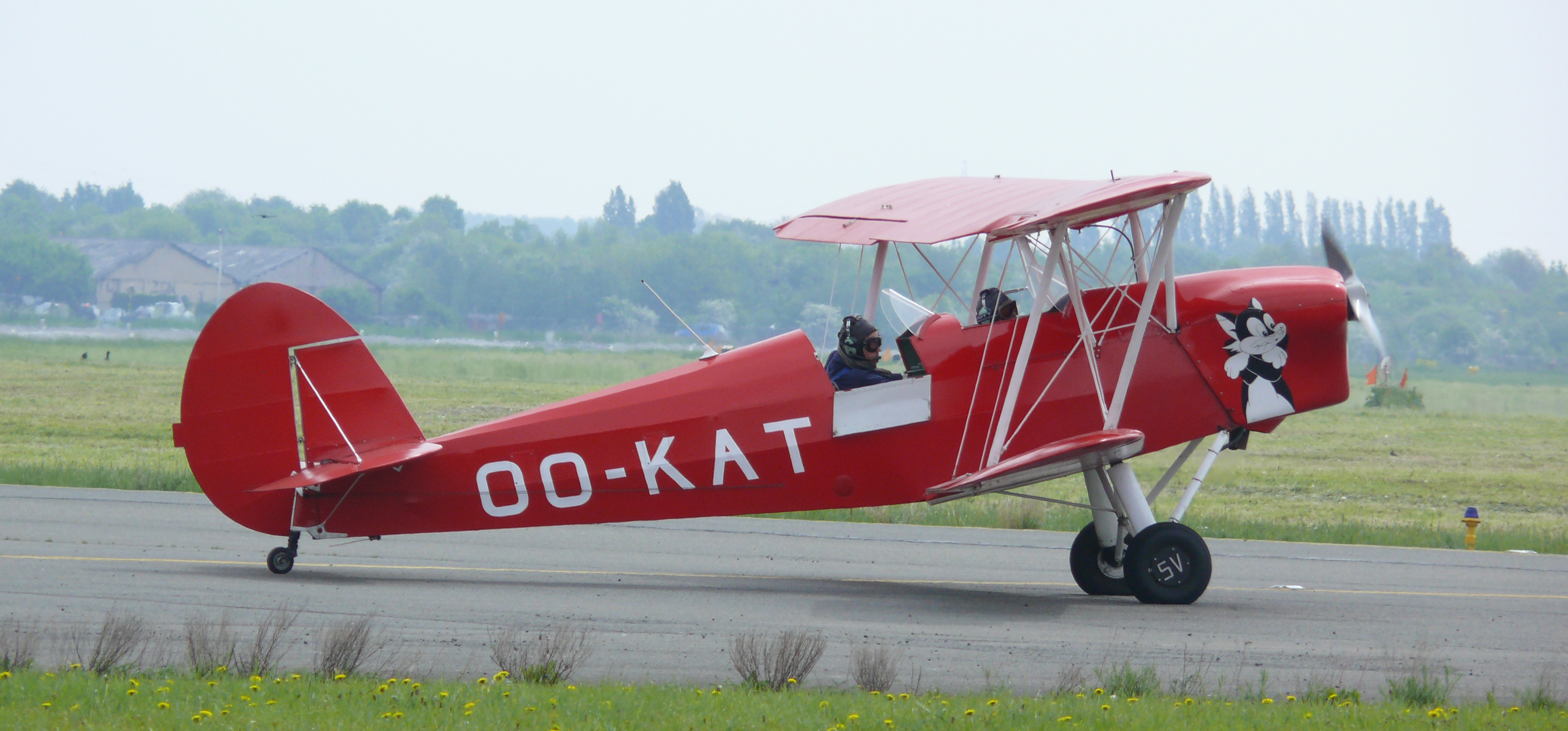
Stampe & Vertongen SV-4E OO-KAT

- RSV.20-100 parasol-wing monoplane
- RSV.22-180 trainer biplane (variant: RSV.22-200)
- RSV.22-Lynx advanced trainer biplane
- RSV.22-Titan military biplane
- RSV.23-180 trainer biplane
- RSV.26-100 trainer/tourer biplane, convertible into a monoplane (variants: RSV.18-100, RSV.18-105)
- RSV.26-140 trainer biplane (variants: RSV.26-180, RSV.26-Lynx)
- RSV.28-180 advanced trainer biplane
- RSV.32-90 trainer biplane (variants: RSV.32-100, RSV.32-105, RSV.32-110, RSV.32-120, RSV.32-130)
- SV.4 trainer/tourer biplane
- SV.5 military training biplane
- SV.7 reconnaissance-bomber
- SV.10 biplane bomber
- SV.18 lightweight parasol wing monoplane
