= Ateliers de Construction Aéronautique de Zeebruges =

Belgian aircraft manufacturer in Zeebruge

Ateliers de Construction Aéronautique de Zeebruges (ACAZ) also known as Zeebrugge Aeronautical Construction Company (Zacco) was a Belgian aircraft manufacturer of the 1920s, based in Zeebrugge. The company built a number of innovative prototypes, but due largely to indifference by the Belgian government, the company folded without having put a single design into mass production.

== List of Aircraft ==
- ACAZ T.1 (1924) Single-engine monoplane. One built and destroyed during a test flight.
- ACAZ T.2 (1924) Single-engine monoplane. One of world's first all-metal monoplane. One built
- ACAZ C.2 (1926) Single-engine two-seat fighter/reconnaissance all-metal biplane. One built
