= Stampe-Vertongen SV.4 =

1933 Belgian two-seat biplane

SV.4
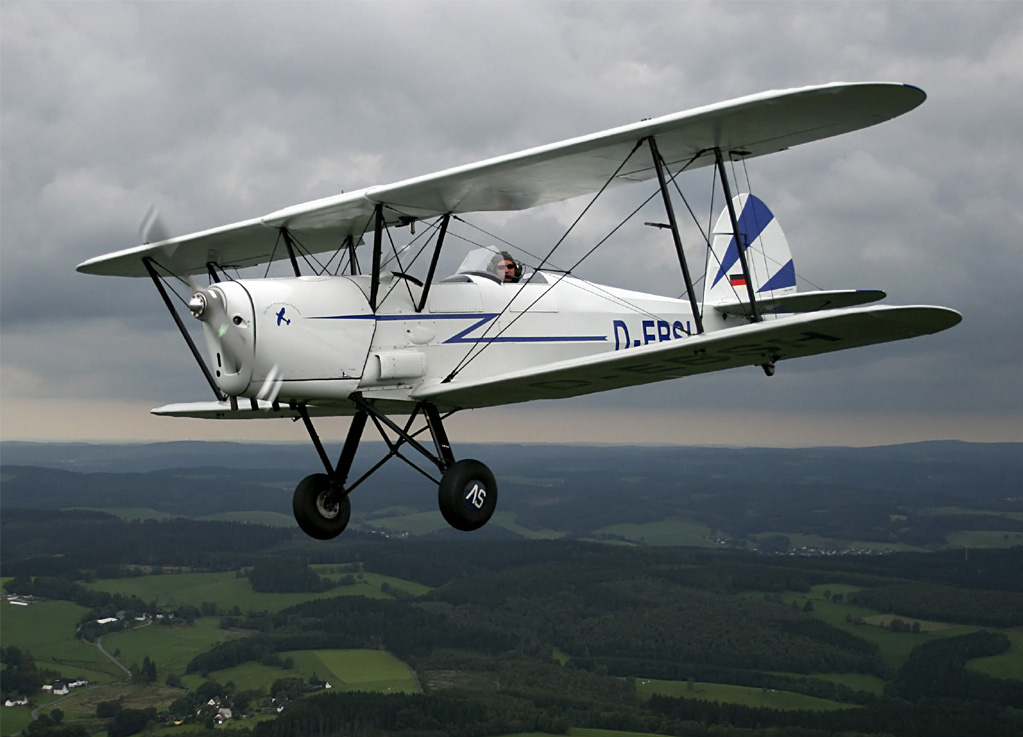
- SV-4C D-EBSH

General information
- Type: Two-seat trainer
- Manufacturer: Stampe et Vertongen
- Designer: George Ivanov
- Status: Privately owned, or in museums
- Primary user: French Air Force
- Number built: 1050

History
- Introduction date: 1947 (Belgian Air Force)
- First flight: 1933
- Retired: 1975

The Stampe et Vertongen SV.4 (also known incorrectly as the Stampe SV.4 or just Stampe) is a Belgian two-seat trainer/tourer biplane designed and built by Stampe et Vertongen. The aircraft was also built under licence in France and French Algeria.

== History ==
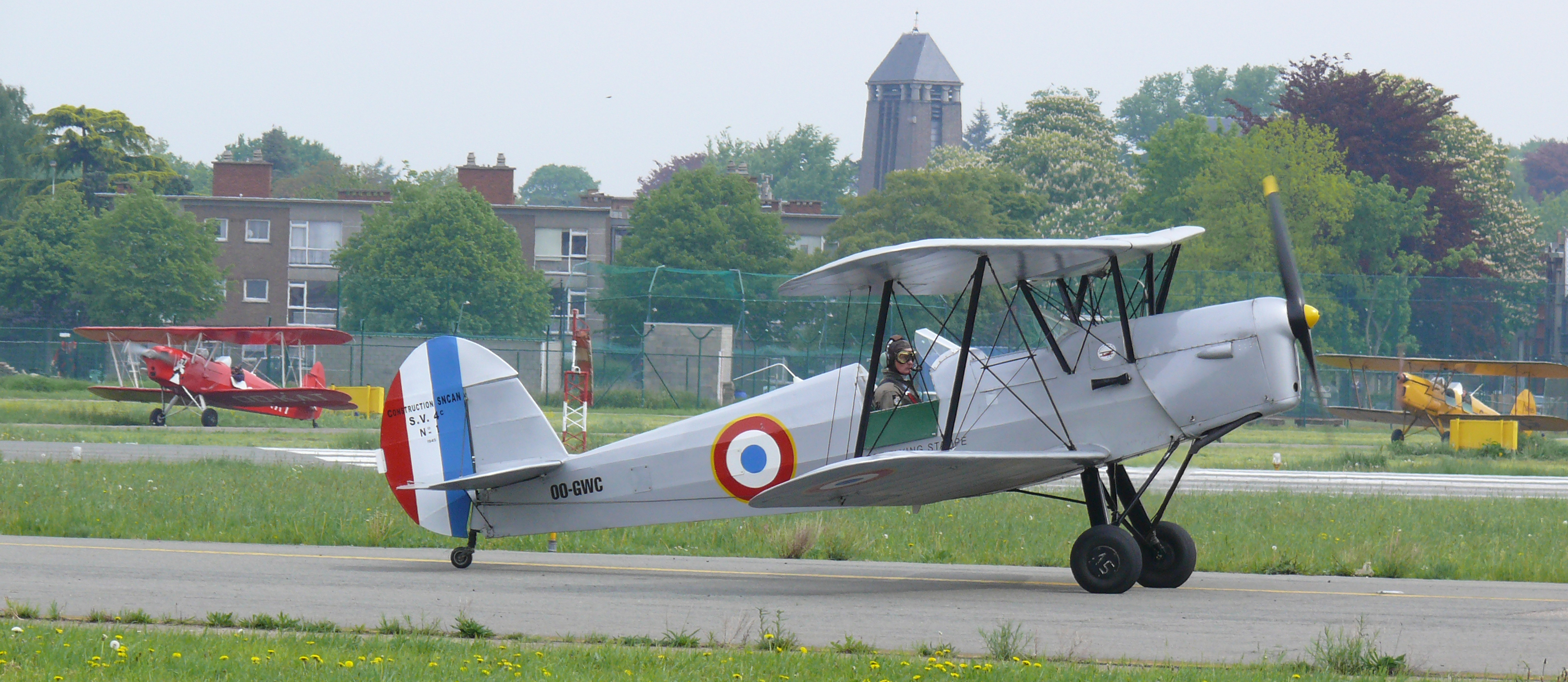
Stampe & Vertongen SV-4A OO-GWC

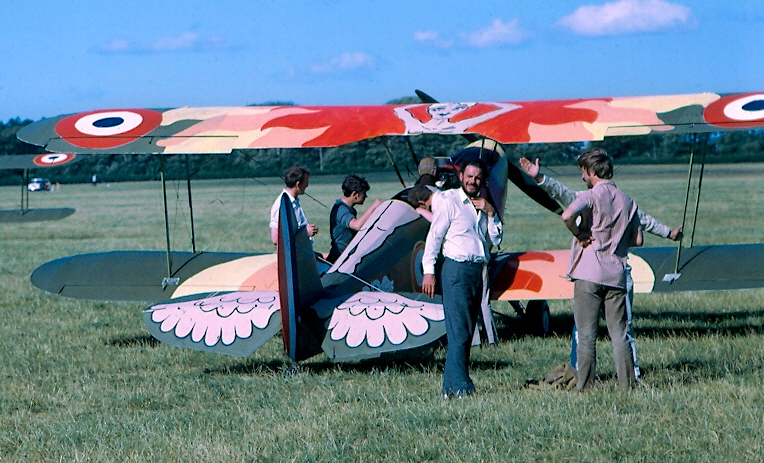
Lynn Garrison SV.4C painted for Cliff Robertson film project, Weston, Ireland, 1969

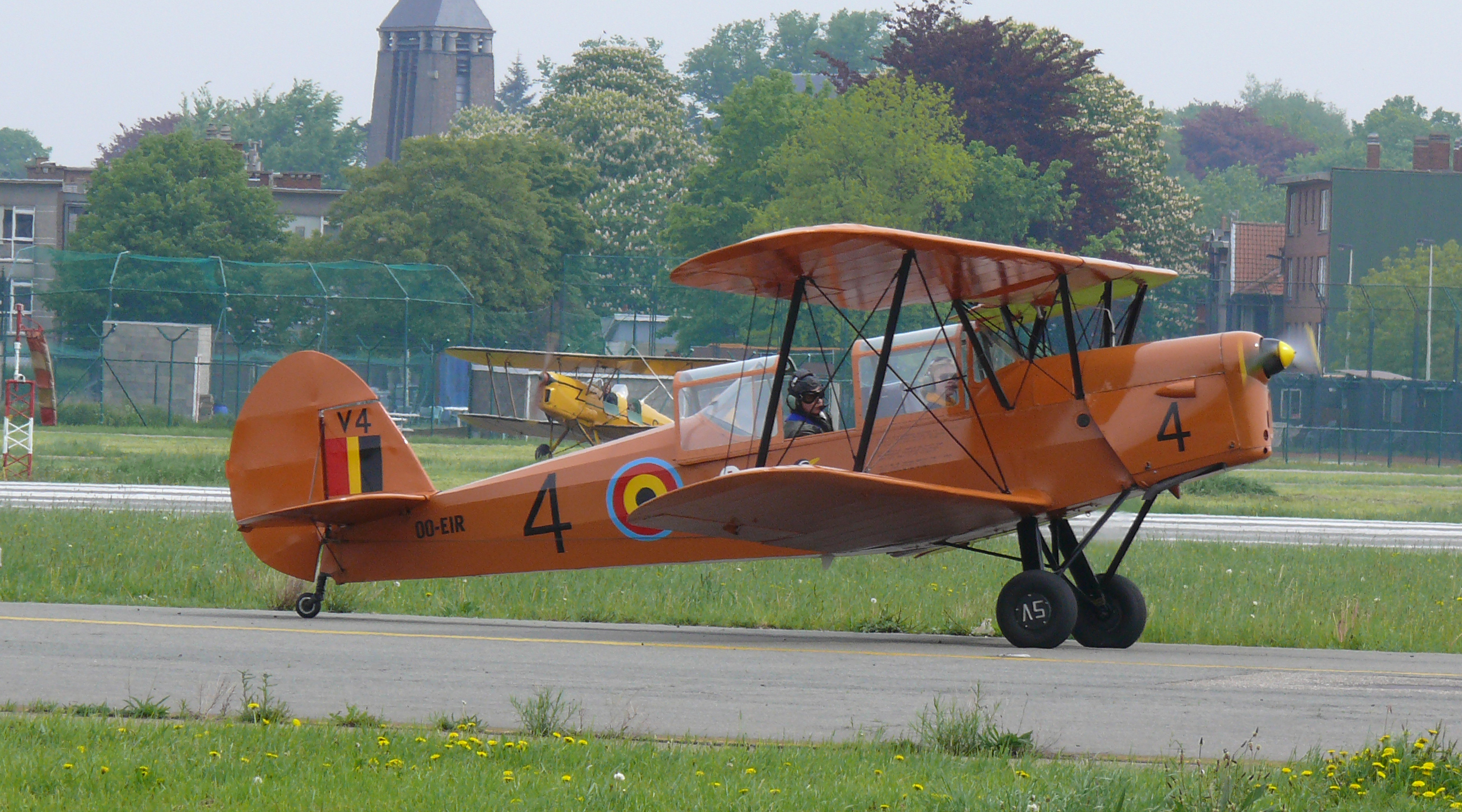
Stampe & Vertongen SV-4B V4

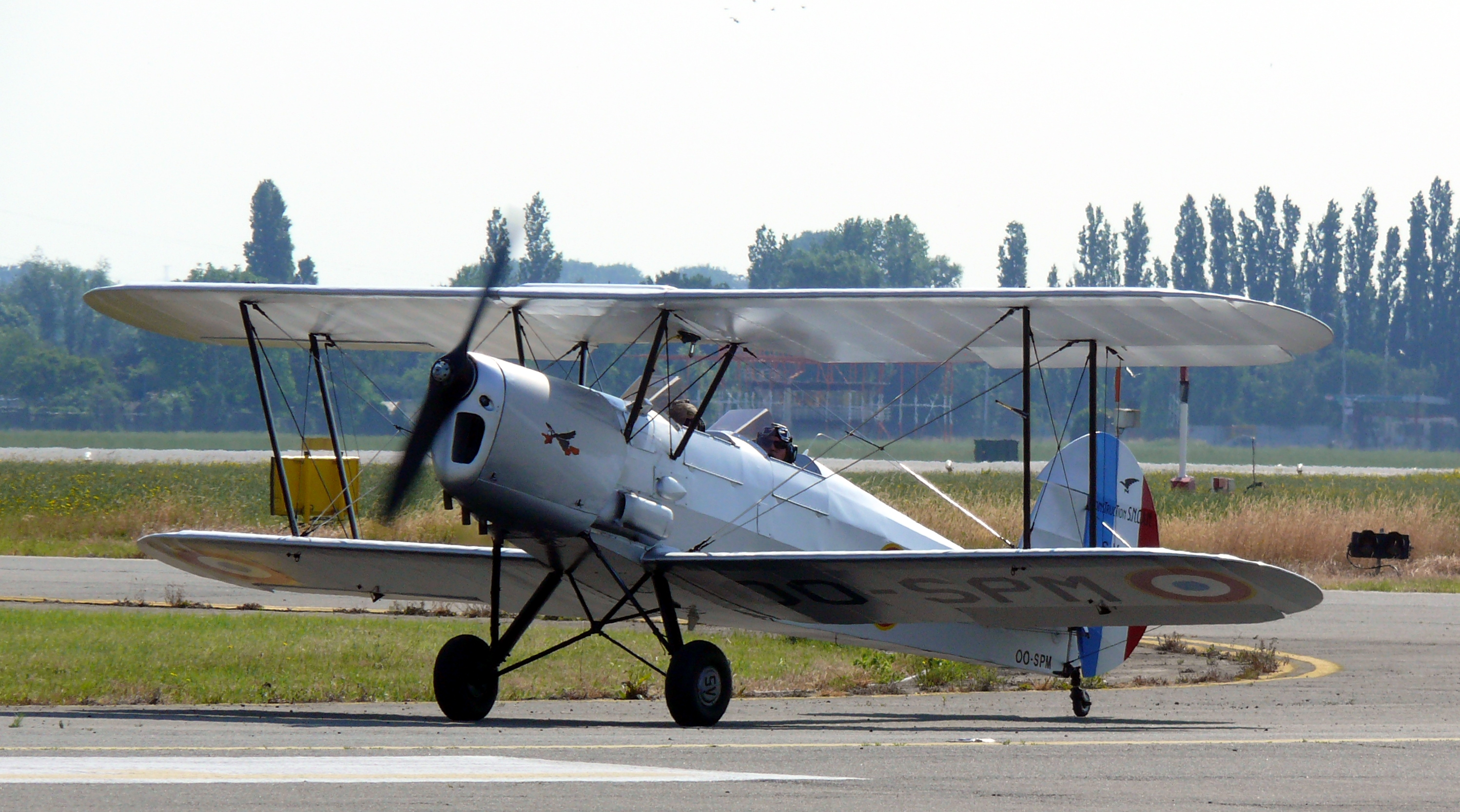
Stampe & Vertongen SV-4C OO-SPM

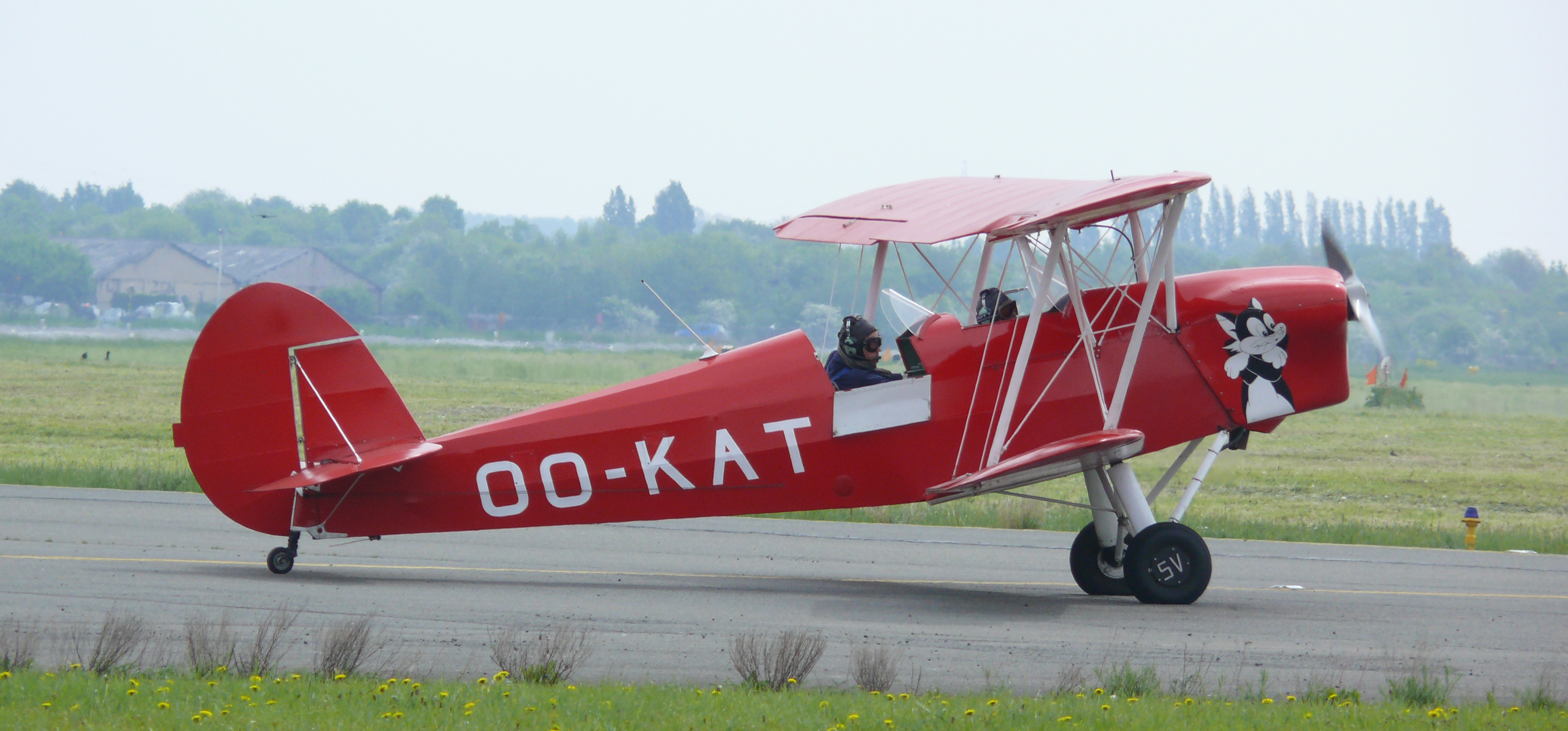
Stampe & Vertongen SV-4E OO-KAT

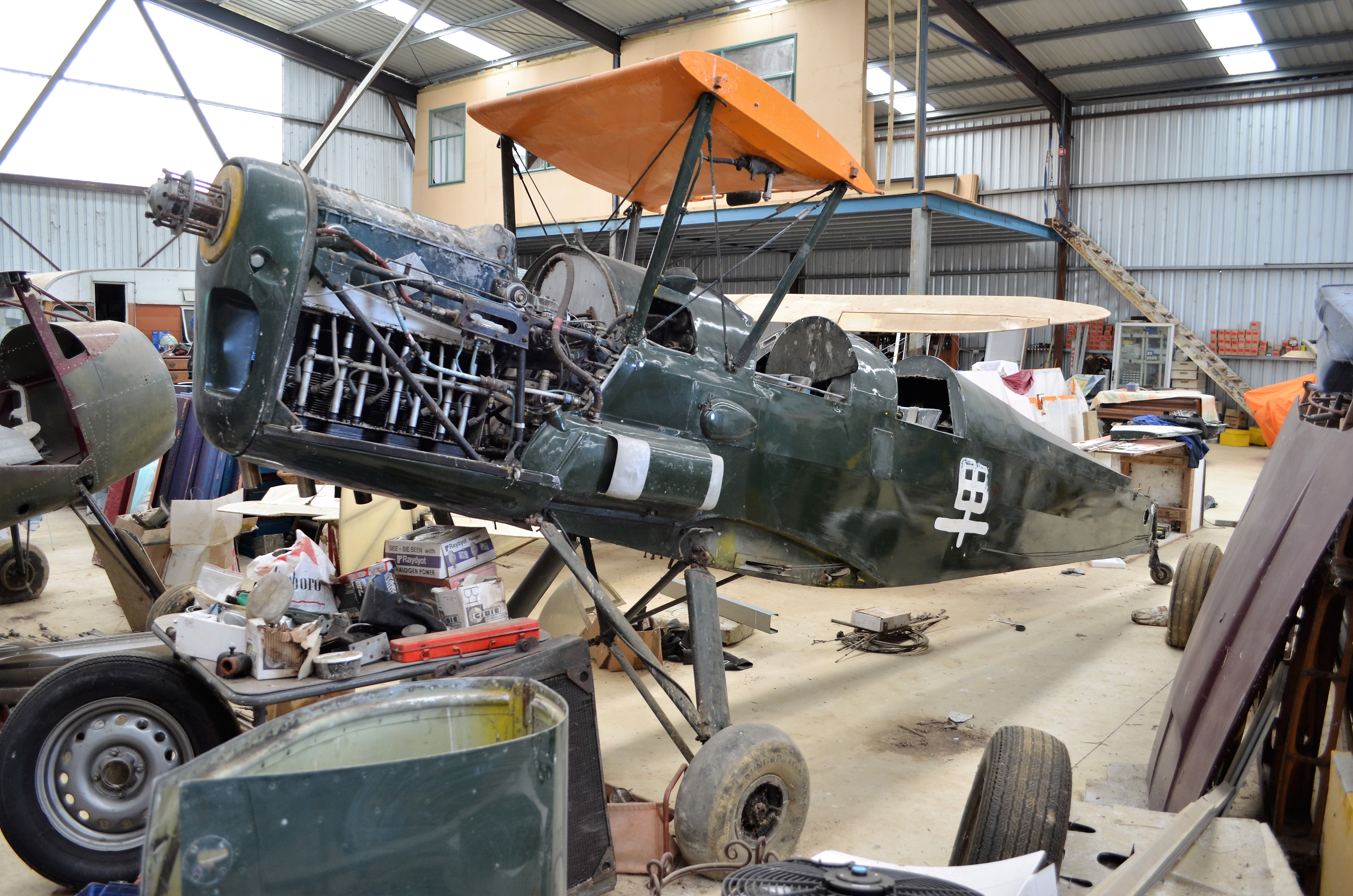
SV4A serial_219, North Island, New Zealand

The SV.4 was designed as a biplane tourer/training aircraft in the early 1930s, by Stampe et Vertongen in Antwerp. The first model was the SV.4A, an advanced aerobatic trainer, followed by the SV.4B with redesigned wings and the 130 hp/97 kW de Havilland Gipsy Major engine.

Only 35 aircraft were built before the company was closed during the Second World War. After the war, between 1948 and 1955, the successor company Stampe et Renard built a further 65 aircraft as trainers for the Belgian Air Force.

A licensed SV.4C version was built in France by SNCAN (Société Nationale de Constructions Aéronautiques du Nord), and in French Algeria by Atelier Industriel de l'Aéronautique d'Alger, the two companies completing a combined total of 940 aircraft. The postwar SV.4Cs were widely used by French military units as a primary trainer. Many also served in aeroclubs in France, numbers of which were later sold second hand to the United Kingdom and other countries. The Rothmans Aerobatic Team flew SV.4C aircraft from 1970 to 1973.

== Variants ==
SV.4
prototype
SV.4A
aerobatic trainer with 140 hp/104 kW Renault 4P-O5 engine
SV.4B
improved version with 130 hp/97 kW de Havilland Gipsy Major I. Postwar trainers for the BAF were fitted with more powerful Cirrus Major or Gipsy Major X engine
SV.4C
licence-built version with 140 hp/104 kW Renault 4Pei engine
SV.4D
one aircraft re-engined with 175 hp/130 kW Mathis G.4R engine

A few SV.4s have been fitted with other engines, such as the Lycoming O-320, Ranger 6 or LOM 332b. At least one aircraft fitted with a Lycoming engine (OO-KAT) has been referred to by its owners as an SV.4E.

== Military operators ==
Belgium

- Belgian Air Force

Belgian Congo

- Force Publique

France

- French Air Force
- French Army
- French Navy

United Kingdom

- Royal Air Force
  - No. 510 Squadron RAF operated one aircraft "liberated" by Belgian pilots Léon Divoy and Michel Donnet in 1941, and flown from occupied Belgium to England.

== Specifications (Post-War SV.4B) ==
Data from Factory drawings and

General characteristics

- Crew: 2
- Length: 6.8 m (22 ft 4 in)
- Wingspan: 8.385 m (27 ft 6 in)
- Height: 2.775 m (9 ft 1 in)
- Wing area: 18.06 m^{2} (194.4 sq ft)
- Empty weight: 520 kg (1,146 lb)
- Max takeoff weight: 770 kg (1,698 lb)
- Powerplant: 1 × de Havilland Gipsy Major X 4-cylinder air-cooled inverted in-line piston engine, 108 kW (145 hp)

or Blackburn Cirrus Major III

- Propellers: 2-bladed fixed-pitch propeller

Performance

- Maximum speed: 188 km/h (117 mph, 102 kn)
- Cruise speed: 140 km/h (87 mph, 76 kn)
- Range: 420 km (260 mi, 230 nmi)
- Service ceiling: 6,000 m (20,000 ft)

== See also ==
Aircraft of comparable role, configuration, and era

- Boeing-Stearman Kaydet
- Bücker Bü 131 Jungmann
- de Havilland Tiger Moth
- Levente II

Related lists

- List of aircraft of the RAF
