= Stits-Besler Executive =

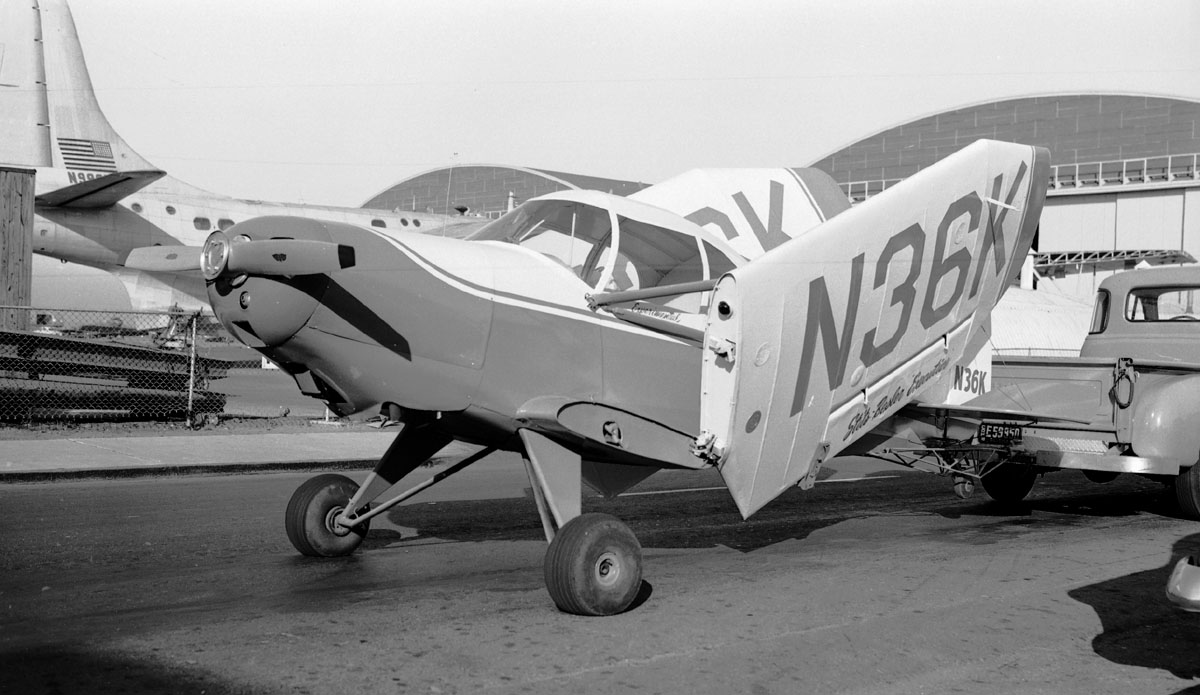

General information
- Type: Homebuilt aircraft
- National origin: United States of America
- Designer: Ray Stits
- Number built: 1

History
- Introduction date: 1955
- Developed from: Stits Playboy

The Stits-Besler Executive is a three place homebuilt aircraft designed by Ray Stits, as the Stits SA-4A Executive.

== Development ==
The project was initiated when William Besler of Besler Corp. contracted Ray Stits to design a three-place homebuilt aircraft with folding wings. Besler was an early aviation experimenter, who had mounted a steam engine of his own design on a Travel Air 2000 in 1933.

== Design ==
The wings on the Executive fold aft and upward. Fuel tanks are embedded in the non-folding wing roots. The fuselage is welded steel tube with fabric covering. The ailerons are mounted in the center of the wing rather than the tips.

== Operational history ==
The sole Executive, (registration no. N36K), has been used as a test bed for Besler-designed engines; a 150 hp (112 kW) steam engine and a two cycle, four cylinder Vee rated at 100 hp (75 kW).

== Specifications (Stits-Besler Executive) ==
Data from Jane's All the World's Aircraft 1955–56

General characteristics

- Crew: 1 pilot
- Capacity: 2 passengers
- Length: 18 ft 6 in (5.64 m)
- Wingspan: 25 ft 6 in (7.77 m)
- Width: 7 ft 5 in (2.26 m) (with wings folded)
- Height: 6 ft 11 in (2.11 m) (wings folded)
- Wing area: 120 sq ft (11 m^{2})
- Empty weight: 800 lb (363 kg)
- Gross weight: 1,450 lb (658 kg)
- Fuel capacity: 24 US gal (20 imp gal; 91 L)
- Powerplant: 1 × Lycoming O-320 air-cooled flat-four, 150 hp (110 kW)

Performance

- Maximum speed: 143 kn (165 mph, 266 km/h)
- Cruise speed: 130 kn (150 mph, 240 km/h)
- Stall speed: 43 kn (50 mph, 80 km/h)
- Rate of climb: 2,500 ft/min (13 m/s)

== See also ==
Related development

- Stits SA-1A Junior
- Stits SA-2A Sky Baby
- Stits SA-3 Playboy
- Stits SA-4A Executive
- Stits SA-5 Flut-R-Bug
- Stits SA-7 Sky-Coupe
- Stits SA-8A Skeeto
- Stits SA-9A Sky-Coupe
- Stits SA-11A Playmate
