= 1957 in aviation =

This is a list of aviation-related events from 1957.

== Events ==
- The Douglas AIR-2 Genie ("Ding-Dong") unguided air-to-air missile enters service with the United States Air Force. It mounts a 1.5-kiloton nuclear warhead and has a lethal radius of 1,000 feet (300 m).
- The United Kingdom's Minister of Defence, Duncan Sandys, states that the crewed fighter jets have become obsolete and will be replaced by missiles. His 1957 Defence White Paper proposes ending the use of fighters by the Royal Air Force and concentrating on missile technology.
- The United States Air Force cancels the Martin XB-68 program.
- American Airlines opens the American Airlines Stewardess College at Fort Worth, Texas, as the world's first centralized flight attendant training center.
- Summer 1957 – For the first time, as many passengers cross the North Atlantic Ocean by airliner as by ocean liner.

=== January ===
- The Avro Vulcan strategic bomber enters service with the Royal Air Force. It begins to enter squadron service during the summer of 1957.
- January 3 – Trans World Airlines becomes the first airline to offer its passengers freshly brewed coffee in flight.
- January 4 – The Brooklyn Dodgers become the first professional baseball team to purchase its own airplane, buying a Convair CV-440. To reduce the CV-440's price to US$775,000, the team purchases it as part of a larger Eastern Airlines order.
- January 18 – Three United States Air Force B-52 Stratofortress bombers make the world's first round-the-world, non-stop flight by turbojet-powered aircraft. They complete the flight in 45 hours 19 minutes, at an average speed of 534 mph (859 km/h).
- January 31 – A Douglas DC-7B being operated by the Douglas Aircraft Company on a test flight with a crew of four prior to delivery to Continental Airlines collides in mid-air over California's San Fernando Valley with a U.S. Air Force F-89J Scorpion with a crew of two on a test flight to check its radar equipment. The F-89J crashes in La Tuna Canyon in the Verdugo Mountains, killing its pilot and injuring the other crew member, who ejects to a parachute landing in Burbank, California. The DC-7B remains airborne for several minutes, dropping debris into neighborhoods below, before crashing into the grounds of a church and the athletic field of Pacoima Junior High School in the Pacoima district of Los Angeles, California, where 220 boys are gathered; the crash kills all four people on the plane and three boys on the ground, and injures an estimated 74 students. Among the dead on the DC-7B is its copilot, test pilot and actor Archie Twitchell.

=== February ===
- February 1 – Northeast Airlines Flight 823, a Douglas DC-6A, crashes in Queens, New York, shortly after takeoff from LaGuardia Airport in New York City, killing 20 of the 101 people on board and injuring 78 of the 81 survivors.
- February 5 – The official opening of Salisbury Airport – the future Harare International Airport – in Salisbury (now Harare) in the Federation of Rhodesia and Nyasaland takes place. The federation's government had commissioned the airport in July 1956.

=== March ===
- All 11 of the Royal Navy Fleet Air Arm's Royal Naval Volunteer Reserve squadrons are disbanded due to a reduction in British defence expenditures.
- March 1 – SNCASE (or Sud-Est) and SNCASO (or Sud-Ouest) merge to form Sud Aviation.
- March 4–15 – A United States Navy blimp sets a duration record for a non-rigid airship, traveling 9,448 miles (15,205 km) in 264 hours 12 minutes.
- March 5 – A Blackburn Beverley C Mark I heavy transport aircraft of No. 53 Squadron, Royal Air Force, crashes in the village of Sutton Wick, then in Berkshire, England, killing 18 of the 22 people on board and two people on the ground.
- March 11 – A Flying Tiger Line Lockheed Super Constellation sets a new payload record for a commercial aircraft, carrying 41,749 pounds (18,937 kg) on a flight between Newark, New Jersey, and Burbank, California.
- March 14 – The Vickers Viscount G-ALWE, operating as British European Airways Flight 411, crashes into a house in Wythenshawe, England, while on approach to Manchester Airport. All 20 people on board die, as do two people in the house.
- March 17 – The Philippine Air Force Douglas C-47 Skytrain Mt. Pinatubo crashes on the slopes of Mount Manunggal on Cebu in the Philippines, killing 25 of the 26 people on board. Among the dead are President of the Philippines Ramon Magsaysay, other high-ranking Philippine government officials, and former Philippine Senator Tomas Cabili; the only survivor is Philippine Herald newspaper correspondent Nestor Mata.
- March 22 – A United States Air Force Boeing C-97 Stratofreighter with 67 people aboard disappears during a flight from Wake Island to Japan. No trace of the aircraft has been found.

=== April ===
- April 6 – Olympic Airways is created by the shipping magnate Aristotle Onassis from the ashes of bankrupt Greek state airline T.A.E.
- April 11 – North American Aviation is issued a preliminary contract to build prototypes of the XF-108 long-range interceptor aircraft for the U.S. Air Force.
- April 15 – A TAMSA Consolidated C-87 Liberator Express transport aircraft (registration XA-KUN) converted for use as a civilian cargo aircraft crashes into a street in Mérida, Mexico, shortly after takeoff from Mérida-Rejón Airport, killing a child on the ground and the plane's entire crew of three. Among the dead is the Mexican actor and singer Pedro Infante, who had been co-piloting the plane.
- April 22 – The Glenn L. Martin Company renames itself the Martin Company.
- April 25 – The attack aircraft carriers USS Forrestal (CVA-59) and USS Lake Champlain (CVA-39) are among elements of the United States Sixth Fleet which make a high-speed dash to the eastern Mediterranean Sea to demonstrate support for the government of King Hussein of Jordan against Arab nationalist opposition which the United States believes supports the spread of communism.
- April 28 – The German World War II ace Heinz Bär dies in the crash of an LF-1 Zaunkönig at Braunschweig-Waggum, West Germany. He had finished World War II in May 1945 as its top jet ace with 16 kills in the Messerschmitt Me 262, the eighth-ranking German ace with 220 total victories, and second only to Hans-Joachim Marseille in the number of British and American aircraft shot down.

=== May ===
- The national airline of Ecuador, Ecuatoriana de Aviación, is founded. It will begin flight operations in August.
- May 1 – An Eagle Aviation Vickers VC.1 Viking crashes into trees near Blackbushe Airport in Yateley, Hampshire, England, killing 34 of the 35 people on board.
- May 10 – The wreckage of Trans-Canada Air Lines Flight 810, a Canadair North Star, is found on Mount Slesse, near Chilliwack, British Columbia, Canada. The airliner had been missing since December 9, 1956. All 62 people on board had died in the crash.
- May 13 – While returning to Narsarsuaq Air Base in Greenland from a Distant Early Warning Line site in white-out conditions, a United States Overseas Airlines Douglas DC-4, registration N68736, hits the Greenland ice sheet at an altitude of 5,900 ft (1,798 m) in an area where the air crew's navigation chart indicates the ice sheet's altitude is 5,000 ft (1,524 m). Two crew members die; the seriously injured first officer is rescued.
- May 15 – A Royal Air Force Vickers Valiant drops the first British hydrogen bomb, over Kiritimati.
- May 22 – A United States Air Force B-36 Peacemaker ferrying a Mark 17 thermonuclear bomb from Biggs Air Force Base in El Paso, Texas, to Kirtland Air Force Base in Albuquerque, New Mexico, accidentally drops the bomb 4.5 miles (7.2 km) south of the Kirtland control tower and 0.3 miles (0.48 km) west of Sandia Base while on approach to Kirtland. The weapon is destroyed by the detonation of its high-explosive material, creating a crater 12 feet (3.7 m) deep and 25 feet (7.6 m) in diameter and nuclear material is released into the environment, but no nuclear explosion occurs.

=== June ===
- Middle East Airlines leases an Avro York cargo aircraft.
- June 1 – East Germany merges the headquarters of its air force, the Luftstreitkräfte der Nationalen Volksarmee ("Air Forces of the National People's Army") with those of its Luftverteidigung (air defense) force, forming a new headquarters called the Kommando LSK/LV ("Air Force/Air Defense Command").
- June 2 – In Manhigh I, the first flight of the United States Air Force's Project Manhigh, Air Force Captain Joseph Kittinger sets a new world balloon altitude record of 29,500 meters (96,800 feet), breaking Auguste Piccard's record set in May 1931.
- June 7
  - Executing a zoom climb after a low-altitude pass during a high-speed demonstration flight at Hensley Field in Dallas, Texas, for a graduating class from the Naval Postgraduate School, a Vought F8U-1 Crusader fighter flown by a Chance Vought Aircraft pilot disintegrates, killing the pilot. The aircraft's wreckage explodes violently at low altitude over Main Street in adjacent Grand Prairie, Texas, inflicting minor injuries on several bystanders.
  - Two pilots making a ferry flight of a Cessna 310 from Oakland, California, to Honolulu, Hawaii, complete the first successful flight from Oakland to Hawaii in a light plane since World War II. They complete the 2,442-mile (3,930 km) flight from Oakland Airport to Honolulu International Airport in 13 hours 51 minutes.
- June 15 – German-born American pilot Peter Gluckmann, dubbed "The Flying Watchmaker" by the press, takes off from San Carlos, California, and makes an approximately 2,300-mile (3,700 km) solo flight to Honolulu in a Beechcraft Bonanza in 15 hours 41 minutes. It is the first leg of what he plans as the first-ever round-trip to Hawaii in a light plane. After a weeklong "vacation" in Hawaii, he plans to attempt his return to San Carlos.
- June 22–23 – After a weeklong "vacation" in Hawaii, Peter Gluckmann completes his round trip with a solo flight from Honolulu to San Carlos, California, in a Beechcraft Bonanza, becoming the first person to make a round trip to Hawaii in a light plane. The 2,300-mile (3,700 km) return flight to San Carlos encounters strong headwinds and takes 19 hours 2 minutes.
- June 28 – The Moroccan airline Royal Air Maroc—Compagnie Nationale de Transports Aériens renames itself Royal Air Maroc.

=== July ===
- During an emergency evacuation rehearsal, Dwight D. Eisenhower becomes the first President of the United States to fly in a helicopter. The aircraft is piloted from the White House in Washington, D.C. to Camp David in Maryland by a U.S. Air Force officer.
- July 16
  - The Lockheed 1049E Super Constellation Neutron (PH-LKT), operating as KLM Flight 844, crashes into Cenderawasih Bay off the Biak Islands in Netherlands New Guinea, just after takeoff from Biak-Mokmer Airport while turning at low altitude to make a low-level pass over the airport. Fifty-eight of the 68 people on board die.
  - Flying a Vought F8U-1P Crusader photographic reconnaissance aircraft, United States Marine Corps Major John H. Glenn sets a North American transcontinental speed record, flying from Los Alamitos, California, to Floyd Bennett Field in Brooklyn, New York, nonstop in 3 hours, 28 minutes, 50 seconds, at an average speed of 723.517 mph (1,164.388 km/h) with three aerial refuelings.
- July 19 – A U.S. Air Force Northrop F-89J Scorpion launches a live AIR-2 Genie ("Ding Dong") unguided nuclear air-to-air missile. It is the only detonation of a Genie.
- July 28 – A United States Air Force C-124 Globemaster II carrying three nuclear bombs over the Atlantic Ocean jettisons two of the bombs after experiencing a loss of power. The bombs are never recovered.
- July 31 – The Distant Early Warning (DEW) Line, a chain of radar stations designed to warn the United States and Canada of Soviet bombers approaching North America, begins operations.

=== August ===
- An experimental Fleet Air Arm flight of Supermarine Scimitars forms at Royal Naval Air Station Ford, the first unit to be equipped with the aircraft. The Scimitar is the Royal Navy's first transonic swept-wing aircraft as well as its first aircraft capable of carrying a nuclear weapon.
- The national airline of Ecuador, Ecuatoriana de Aviación, begins flight operations.
- August 1
  - The North American Aerospace Defense Command (NORAD) is formed to co-ordinate U.S. and Canadian air defense.
  - A United States Navy Douglas A3D Skywarrior flies 2,438 miles (3,924 km) from Hawaii to California in 4 hours 12 minutes, a record time for an eastward flight between Hawaii and California.
- August 19–20 – In Manhigh II, the second flight of the United States Air Force's Project Manhigh, Air Force Major David Simons sets a new world balloon altitude record of 30,942 meters (101,516 feet), breaking Joseph Kittinger's record set in June. Simons is aloft for 32 hours.
- August 21 – The U.S. Air Force formally cancels the XF-103 Mach 3 interceptor aircraft program.
- August 28 – A rocket-boosted Royal Air Force English Electric Canberra sets a new world altitude record of 70,308 ft (21,430 m).

=== September ===
- September 7 – A United States Marine Corps helicopter transports a President of the United States for the first time, when the commanding officer of Marine Helicopter Squadron One (HMX-1), Virgil D. Olson, flies Dwight D. Eisenhower from Newport, Rhode Island to the White House in Washington, D.C. The flight begins the Marine Corps's association with presidential helicopter transportation, which it shares with the United States Army until 1976 before taking exclusive responsibility.
- September 12 – The United States and Canada establish the North American Air Defense Command (NORAD), integrating the headquarters of the U.S. Continental Air Defense Command and the Royal Canadian Air Force's Air Defense Command and responsible for the defense of North America against air attack. NORAD will be renamed the North American Aerospace Defense Command in March 1981.
- September 29 – Trans World Airlines inaugurates service via the polar route from Los Angeles, California, to London, England, using the Lockheed L-1649A Starliner.
- September 30 – Air Austria and Austrian Airways merge to form Austrian Airlines.

=== October ===
- Ansett Airways (the future Ansett Australia) is renamed Ansett-ANA.
- October 4
  - The Soviet Union's Sputnik 1, the world's first artificial satellite, is launched into orbit
  - The Avro CF-105 Arrow rolls out from the Malton plant in Toronto, Ontario, Canada.
- October 11 – A United States Air Force B-47 Stratojet crashes during takeoff at Homestead Air Force Base, Florida, after one of its tires explodes. The bomber catches fire after the crash, destroying a nuclear bomb aboard the aircraft, but no nuclear explosion occurs.
- October 23 – The British European Airways Vickers Viscount 802 G-AOJA crashes while landing in rain and low clouds at Nutts Corner Airport in Belfast, Northern Ireland, killing all seven people on board.
- October 27 – Pioneering Italian aircraft designer Giovanni Caproni dies.

=== November ===
- Delivery of the Handley Page Victor strategic bomber to the Royal Air Force begins.
- November 4 – A Romanian government Ilyushin Il-14P carrying some of the most prominent officials of the Romanian Workers' Party – including Grigore Preoteasa, Leonte Răutu, Chivu Stoica, Alexandru Moghioroș, Ștefan Voitec, and Nicolae Ceaușescu – strikes treetops in fog and crashes while on approach to Moscow's Vnukovo Airport in the Soviet Union, killing four of the 16 people on board. Preoteasa, Romania's Minister of Foreign Affairs, is among the dead, and Ceaușescu, Romania's future dictator, is injured.
- November 6 – A prototype of the Bristol Britannia crashes in Downend, England, during a test flight, killing all 15 people on board and injuring one person on the ground.
- November 7 – The Security Resources Panel of the President's Science Advisory Committee, chaired by Horace Rowan Gaither, submits "Deterrence & Survival in the Nuclear Age" – commonly referred to as the "Gaither Report" – to President Dwight D. Eisenhower. Among other things, the report finds that there is "little likelihood of SAC's [i.e., the U.S. Strategic Air Command's] bombers surviving" a Soviet intercontinental ballistic missile (ICBM) attack "since there was no way to detect an incoming attack until the first [ICBM] warhead landed," and it recommends a significant strengthening of U.S. strategic offensive and defensive military capabilities.
- November 8 – The Pan American World Airways Boeing 377 Stratocruiser 10-29 Clipper Romance of the Skies, operating as Flight 7, crashes in the Pacific Ocean during a flight from San Francisco, California, to Honolulu in the Territory of Hawaii, killing all 44 people on board.
- November 15 – After taking off from England's Southampton Water, an Aquila Airways Short Solent flying boat develops engine trouble and crashes on the Isle of Wight while attempting to return. Forty-five of the 58 people on board die in what at the time is the second-deadliest aviation accident to have taken place in the United Kingdom and then the worst ever air disaster to occur in England.

=== December ===
- December 3 – A flight of 16 United States Air Force F-100D Super Sabres makes a 3,850-mile (6,200 km) flight from Tokyo, Japan, to Honolulu, Hawaii, in 6 1/2 hours, setting both a time and distance record for a flight by a large formation of single-engine jet aircraft.
- December 12 – In Operation Firewall, U.S. Air Force Major Adrian Drew sets a new world speed record, in a modified F-101A Voodoo, of 1,207 mph (1,942 km/h) over Edwards Air Force Base, California.
- December 21 – The first aircraft carrier designed as such to be launched in France, Clemenceau, is launched by the Brest Arsenal at Brest.

== First flights ==
- Stits SA-7 Skycoupe

=== January ===
- Cessna 210
- January 23 – Nord 1500-02 Griffon II

=== February ===
- February 17 – Bell X-14 - first hovering flight

=== March ===
- March 2 –Thruxton Jackaroo
- March 7 – Antonov An-10 (NATO reporting name "Cat")
- March 14 – Blume Bl.500
- March 15 – Dassault Étendard VI
- March 28 – Canadair Argus
- March 31 –Hurel-Dubois Miles HDM.105
- March 31 – Bréguet 1100

=== April ===
- April 2 – Short SC.1
- April 4 – English Electric P.1B, first fully developed prototype of the English Electric Lightning
- April 17 – Nord N 3202
- April 23 – Tupolev Tu-116

=== May ===
- May 14 – Miles M.100 Student
- May 14 – Bréguet 902 Cinzano
- May 14 – SNECMA Atar Volant
- May 16 – Saunders-Roe SR.53

=== July ===
- July 4 – Ilyushin Il-18
- July 9 – Aviation Traders Accountant
- July 16 – Aerotécnica AC-14
- July 26 – Bréguet 1001 Taon

=== August ===
- August 13 – Vertol VZ-2

=== September ===
- September 4 – Lockheed JetStar
- September 12 – Cessna 150
- September 23 – DINFIA IA 45

=== November ===
- November 6 – Fairey Rotodyne
- November 15 – Tupolev Tu-114 Rossiya (NATO reporting name "Cleat")
- November 20 – Hiller VZ-1 Pawnee
- November 26 – Piaggio P.166

=== December ===
- December 3 – Tipsy Nipper
- December 6 – Lockheed L-188 Electra
- December 10 – Aermacchi MB-326
- December 20 – Boeing 707
- December 23– DINFIA IA 46

== Entered service ==
- Hiller ROE Rotorcycle with the United States Marine Corps
- Stits SA-7 Skycoupe
- Stits SA-8 Skeeto

=== February ===
- February 1 – Bristol Britannia with BOAC

=== March ===
- March 8 – Grumman F11F Tiger, the world's first carrier-based supersonic fighter, with United States Navy Attack Squadron 156 (VA-156)
- March 25 – Vought F8U Crusader with VF-32 Swordsmen

=== May ===
- McDonnell F-101A Voodoo with USAF

=== June ===
- June 28 – Boeing KC-135 Stratotanker with 93d Air Refueling Squadron

=== November ===
- November 19 – Fokker Friendship with Aer Lingus

== Retirements ==
- North American FJ-2 Fury by the United States Marine Corps
- Vought F7U Cutlass by the United States Navy

== Deadliest crash ==
The deadliest crash of this year was Maritime Central Airways Flight 315, a Douglas DC-4 which crashed in Issoudun, Quebec, Canada on 11 August, killing all 79 people on board.
