= Ray Stits =

American aircraft designer

- Born: June 20, 1921
- Died: June 8, 2015 (aged 93); Indian Hills, California
- Citizenship: United States
- Occupations: Aircraft mechanic, pilot, aircraft designer
- Spouse: Edith Stits
- Children: David Stits and Don Stits

Raymond M. Stits (20 June 1921 – 8 June 2015) was an American inventor, homebuilt aircraft designer, aircraft mechanic and pilot. He designed the Stits SA-2A Sky Baby, which was the world's smallest aircraft in 1952, developed the Poly-Fiber aircraft fabric covering system and was the founder of Experimental Aircraft Association Chapter 1.

David Gustafson, a Flabob Airport historian, wrote of Stits, "few people outside of the Poberezny family had as much influence on the early home built aircraft movement as Ray Stits."

== Life ==
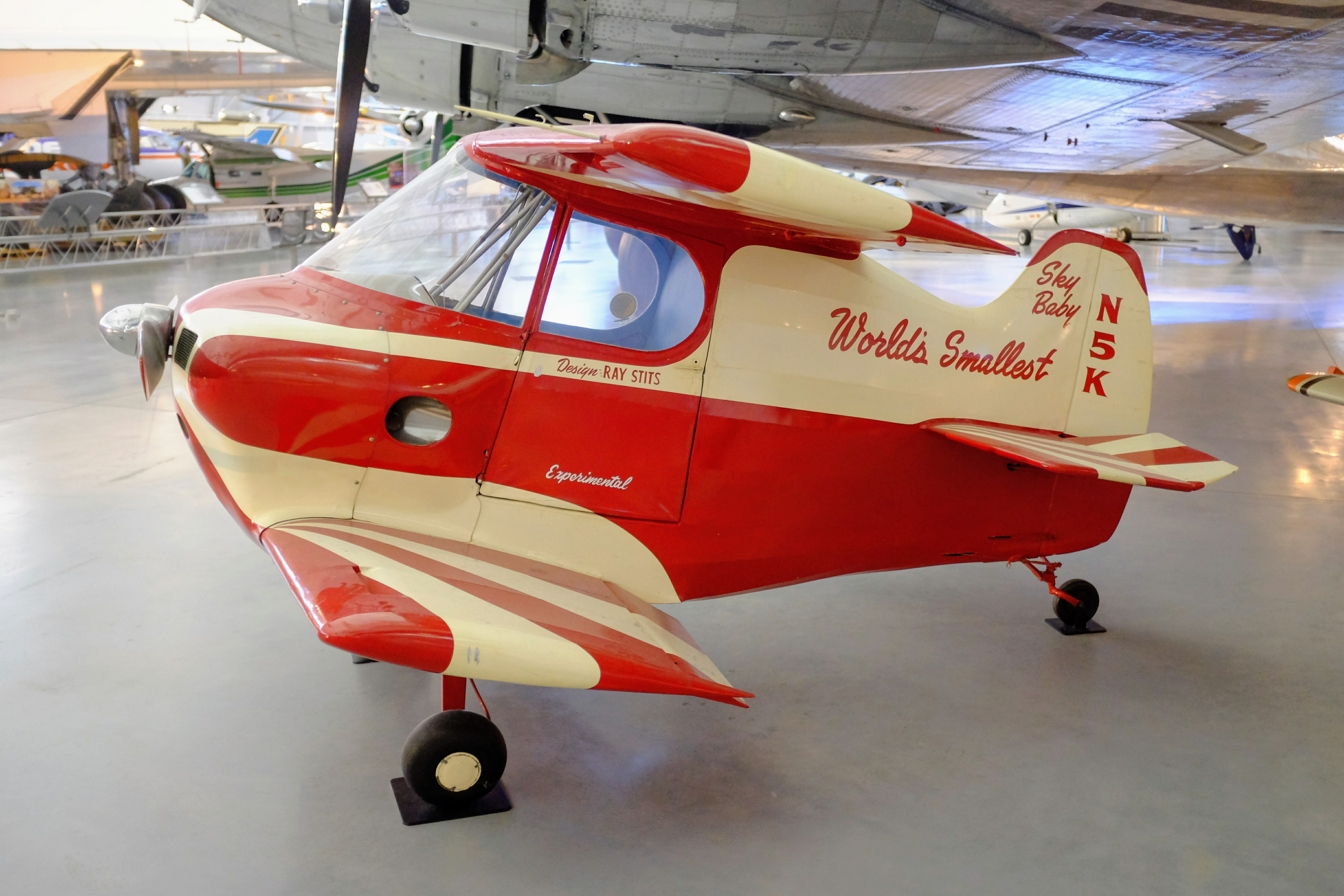
Stits Sky Baby

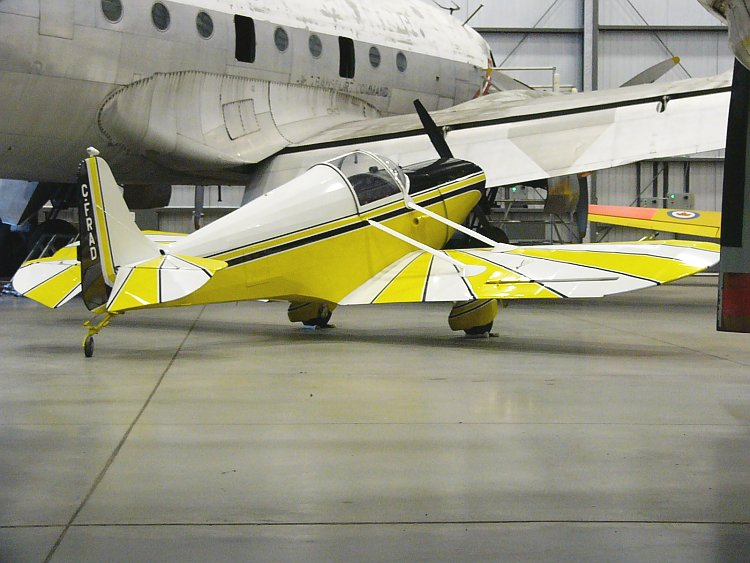
Stitts SA-3A Playboy in the Canada Aviation and Space Museum

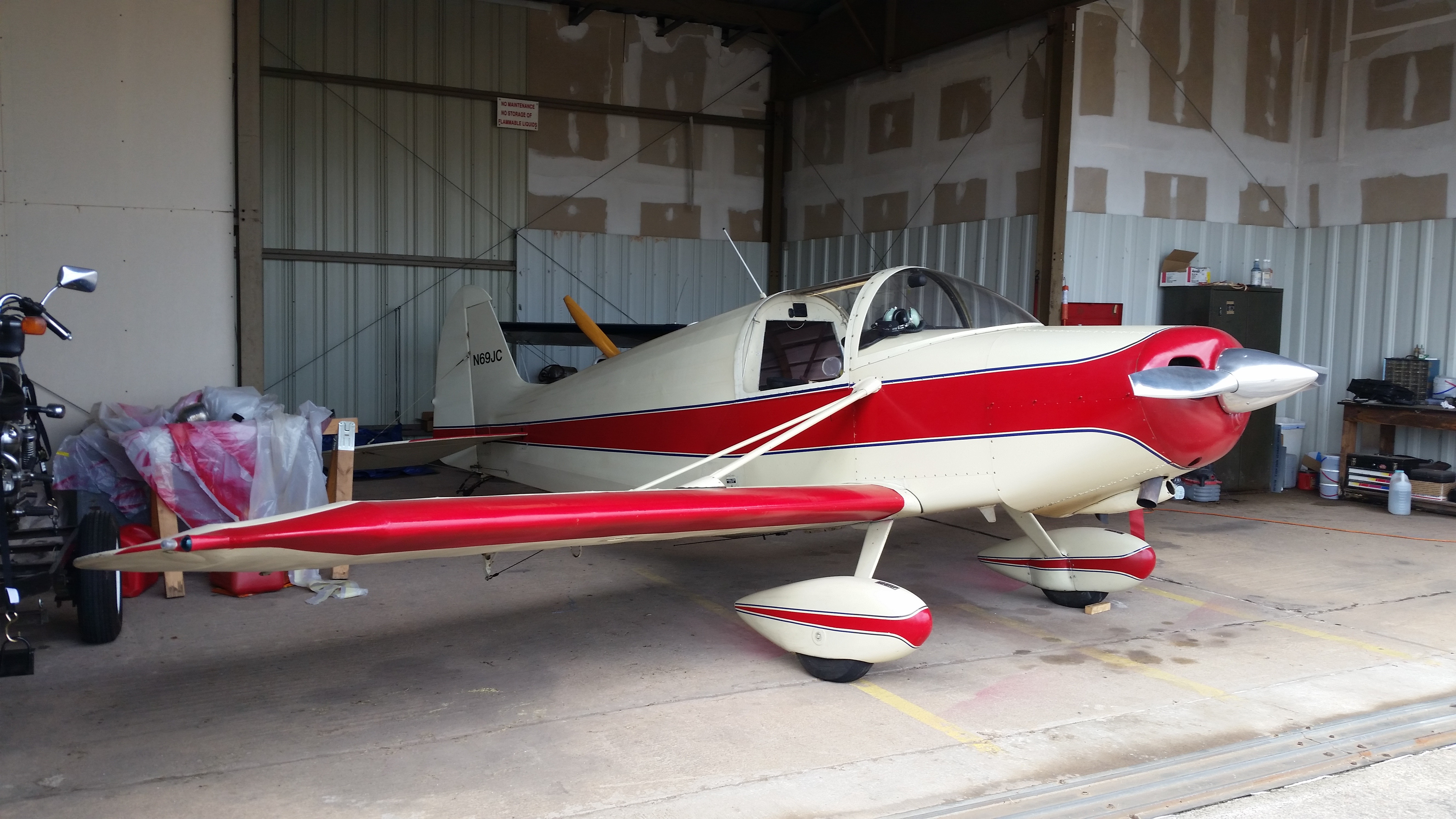
Stits SA-3B Two-Seat Playboy

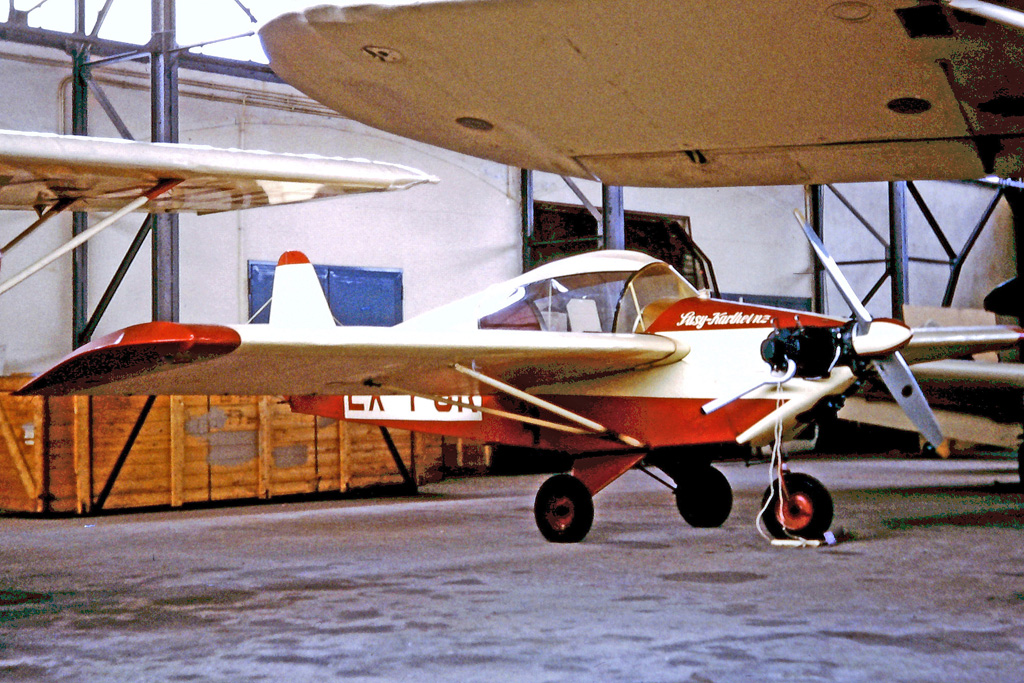
Stits SA-5 Flut-R-Bug

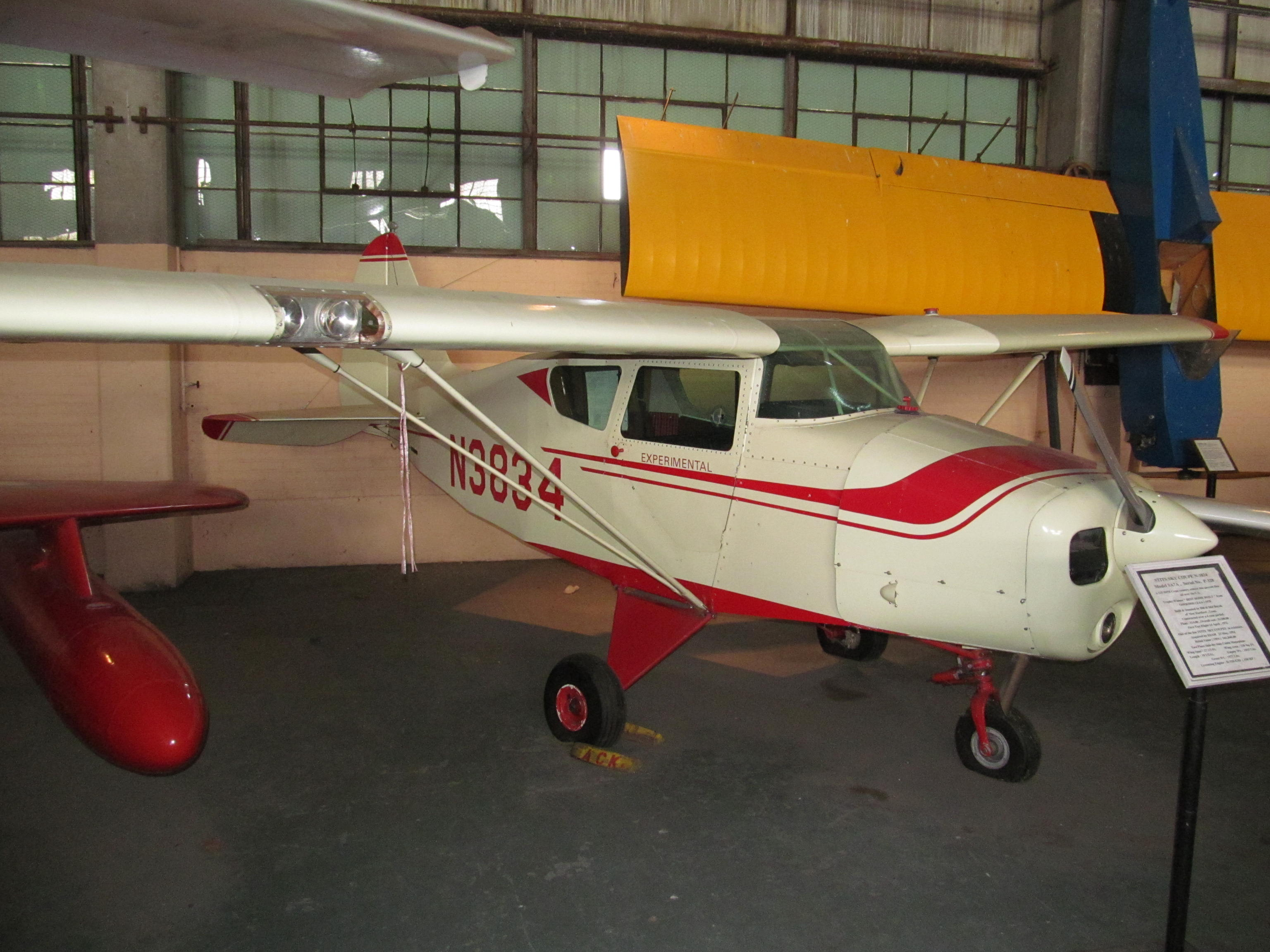
Stits SA-7 Sky-Coupe

Stits served as an aircraft mechanic in the United States Army Air Forces during the Second World War. He served in the mainland US, with distinction.

In 1953, Stits convinced Experimental Aircraft Association founder Paul Poberezny that local chapters would benefit the homebuit aircraft movement and founded Chapter 1 at Flabob Airport in Rubidoux, California.

As the result of a flash-burn accident while burning some scrap aircraft fabric, he designed the Stits Aircraft Covering System, also called Poly-Fiber, which allowed the aircraft industry to stop using the highly flammable combination of Grade "A" cotton fabric treated with nitrate dope and instead move to polyurethane finishes on polyester fabric. In 1992, Stits sold the company to Jon Goldenbaum, but it remains based at Flabob Airport.

Stits and his wife, Edith, had two sons, David and Don. In the 1970s and 1980s they lived in Jurupa Hills, in the Jurupa Valley, California, before moving to the nearby Indian Hills. At that home, Stits built a helicopter pad on the highest hill in the area.

Stits' son, David Stits, served in the 82nd Airborne Division in the Vietnam War and later died in an aircraft accident.

Stits was awarded both a Federal Aviation Administration Master Mechanic award and a Master Pilot Award each for 50 years of accident-free operations.

At age 90 Stits was still flying and owned a Cessna 162 Skycatcher light-sport aircraft. He died at age 93 in Indian Hills, California.

== Aircraft designs ==
Stits' first aircraft design was the Stits SA-1A Junior. The aircraft was the world's smallest monoplane at the time and was designed as the result of a discussion at Kellogg Field in Battle Creek, Michigan in 1948, about whether it would be possible to design an airplane with a wingspan smaller than Steve Wittman's racer's 13 ft (4.0 m) span. Other pilots claimed it was not possible, so Stits designed the Junior, with a wingspan of 8.83 ft (2.7 m). That aircraft was damaged in an off-airport landing and later scrapped. He went on to design the biplane SA-2A Sky Baby, with a wingspan of 7.17 ft (2.2 m). The Sky Baby flew 25 hours before being retired to be displayed in a series of museums. It is now in the Steven F. Udvar-Hazy Center.

Stits received a good deal of interest in his SA-1A and SA-2A designs from pilots interested in building copies of them, but he felt the aircraft were too demanding to fly, with their high wing loadings and fast approach speeds. Instead in 1953, he designed the much more conventional Stits Playboy, as an aircraft that low-experience pilots could safely fly. The Playboy was later developed by Richard VanGrunsven into the VanGrunsven RV-1 which was the first in the highly successful Van's Aircraft line.

Stits went on to design a total of 15 aircraft and become a source of both plans and aircraft parts for the designs.

His Stits SA-7 Sky-Coupe was an attempt to design a larger, high-wing aircraft, but it resulted in an aircraft Stits was not pleased with and it was not commercially successful.

The Stits SA-11A Playmate was designed in response to an EAA challenge to create a trailerable aircraft.

== Aircraft ==
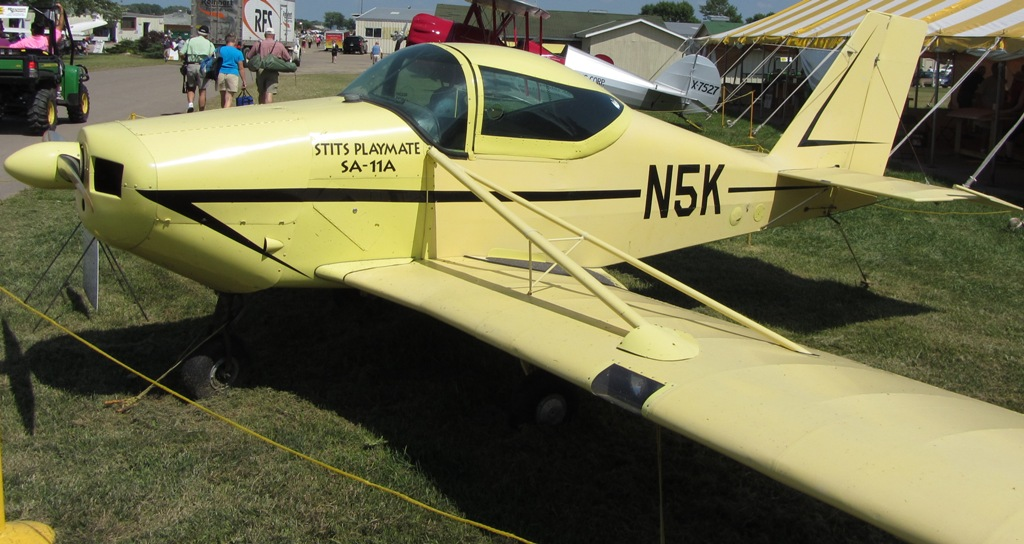
Stits SA-11A Playmate

Summary of aircraft designed by Stits:

- SA-1A Junior
- DS-1 Baby Bird
- SA-2A Sky Baby
- SA-3A Playboy
- SA-3B Two Seat Playboy
- SA-4A Executive
- SA-5 Flut-R-Bug
- SA-7 Skycoupe
- SA-8 Skeeto
- SA-11A Playmate
