= Stits SA-7 Sky-Coupe =

Stits SA-7 Skycoupe
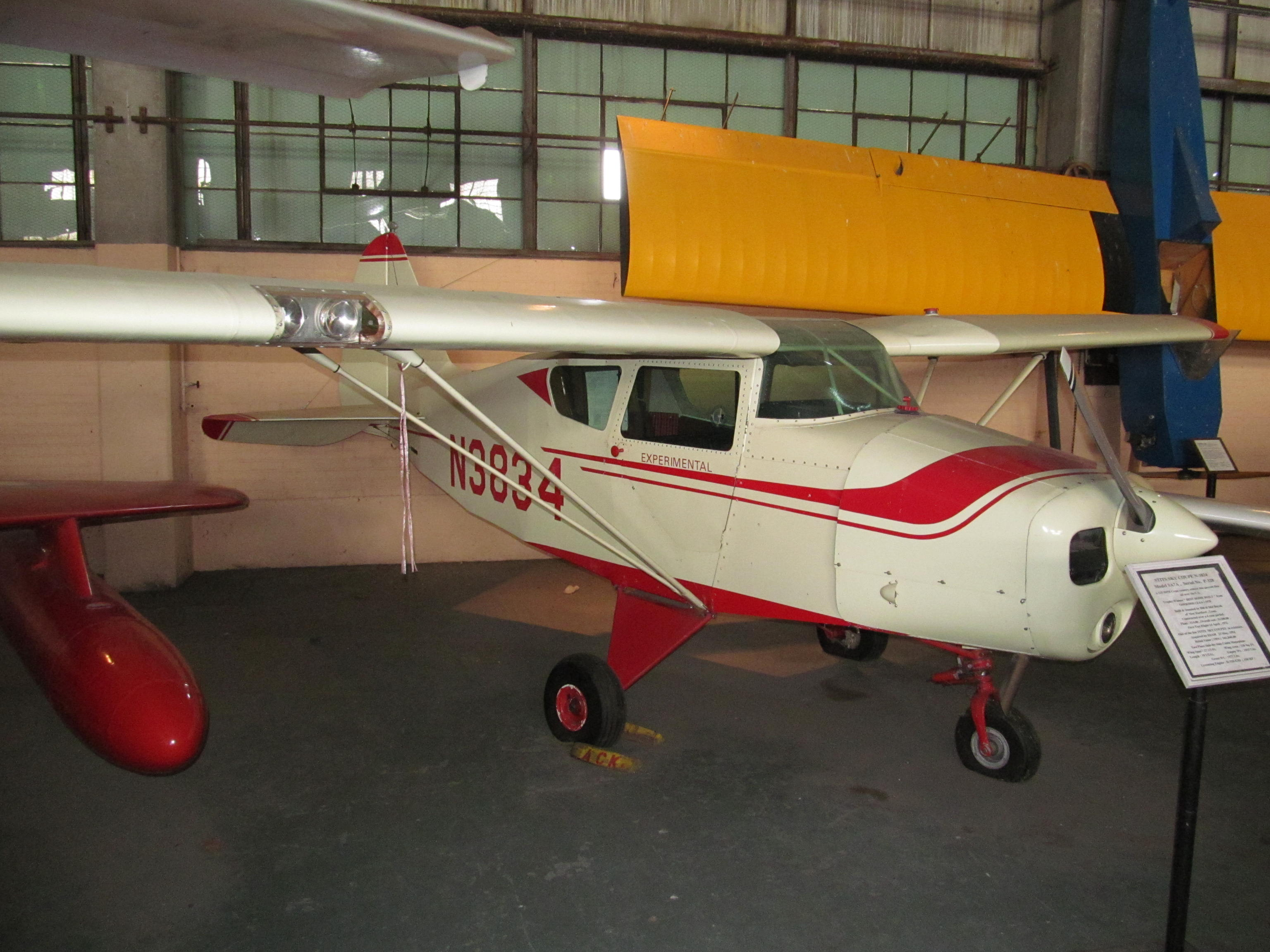

General information
- Type: Homebuilt aircraft
- National origin: United States
- Manufacturer: Stits Aircraft
- Designer: Ray Stits, Harold Dale

History
- Introduction date: 1957
- First flight: 1957

The Stits SA-7 Skycoupe is a two-seat, side-by-side seating, high wing homebuilt aircraft designed by Ray Stits.

== Design ==
Ray Stits designed 14 different homebuilt aircraft kits that were some of the first available to the general public built in quantity. Stits is also known to the general public as the maker of the Stits Junior, Stits SA-2A Sky Baby, and Stits Baby Bird, each of which was once the world's smallest aircraft. Engineer Harold Dale assisted in the certification process after completing his Dale Weejet 800.

The Skycoupe was provided as a kit with a pre-fabricated steel tube fuselage. The surfaces are fabric covered. The aircraft was designed to accommodate engines ranging from 60 to 90 hp (45 to 67 kW).

== Variants ==
SA-7A
SA-7B
Powered by a Continental C85
SA-7C
SA-7D
Updated with a squared off swept tail configuration.
SA-9A
A type certificated version.

== Specifications Stits SA-7B Sky-Coupe ==
Data from Jane's All the World's Aircraft 1961–62

General characteristics

- Capacity: 2
- Length: 17 ft 9 in (5.41 m)
- Wingspan: 25 ft 9 in (7.85 m)
- Height: 6 ft 6 in (1.98 m)
- Wing area: 120 sq ft (11 m^{2})
- Aspect ratio: 5:1
- Airfoil: NACA 4412
- Empty weight: 650 lb (295 kg)
- Gross weight: 1,175 lb (533 kg)
- Fuel capacity: 18 US gal (15 imp gal; 68 L)
- Powerplant: 1 × Continental C85 air-cooled flat-four, 85 hp (63 kW)

Performance

- Maximum speed: 120 kn (138 mph, 222 km/h)
- Cruise speed: 100 kn (115 mph, 185 km/h)
- Stall speed: 42 kn (48 mph, 77 km/h)
- Range: 350 nmi (400 mi, 640 km)
- Service ceiling: 12,000 ft (3,700 m)
- Rate of climb: 1,000 ft/min (5.1 m/s)

== See also ==
Related development

- Stits SA-3A Playboy
- Stits SA-8 Skeeto
