= Stits SA-2A Sky Baby =

American homebuilt aircraft

SA-2A Sky Baby
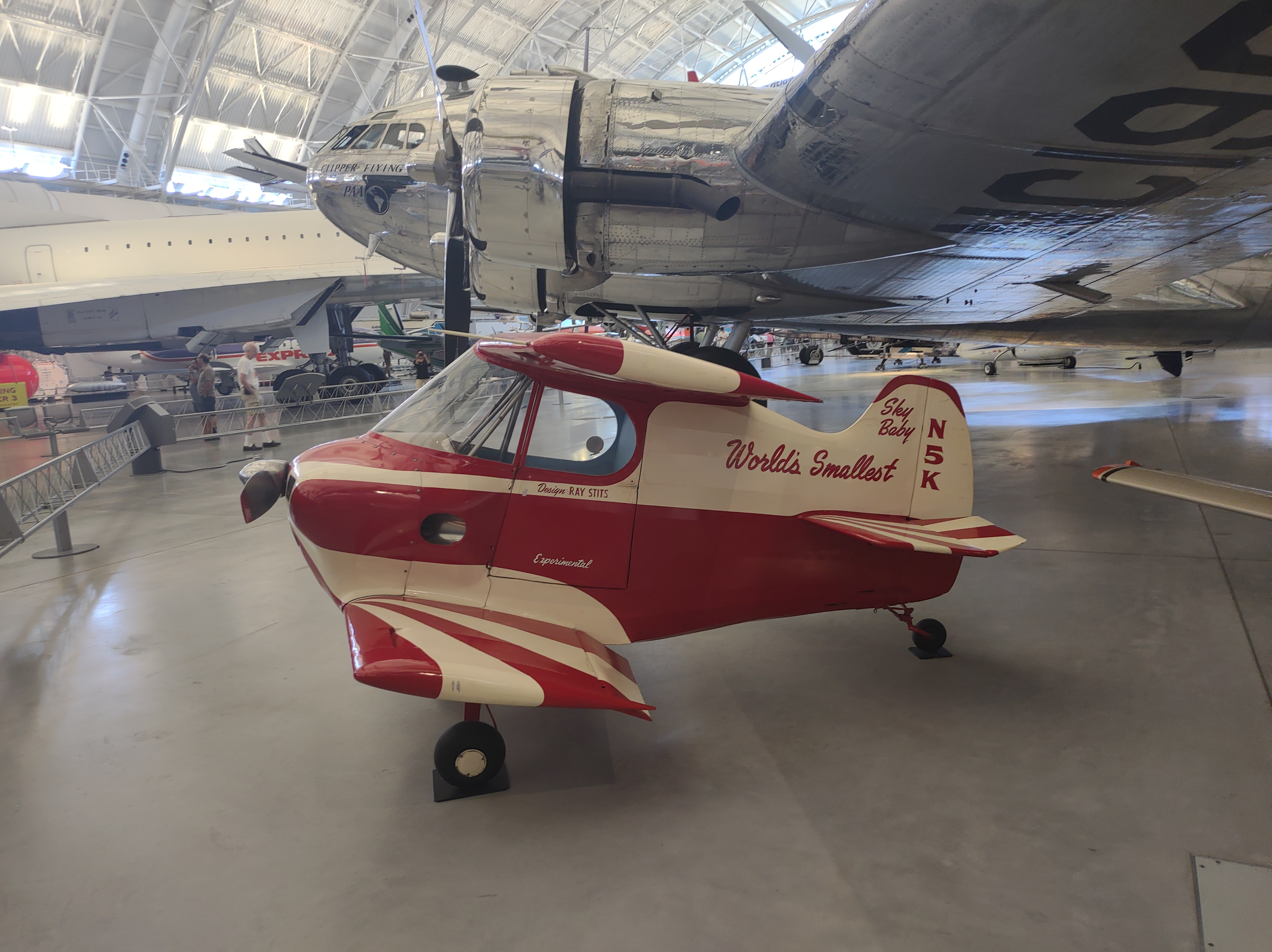
- Sky Baby on display at the Steven F. Udvar-Hazy Center

General information
- Type: Homebuilt aircraft
- National origin: United States
- Designer: Ray Stits
- Number built: 1

History
- First flight: 26 May 1952

The Stits SA-2A Sky Baby is a homebuilt aircraft designed for the challenge of claiming the title of "The World's Smallest".

== Design and development ==
The Sky Baby was designed by Ray Stits and built with Robert H. Starr as a follow-on to the Stits Junior midget racer. The aircraft is an enclosed single engine negative staggered cantilevered biplane with conventional landing gear. The fuselage is constructed of welded steel tubing with aircraft fabric covering. The upper wings have flaps, the lower wings have ailerons. Most aircraft use a flat firewall between the engine and pilot's feet, the Skybaby is configured with the pilot sitting with the engine close to the lap, and rudder pedals located under the oil sump toward the front of the cowling. The powerplant was sourced from an ERCO Ercoupe, modified with water injection to produce 112 hp (84 kW).

== Operational history ==
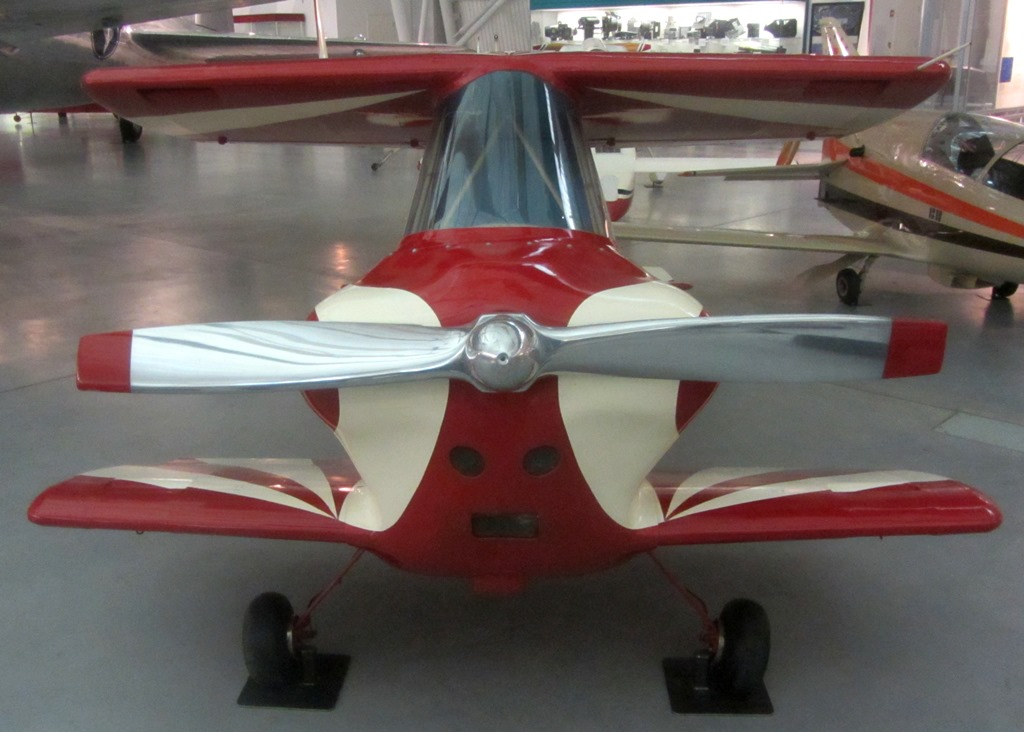
Stits SA-2A on display at the Steven F. Udvar-Hazy Center

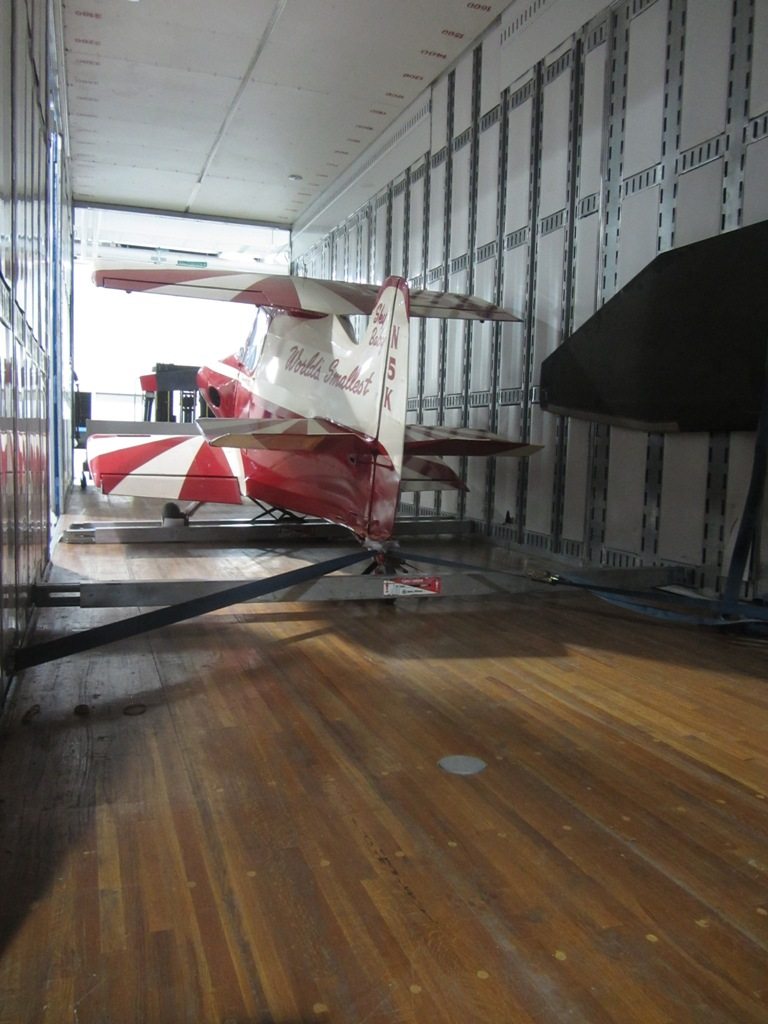
Stits Sky Baby loaded with room to spare in the Smithsonian's transport trailer at the Stephen Udvar Hazy Center

The aircraft was test flown by Robert H. Starr on 26 May 1952 at Palm Springs, California. The short coupled aircraft was originally built with tricycle landing gear, which was dropped in favor of the lighter tailwheel arrangement. The aircraft required a 170 lb (77 kg) pilot to remain within the center of gravity and was only flown by pilots Robert H. Starr and Lester Cole that met the criteria. The landing procedure uses 125 mph (201 km/h) entry patterns, with 80 mph (129 km/h) on final approach, and 55 mph (89 km/h) touchdown speeds. The aircraft performed publicity flights to promote an airshow act. It was retired in October 1952 after 25 hours of flight time.

The aircraft was eventually donated to the National Air and Space Museum for display. Ray Stits was a mechanic and Second World War fighter pilot, but claimed he was not an engineer. He went on to develop several home-built designs, including the Stits SA-3A Playboy, which would be the basis for the VanGrunsven RV-1 and thousands of Van's Aircraft.

== Aircraft on display ==
The Sky Baby was on display at the EAA Airventure Museum in Oshkosh, Wisconsin on loan from the National Air and Space Museum. In 2014, the Sky Baby was moved to the Steven F. Udvar-Hazy Center of the National Air and Space Museum, and placed on display there.

== Specifications (SA-2A) ==
Data from Sport Aviation

General characteristics

- Crew: 1
- Length: 9 ft 10 in (3.00 m)
- Wingspan: 7 ft 2 in (2.18 m)
- Height: 5 ft (1.5 m)
- Wing area: 36.5 sq ft (3.39 m^{2})
- Empty weight: 452 lb (205 kg)
- Gross weight: 666 lb (302 kg)
- Fuel capacity: 5 U.S. gallons (19 L; 4.2 imp gal)
- Powerplant: 1 × Continental C85 four cylinder, four-stroke, aircraft engine with water injection, 112 hp (84 kW)
- Propellers: 2-bladed aluminum

Performance

- Maximum speed: 190 kn (220 mph, 350 km/h)
- Cruise speed: 143 kn (165 mph, 266 km/h)
- Stall speed: 52 kn (60 mph, 97 km/h)

== See also ==
- Stits DS-1
- Starr Bumble Bee II
