= Flabob Airport =

- IATA: RIR; ICAO: KRIR; FAA LID: RIR

Summary
- Airport type: Public
- Owner: Flabob Inc. 4130 Mennes Ave, Jurupa Valley, CA 92509
- Serves: Riverside–San Bernardino–Ontario metropolitan area
- Location: Jurupa Valley, California
- Elevation AMSL: 767 ft (234 m)
- Coordinates: 33°59′20″N 117°24′36″W
- Website: www.flabobairport.org
- Interactive map of Flabob Airport

Runways
Direction	Length		Surface
Direction	ft	m	Surface
6/24	3,190	972	Asphalt
- Source: Federal Aviation Administration

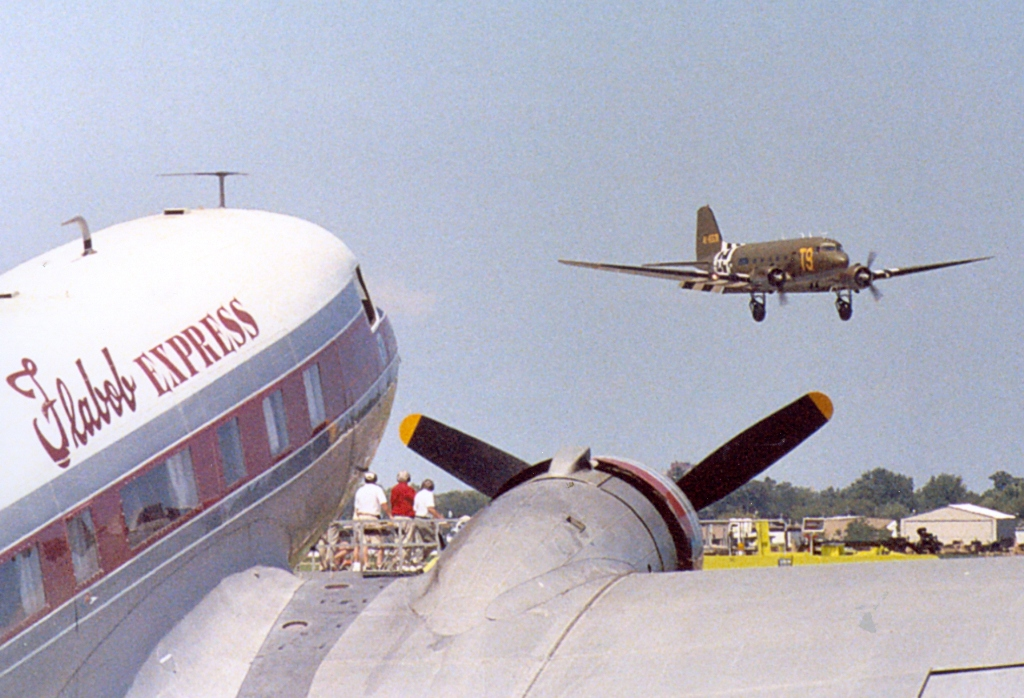
The Flabob Express

Flabob Airport (IATA: RIR, ICAO: KRIR, FAA LID: RIR) is a small public-use airport located in Jurupa Valley, California, United States, in Riverside County, seven nautical miles (11 km) northwest of the central business district of Jurupa Valley, California.

== Location and history ==
The airport is located in the city of Jurupa Valley beside the Santa Ana River. Established in 1925 by Roman Warren. Later acquired by Flavio Madariaga and Bob Bogan, the name of the airport was derived by combining the first three letters of their names.

== Facilities ==
(KRIR, RIR) Flabob Airport CTAF frequency is 122.8 (the airport is a non-towered airport and exists in Class G airspace) has a cafe (open 7 days/week), and several permanent aircraft hangars. It covers an area of 127 acres (51 ha) at an elevation of 767 feet (234 m) above mean sea level. It has one runway designated 6/24 with an asphalt surface measuring 3,190 by 50 feet (972 x 15 m).

== Operations and based aircraft ==
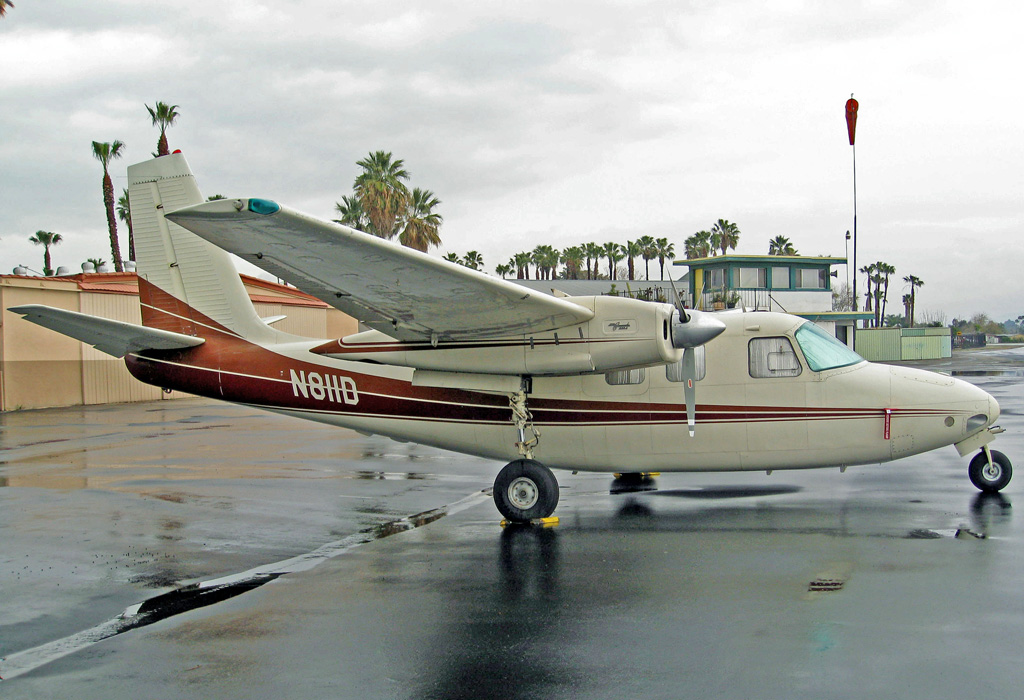
Based Aero Commander 500S in front of the Flabob control tower and hangars

For the 12-month period ending February 28, 2022, the airport had 11,300 general aviation aircraft operations, an average of 31 per day. At that time there were 127 aircraft based at this airport, 115 single-engine and 12 multi-engine.

Flabob airport is home to Experimental Aircraft Association Chapter #1, launched by Ray Stits and since joined by over 1,000 more EAA chapters worldwide. The airport is also birthplace of the Marquart MA-5 Charger airplane, and of the Polyfiber aircraft fabric company founded by Ray Stits, who also created the popular Stits Playboy homebuilt aircraft at Flabob. It is also home to the Inland Empire campus of Spartan College of Aeronautics and Technology, located in Hangar 8.
