= Stits DS-1 =

American homebuilt aircraft; world's smallest monoplane

DS-1 "Baby Bird"
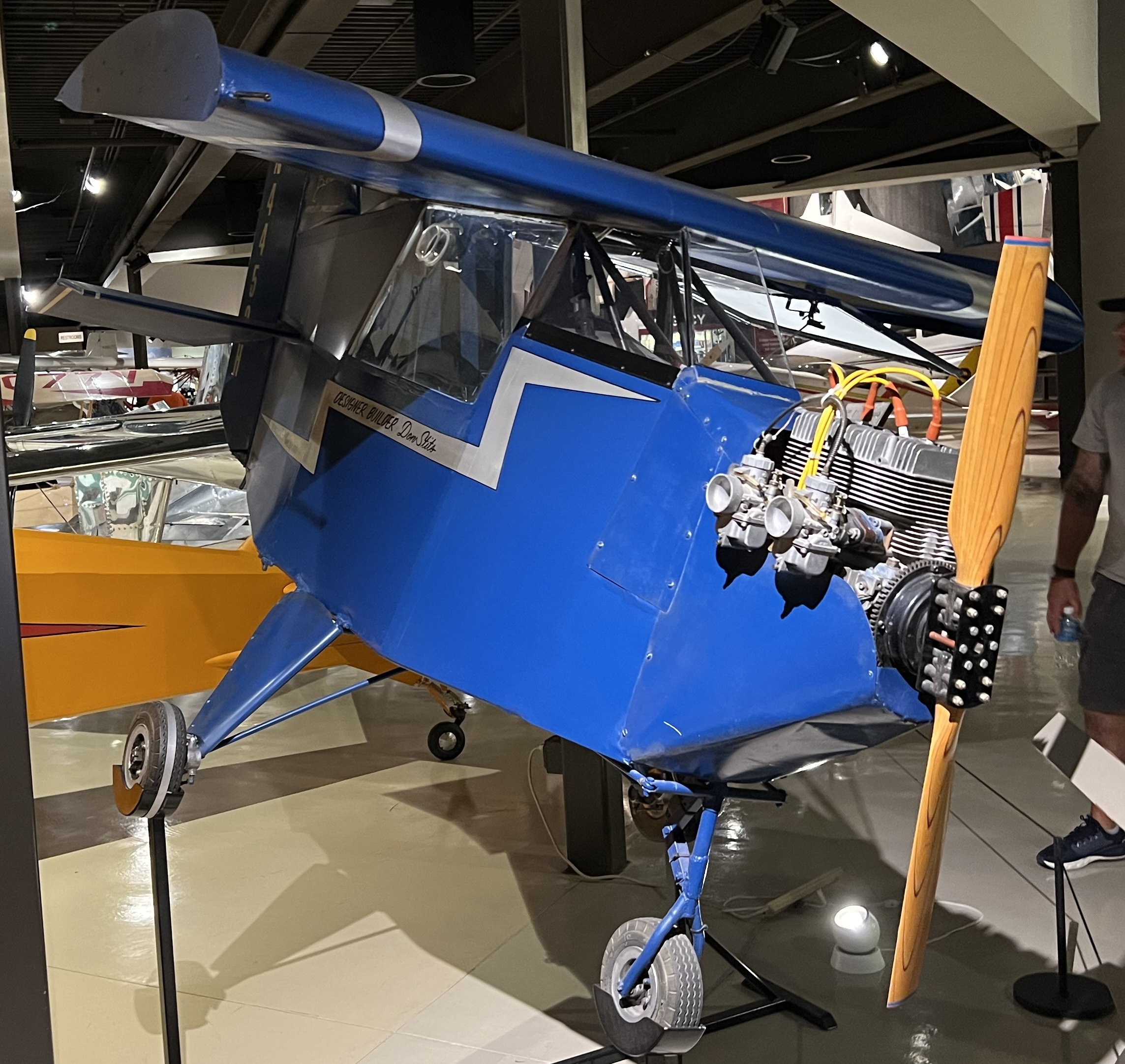
- Stits DS-1 Baby Bird

General information
- Type: Homebuilt aircraft
- National origin: United States
- Designer: Don Stits
- Number built: 1

History
- First flight: 25 August 1984

The Stits DS-1 Baby Bird is a homebuilt aircraft built to achieve a "world's smallest" status. The Baby Bird is in the Guinness Book of World Records as the “Smallest Airplane in the World.” as of 1984. The title was later defined as "world's smallest monoplane" to acknowledge Robert H. Starr's Bumble Bee II as the world's smallest biplane.

== Development ==
The DS-1 is a single-engine, single-seat highwing aircraft. Development started in 1980 to beat Ray Stits's record for world's smallest aircraft, the Stits SA-2A Sky Baby flown by Robert H. Starr. The fuselage is welded steel tubing with fabric covering. The wing is all-wood construction.

== Operational history ==
Thirty-four flights took place in 1984 with United States Navy pilot Harold Nemer at the controls.

== Specifications ==
Data from EAA

General characteristics

- Crew: 1
- Length: 11 ft (3.4 m)
- Wingspan: 6 ft 3 in (1.91 m)
- Height: 5 ft (1.5 m)
- Empty weight: 252 lb (114 kg)
- Gross weight: 425 lb (193 kg)
- Powerplant: 1 × Hirth 2 Cylinder, 55 hp (41 kW)
- Propellers: 2-bladed

Performance

- Maximum speed: 96 kn (110 mph, 180 km/h)
- Stall speed: 61 kn (70 mph, 110 km/h)

== See also ==
Aircraft of comparable role, configuration, and era

- Stits SA-2A Sky Baby
