= Robert H. Starr =

Aircraft designer and pilot

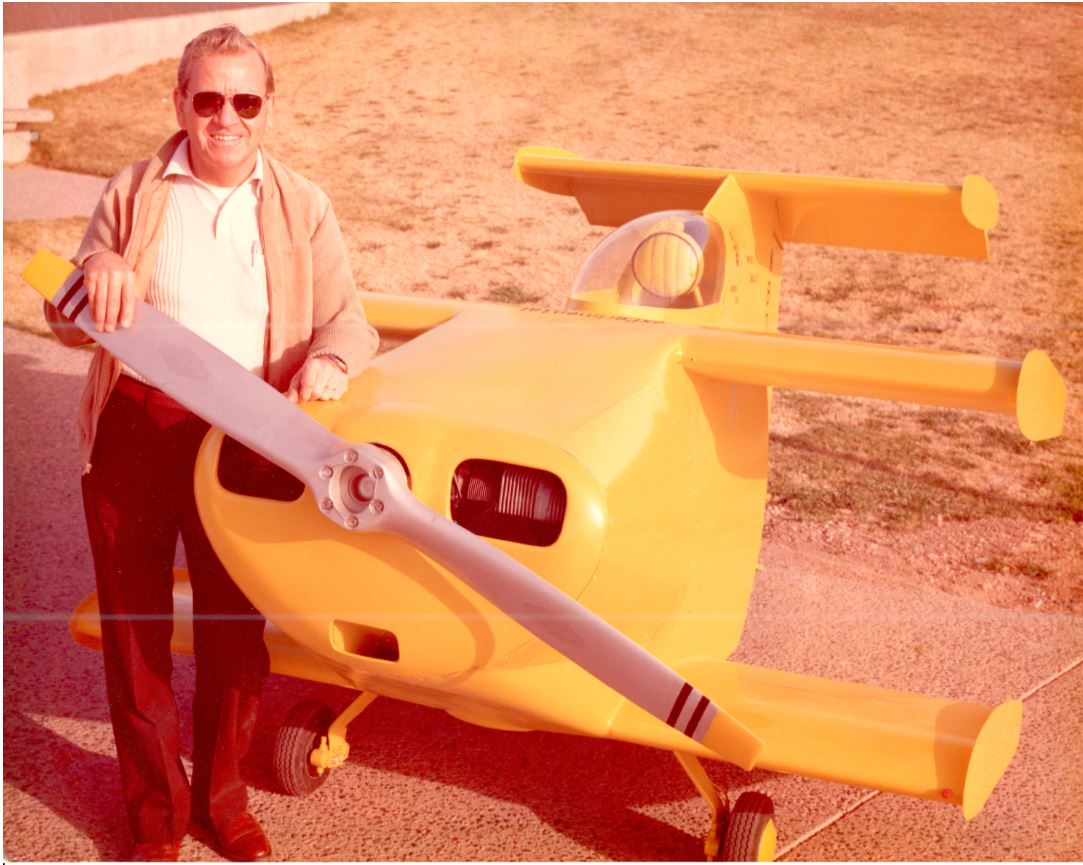
- Robert Starr with The Bumble Bee I
- Born: Robert Huie Starr; March 4, 1924; Mason, Michigan
- Died: 15 June 2009 (aged 85); Phoenix, Arizona
- Known for: Worlds' Smallest Airplane Guinness Title

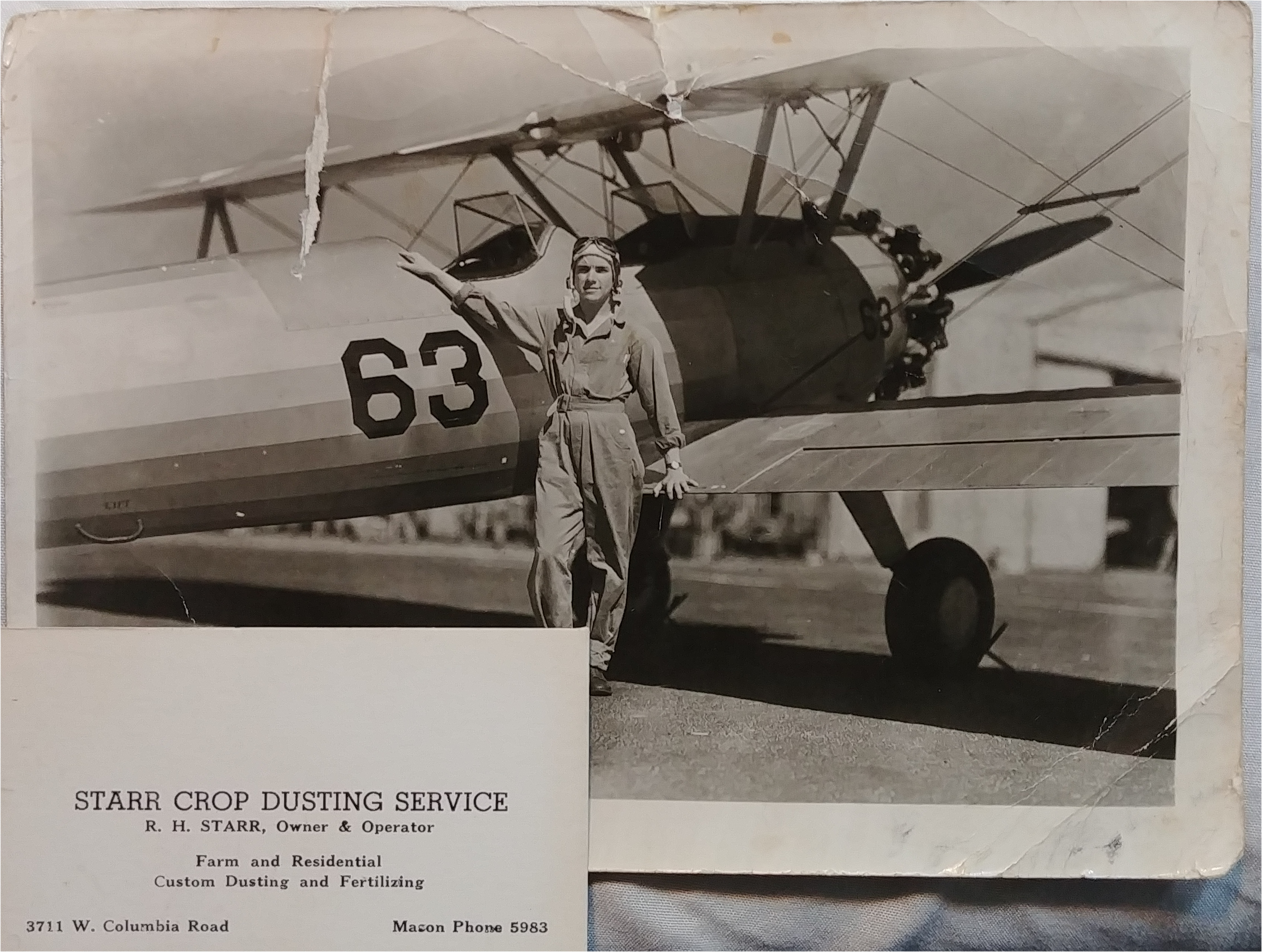
Starr crop dusting service

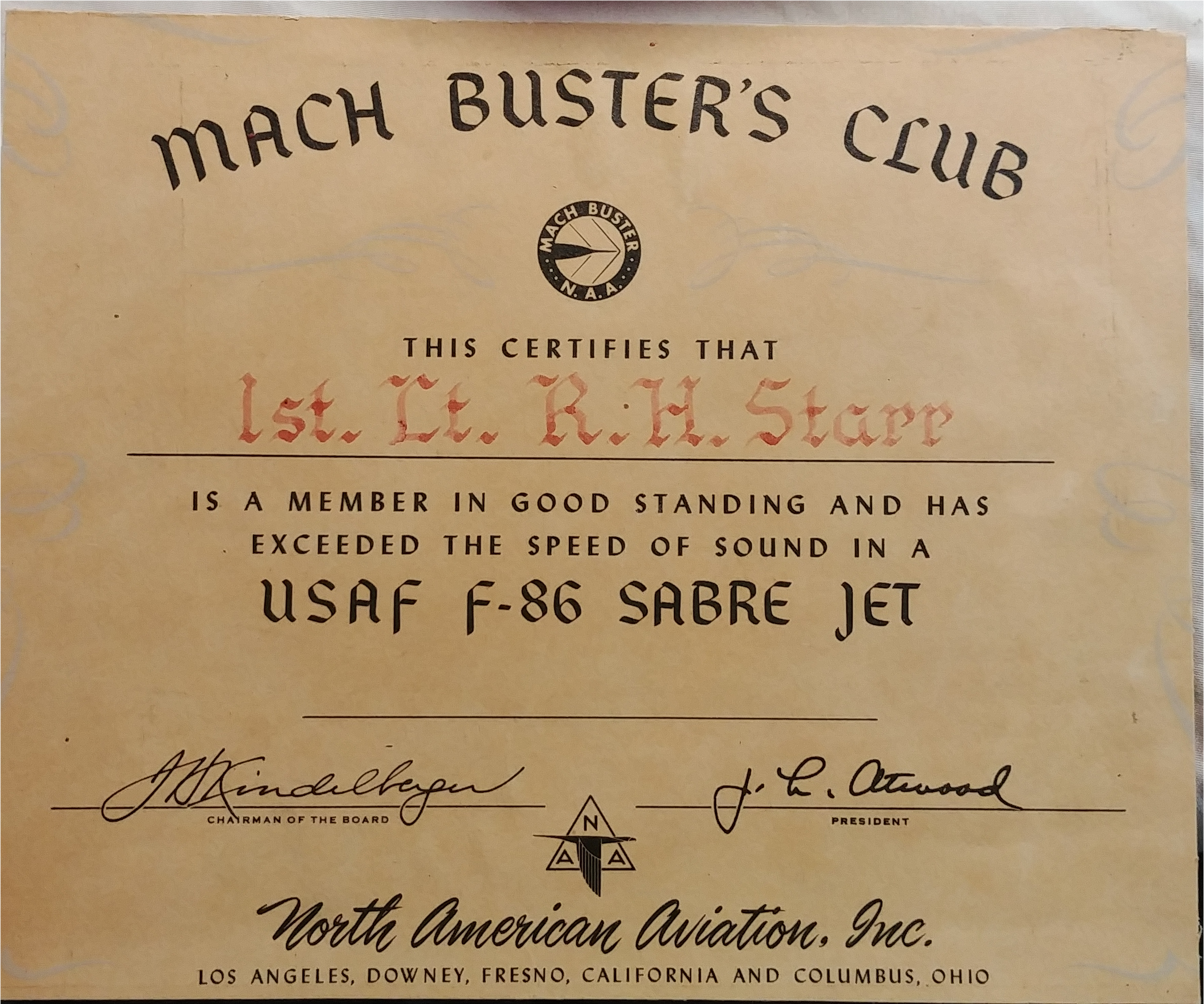
Mach One certification

Robert H. Starr (March 4, 1924 – June 15, 2009) was the designer, builder and pilot of the world's smallest piloted biplane, the Starr Bumble Bee II; the Guinness Book of Records awarded the Bumble Bee the official world record title in 1985.

== Military service ==
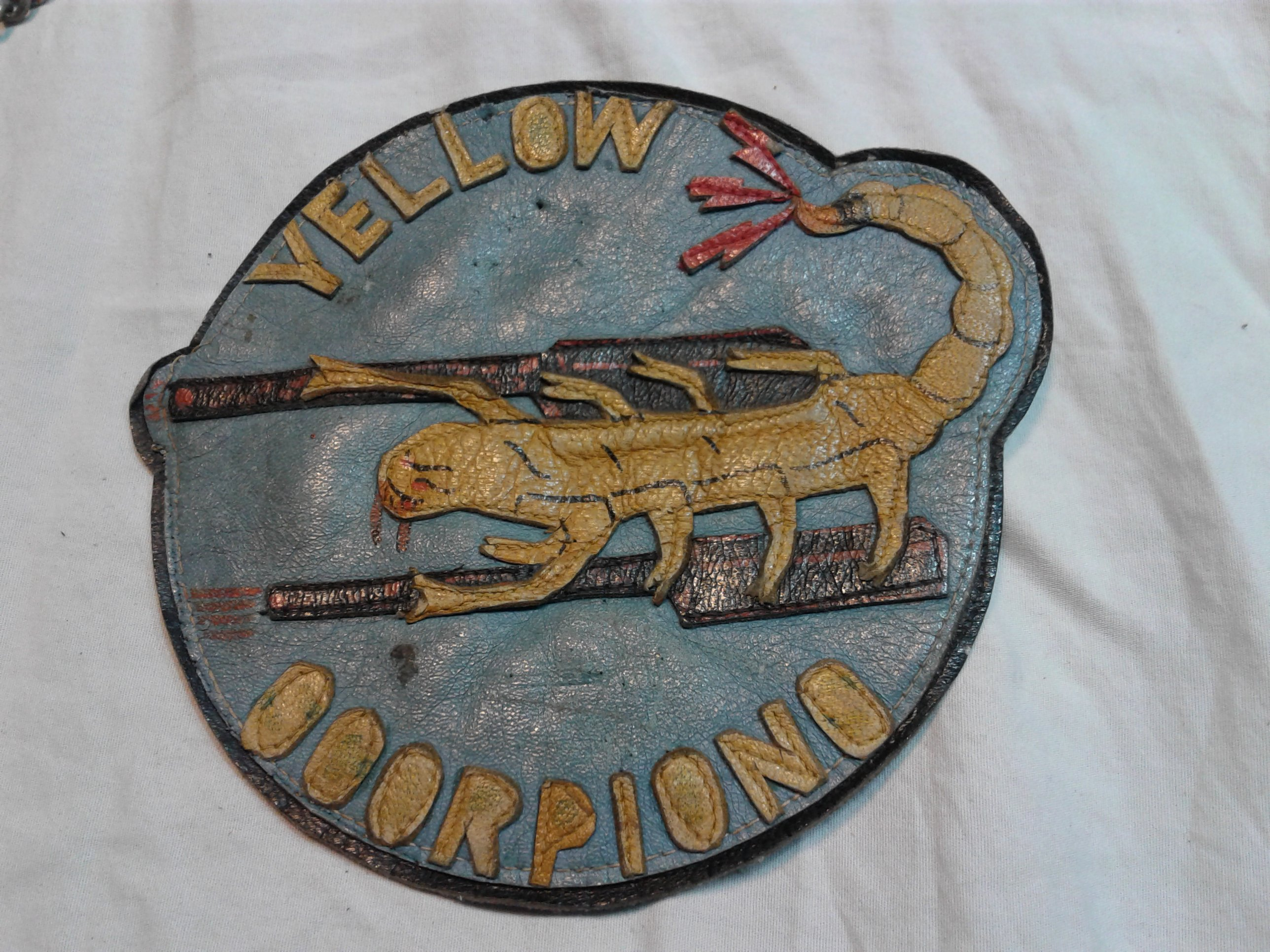
Mr. Starr's flight suit patch .. Flying Tigers, 10th and 14th Air Forces, 311th Fighter Group, China-Burma-India Theater.

After his military service he flew P-51s and F-86s in the California Air National Guard. He spent a year on active duty with Air Defense off the Southern California coast. During his duty with Air Defense Command. he was scrambled to investigate bogies in radar range off the California coast. From Starr's memoirs page: "On several occasions, me and my wing man had visual confirmation of what could only be described as a UFO, mostly cigar shaped objects with no visible means of propulsion and yet each time we gave chase at full throttle, they left us behind as if we were standing still. I had many experiences with UFO sightings during my time with the Air National Guard".

== Flying small planes ==
In 1950, Starr was the primary test pilot of the previous world's smallest airplane record holders: the Sky Baby and Stits SA-1A Junior. The partnership on the Sky Baby project ended, but he knew he could build a smaller more stable airplane.

So, in 1980 at the age of 60 he designed and built the Bumble Bee I which he flew on January 28, 1984.

He made modifications on his design and then built the Bumble Bee II the following year. He flew the Bumble Bee II on May 8, 1988, and broke his previous record, making the Bumble Bee II the smallest manned biplane, according to Guinness Book of Records. During one of the subsequent flights of the Bumble Bee II, the engine failed on downwind and the plane was destroyed in the resulting crash. Starr sustained serious injuries in the crash but subsequently recovered. The Bumble Bee I previous world record holder plane is on permanent display at the Pima Air & Space Museum in Tucson, Arizona.

In civilian life he had participated in most of the largest air shows in the United States and had also been a test pilot for experimental aircraft over the years.
