= Stits SA-11A Playmate =

Playmate
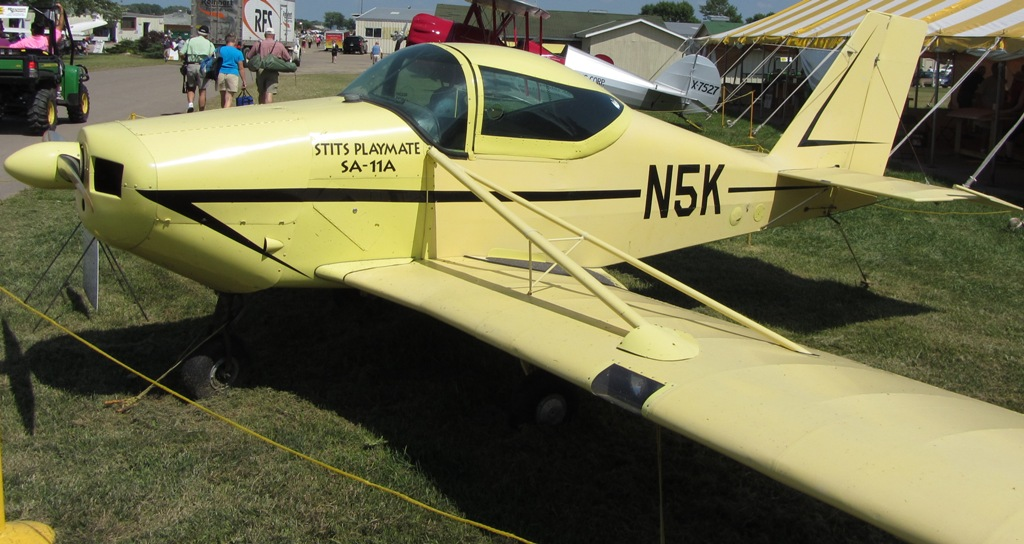
- Stits SA-11A

General information
- Type: Homebuilt aircraft
- National origin: United States
- Designer: Ray Stits

History
- First flight: 1963

The Stits SA-11A Playmate is a homebuilt aircraft design that features a rapid wing-folding mechanism for trailering or storage.

== Design ==
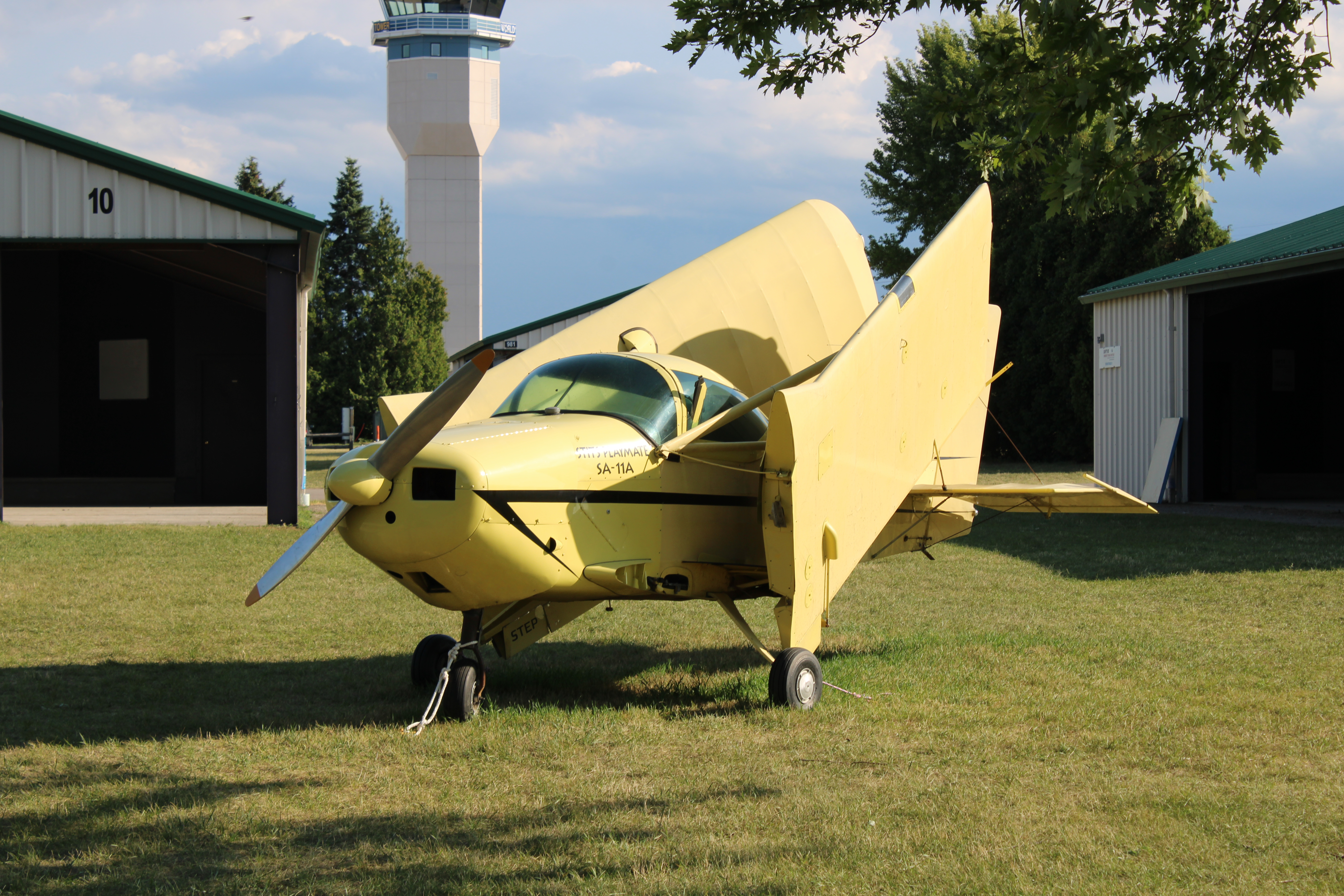
SA-11A with folded wings

The SA-11A is a single engine, side-by-side configuration seating, tricycle gear, strut-braced, low wing monoplane. The fuselage is welded steel tubing with aircraft fabric covering. The wings have a quick release mechanism that allows them to fold and lock alongside the fuselage in 15–30 seconds. Safety mechanisms were put in place so pilots could visually inspect that the wings were locked in place. A small sideways seat in the rear can accommodate 150 lb (68 kg) of luggage or a light passenger.

== Operational history ==
The prototype was donated by Ray Stits in 1969 to the EAA AirVenture Museum in Oshkosh, Wisconsin. Its engine went into the Stits SA-9A "Skycoupe" prototype for testing and development.

== Specifications (SA-11A Playmate) ==
Data from Sport Aviation

General characteristics

- Crew: 1
- Capacity: 1
- Length: 18 ft 4 in (5.59 m)
- Height: 6 ft 9 in (2.06 m)
- Wing area: 120 sq ft (11 m^{2})
- Empty weight: 886 lb (402 kg)
- Gross weight: 1,500 lb (680 kg)
- Fuel capacity: 24 U.S. gallons (91 L; 20 imp gal)
- Powerplant: 1 × Lycoming O-320 Horizontally opposed piston, 150 hp (110 kW)

Performance

- Maximum speed: 115 kn (132 mph, 212 km/h)
- Cruise speed: 100 kn (120 mph, 190 km/h)
- Range: 369 nmi (425 mi, 684 km)
- Service ceiling: 17,500 ft (5,300 m)
- Rate of climb: 1,625 ft/min (8.26 m/s)

== See also ==
Related development

- Stits Playboy

Aircraft of comparable role, configuration, and era

- Sonex Aircraft Onex a homebuilt aircraft with quick-folding wings
- Mustang Aeronautics Mustang II folding wing homebuilt
