= Starr Bumble Bee II =

Type of aircraft

Bumble Bee II
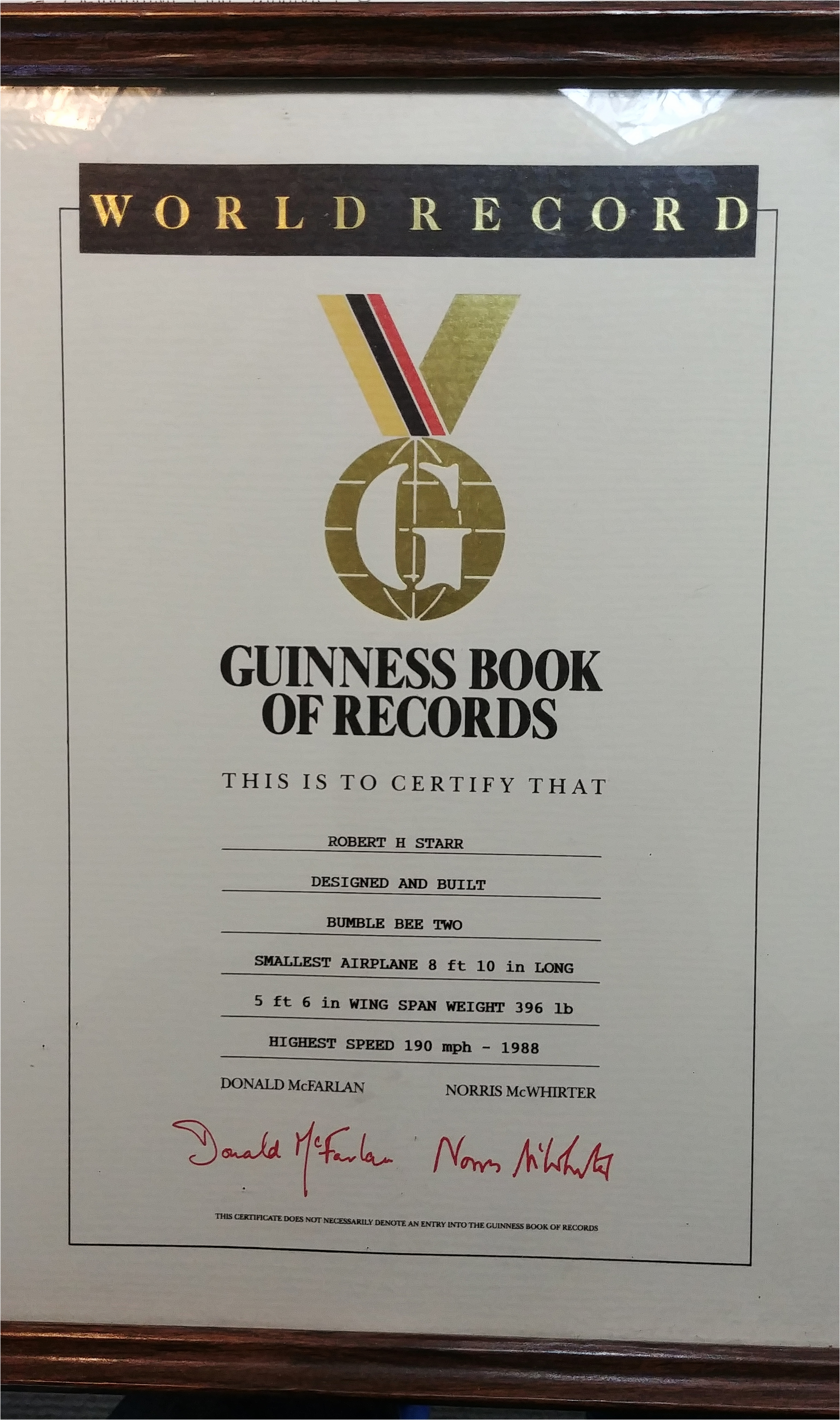
- Guinness certificate Starr Bumble Bee I on display at Pima Air & Space Museum, Tucson, Arizona

General information
- Type: Record Breaker
- Manufacturer: Homebuilt
- Designer: Robert H. Starr
- Status: On display
- Primary user: Robert H. Starr
- Number built: 1

History
- First flight: April 2, 1988
- Developed from: Starr Bumble Bee I

The Starr Bumble Bee II is an experimental aircraft designed and built specifically to acquire the title of "The World’s Smallest Airplane".

== Design and development ==
The Bumble Bee II was designed and built by Robert H. Starr in Phoenix, Arizona with the intent of breaking the record for the world's smallest biplane. Before building the Bumble Bee II, Starr had been deeply involved with the development of previous aircraft holding the title of "world's smallest airplane". His own plane, the Bumble Bee I, had lost the record to an aircraft called the Stits DS-1 Baby Bird, until the Bumble Bee II flew and regained the Guinness record.

The design of the Bumble Bee II was similar to Starr's original Bumble Bee I. Both aircraft were biplanes with negative staggered, cantilevered wings and conventional landing gear. However, the Bumble Bee II was smaller and lighter with a fuselage constructed of welded steel tubing covered by sheet metal, and wings covered in aircraft plywood. The power plant was a Continental C85 four-cylinder air-cooled horizontally opposed cylinder engine that produced 85 horsepower (63 kW). The upper wings had flaps while the lower wings had ailerons. All wing air-frame structures were equipped with tip plates to enhance the lift coefficient. The airplane had a small cockpit with the rudder pedals located under the engine compartment toward the front of the cowling.

== Operational history ==
External videos
- Flight test video on YouTube

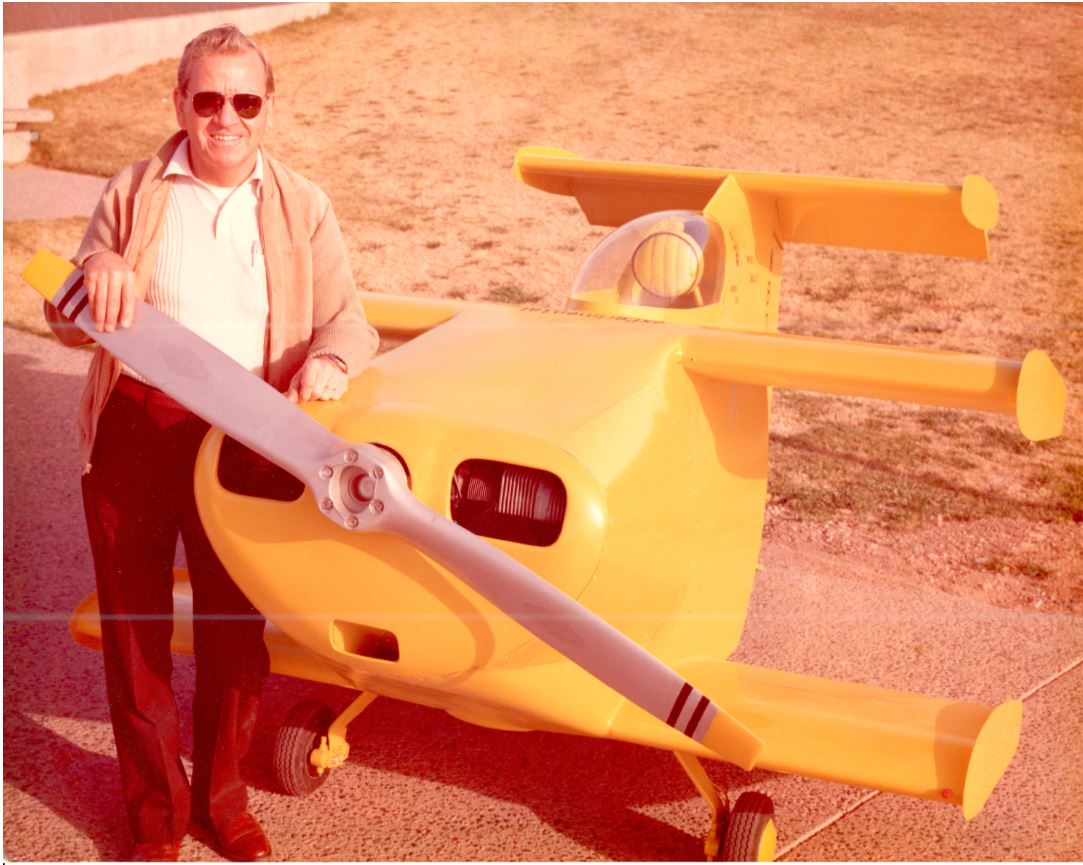
Bumble Bee II

The Bumble Bee II was flown on April 2, 1988, at Marana Airport just outside of Tucson, Arizona to achieve the world record for the smallest piloted airplane. According to the Guinness Book of World Records, the Bumble Bee II crashed and was destroyed during its 3rd flight on May 5, 1988. At 400 feet of altitude, the engine failed on a down-wind leg. The crash destroyed the Bumble Bee II and severely injured Robert Starr, who made a full recovery.

== Aircraft on public display ==
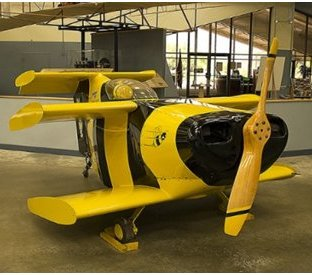
The Bumble Bee I on display at the Pima Air & Space Museum

The Bumble Bee I is on public display at the Pima Air & Space Museum.

== Naming ==
Starr named the aircraft in reference to an urban legend which states that according to standard aerodynamics, bumble bees do not have enough wing area to fly. Engineers and pilots had made a similar statement about Starr's Bumble Bee I and II, yet both flew.

== Specifications ==
Data from the Guinness Book of World Records and Disciples of Flight

General characteristics

- Crew: One
- Length: 8 ft 10 in (2.7 m)
- Wingspan: 5 ft 6 in (1.68 m)
- Height: 3 ft 11 in (1.2 m)
- Airfoil: 23012
- Empty weight: 396 lb (180 kg)
- Max takeoff weight: 574 lb (260 kg)
- Fuel capacity: 3 US gallons (11.35 litres)
- Powerplant: 1 × Continental C85 4-cylinder air-cooled horizontally opposed piston engine, 85 hp (63 kW)

Performance

- Maximum speed: 165 kn (190 mph, 305 km/h)
- Cruise speed: 130 kn (150 mph, 241 km/h)
- Stall speed: 75 kn (86 mph, 139 km/h)
- Service ceiling: 14,000 ft (4,270 m)
- Rate of climb: 4,500 ft/min (23 m/s)
