= VanGrunsven RV-1 =

American kit aircraft

RV-1
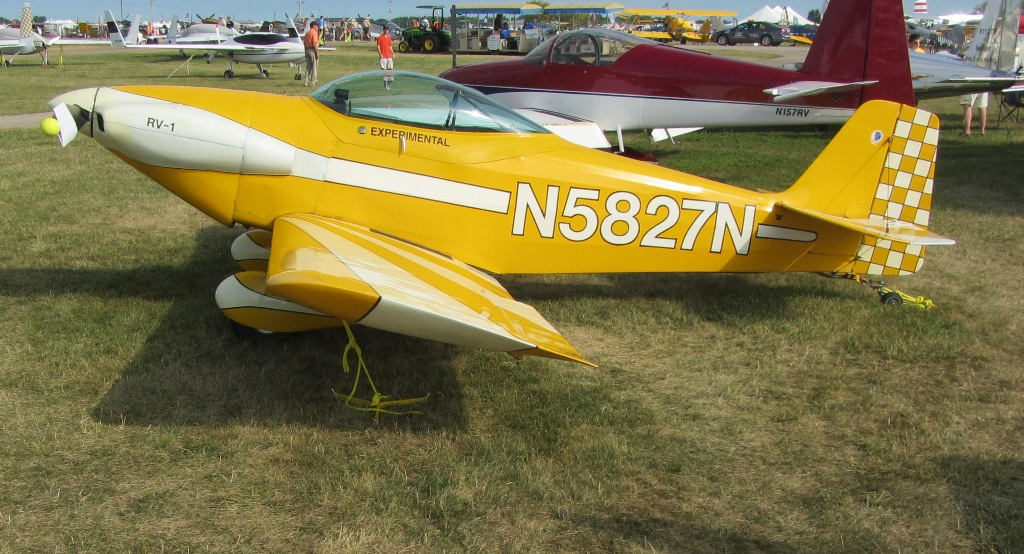

General information
- Type: Homebuilt aircraft
- National origin: United States
- Designer: Richard VanGrunsven

History
- Introduction date: October 1965
- Developed from: Stits Playboy

The RV-1 is a Stits Playboy that was constructed with modifications by Richard VanGrunsven. The aircraft was the first of a series of Van's aircraft that became the most popular homebuilt aircraft produced.

== Design and development ==
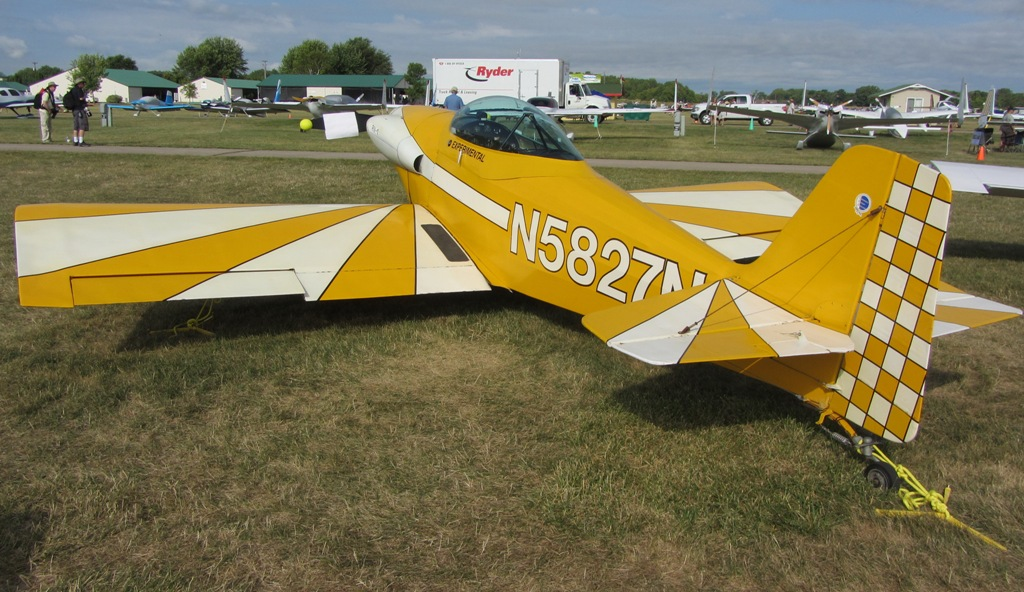
RV-1

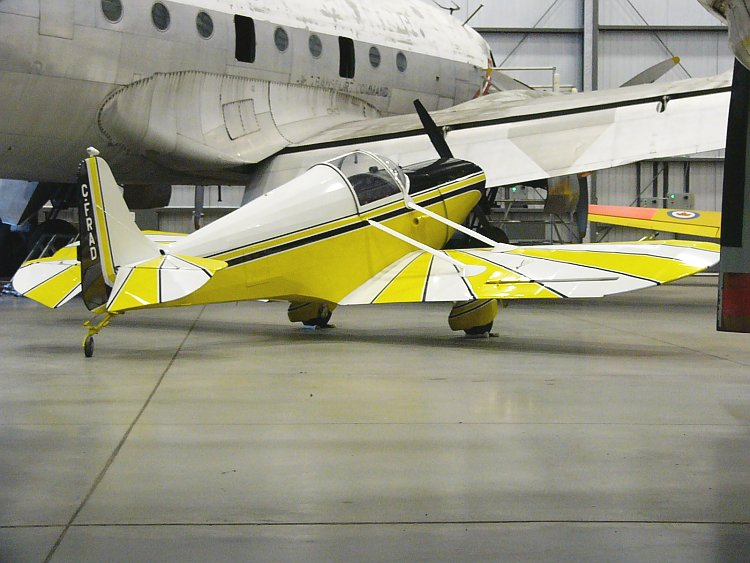
Picture of an SA-3A Playboy shows the original struts and canopy arrangement

The first RV-1 was a modified Stits SA-3A Playboy completed on 3 October 1965. The Playboy is a single-place, strut-braced, low-wing aircraft with conventional landing gear. The aircraft engine was upgraded from the normally fitted 65 hp (48 kW) powerplant to a 125 hp (93 kW) Lycoming O-290G. The resulting aircraft had good performance, but a high landing speed. On 16 August 1965, the aircraft was registered as an RV-1. Modifications included a new aluminum wing with flaps, Horner wing tips, and a bubble canopy. The fuselage uses welded steel tube construction in contrast to the RV series that followed which uses all-aluminum fuselage construction. The flaps reduced the stall speed to 50 mph (80 km/h). A second series of modifications included a streamlined cowling, wheel pants and modified horizontal tail surfaces.

== Operational history ==
The organization Friends of the RV-1 was formed to restore the prototype RV-1. It was flown across the United States and Canada in 2012 to various airshows and events. On 23 July 2012, the prototype RV-1 will be showcased at the EAA AirVenture Oshkosh, prior to donation to the EAA AirVenture Museum.

The Spirit of Flight Center air museum located in Erie, Colorado has an RV-1 which is airworthy. The Spirit of Flight RV-1 is displayed at the museum and at airshows and events.

== Variants ==
- Van's Aircraft RV-3 - The next design by VanGrunsven, based on the RV-1.

== Specifications (RV-1) ==
Data from Sport Aviation

General characteristics

- Crew: 1
- Length: 18 ft (5.5 m)
- Wingspan: 20 ft (6.1 m)
- Wing area: 90 sq ft (8.4 m^{2})
- Empty weight: 738 lb (335 kg)
- Gross weight: 1,065 lb (483 kg)
- Powerplant: 1 × Lycoming O-290G Horizontally opposed piston, 125 hp (93 kW)
- Propellers: 2-bladed

Performance

- Stall speed: 43 kn (50 mph, 80 km/h)
