= Stits SA-5 Flut-R-Bug =

SA-5 Flut-R-Bug
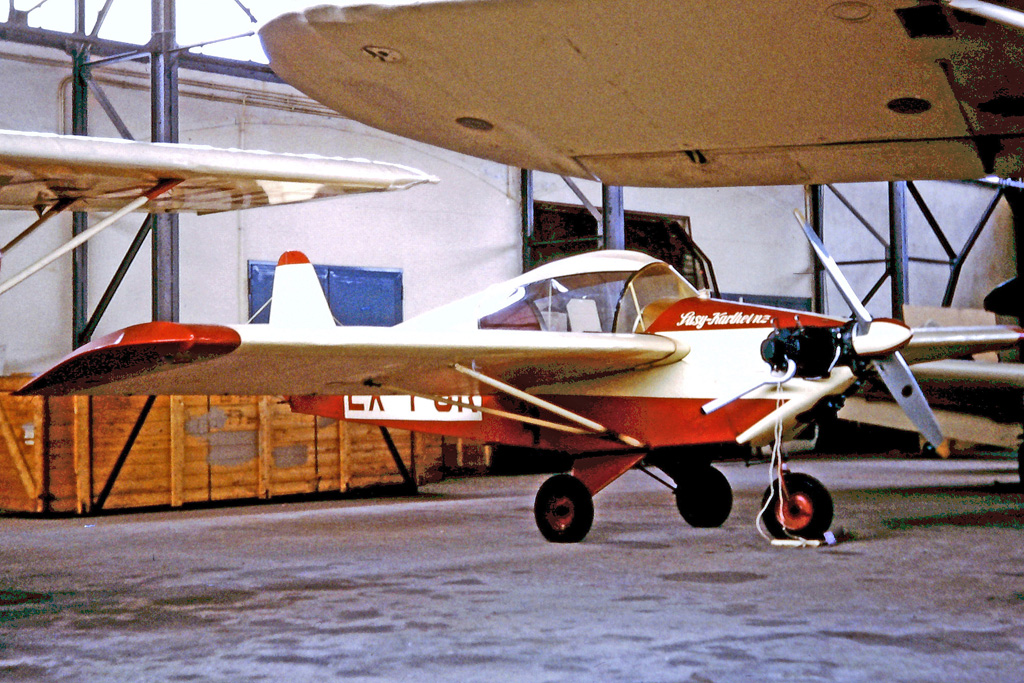
- SA-6B Flut-R-Bug at Luxembourg Airport in 1965

General information
- Type: Homebuilt aircraft
- National origin: United States
- Manufacturer: Stits Aircraft Company
- Designer: Ray Stits
- Number built: 27 full kits sold, 1200 set of plans sold

History
- First flight: 1956

The Stits SA-5 Flut-R-Bug is a homebuilt aircraft designed by Ray Stits.

== Design and development ==
The Flut-R-Bug can be built as a single place or tandem seat aircraft. It was an early complete-kit aircraft, sold with a pre-welded fuselage. Stits planned to deliver 100 kits to the German market for homebuilding. Examples have been completed in the United States, Canada, and in Europe.

The SA-5 is a mid-wing, tricycle landing gear design with folding wings. The aircraft was intended to be towed by a vehicle by the (lowered) tail on its main gear with wings folded along its sides. The cockpit can be open, or covered with a bubble canopy. The fuselage is constructed from welded steel tubing with aircraft fabric covering. The wings use spruce wooden spars with fabric covering.

== Variants ==
SA-5A
Single place variant
SA-6A
Two seat tandem variant with a 1,015 lb (460 kg) gross weight
SA-6B
Two seat variant with wider span wings and larger tail surface

== Specifications (Stits SA-5 Flut-R-Bug) ==
Data from Sport Aviation

General characteristics

- Crew: 1
- Capacity: 1 passenger
- Length: 17 ft (5.2 m)
- Wingspan: 23 ft (7.0 m)
- Wing area: 103.5 sq ft (9.62 m^{2})
- Airfoil: NACA 4412
- Empty weight: 528 lb (239 kg)
- Fuel capacity: 9 U.S. gallons (34 L; 7.5 imp gal)
- Powerplant: 1 × Continental A65 horizontally opposed piston, 65 hp (48 kW)
- Propellers: 2-bladed Sensenich, 6 ft 0 in (1.83 m) diameter

Performance

- Maximum speed: 87 kn (100 mph, 160 km/h)
- Cruise speed: 70 kn (80 mph, 130 km/h)
- Stall speed: 35 kn (40 mph, 64 km/h)
- Range: 170 nmi (200 mi, 320 km)
- Service ceiling: 12,000 ft (3,700 m)
- Rate of climb: 1,000 ft/min (5.1 m/s)
- Wing loading: 6.4 lb/sq ft (31 kg/m^{2})
