= Stits SA-1A Junior =

The Stits SA-1A Junior is a world's smallest monoplane designed by Ray Stits and piloted by Robert H. Starr.

== History ==
The incentive to build "Junior," the monoplane, came from a discussion about the world's smallest airplane. Someone mentioned Steve Wittman's little racer with a 13' span, and Ray asked if he could fly something with a 10'10" wingspan. One of the participants in the conversation said it wouldn't be possible, and that was all it took. Ray began building it. He had actually been thinking about it for a long time and proceeded with a 40 hp engine from an Aeronca. At that point, He switched to a 65 hp Continental. The airplane was a handful, and after the third crash on the fifth test flight, Ray shortened the wings to 8'10" and attached wing end plates to generate more lift and improve aileron control. He found a new pilot, Bob Starr, a former P-51 pilot. In 1950, Junior was a huge success at air shows.

It is currently unknown what happened to the Junior but it might have been destroyed or scrapped

== Specifications ==
Length: 3.05 metres

Wingspan: 2.46 metres
