= Stits Playboy =

Type of aircraft

Stits SA-3A Playboy
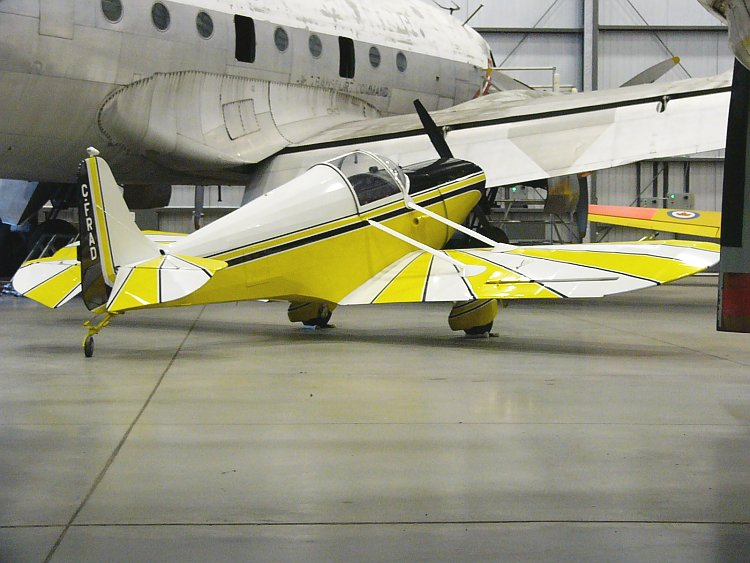
- Canada's first amateur-built aircraft Stitts SA-3A Playboy C-FRAD at the Canada Aviation and Space Museum

General information
- Type: Amateur-built aircraft
- National origin: United States
- Designer: Ray Stits

History
- Introduction date: 1952
- First flight: 1952
- Variants: VanGrunsven RV-1; Van's Aircraft RV-3

The Stits SA-3A Playboy (sometimes called the Stitts SA-3A Playboy) is a single seat, strut-braced low-wing monoplane that was designed by Ray Stits for amateur construction. The aircraft was designed and the prototype was completed in a three-month period during 1952. The design went on to become one of the most influential in the post-war boom in aircraft homebuilding.

A side-by-side two seat version is known as the SA-3B.

== Design and development ==
The Playboy was the third of fifteen different aircraft designs created by Stits, who migrated in the 1960s from selling plans to developing the Polyfiber line of aircraft coverings and related paint formulas.

The Playboy was designed to be constructed from either plans or from a series of partial kits. The construction is mixed with the fuselage made from welded steel and the wings built from wood. The aircraft is fabric-covered and incorporates a sliding canopy. The aircraft is unusual in that the low wings are strut-braced.

The engine range is from 85 to 160 hp (63 to 119 kW) with the 85 hp (63 kW) Continental C85 the most commonly used.

The first in the series of Van's Aircraft designed by Richard VanGrunsven, the Van's Aircraft RV-1 was a modified Playboy and directly led to the Van's Aircraft RV-3 and the highly successful RV line of aircraft.

== Operational history ==
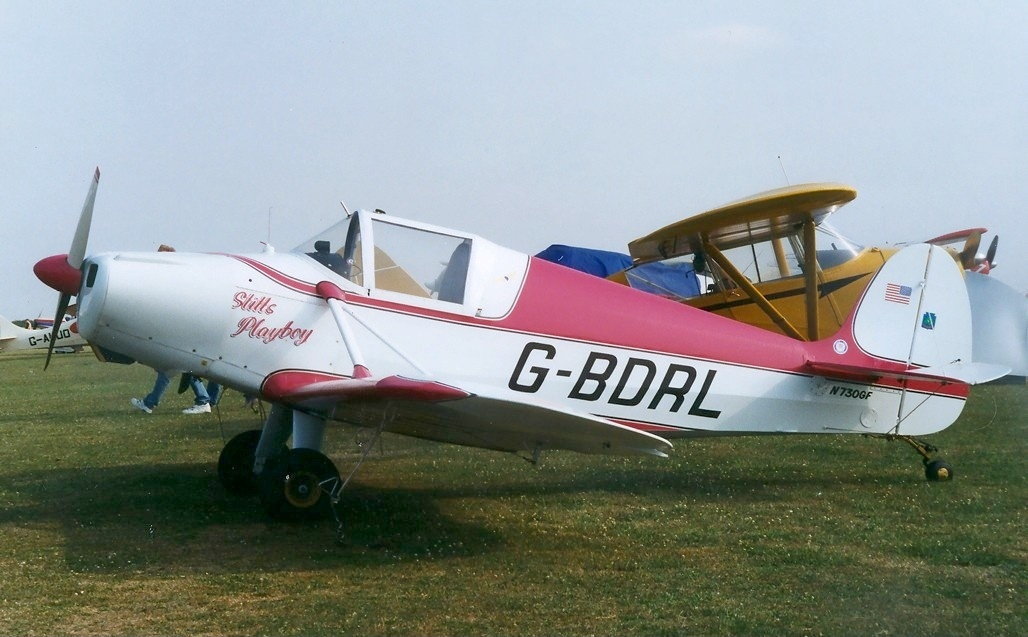
British registered Stitts SA-3A Playboy

Having been sold in 1955, the prototype Playboy passed through several owners' hands before being donated to the Experimental Aircraft Association. Ray Stits was the first member of Chapter 1. That plane is now in the EAA Airventure Museum in Oshkosh, Wisconsin.

Canada's first licensed amateur-built aircraft was a highly modified Playboy that was built by Keith S. Hopkinson. Hopkinson used the basic Playboy design and incorporated a Piper J-3 cowling, a Cessna 170 propeller spinner, de Havilland Tiger Moth wing struts, Cessna 140 conventional landing gear and Stinson 108 wheel pants.

In March 2010 there were still 41 Playboys registered in the US, six in Canada and two in the UK.

== Variants ==
SA-3A
Single seat version, powered by an 85 hp (63 kW) Continental C85
SA-3B
Two seats in side-by-side configuration version, powered by a 115 hp (86 kW) Lycoming O-235
Super Playboy
A one-off design with two foot wing extensions powered by a 150 hp (112 kW) Franklin
VanGrunsven RV-1
A 125 hp (93 kW) Lycoming O-290G powered, cantilever aluminium winged modification of an SA-3A.

== Aircraft on display ==
- Canada Aviation Museum - first Canadian homebuilt aircraft, modified Playboy C-FRAD
- EAA AirVenture Museum - prototype Playboy N8KK

== Specifications (SA-3A) ==
Data from Plane & Pilot, Canada Aviation Museum & AirVenture Museum

General characteristics

- Crew: one
- Length: 17 ft 4 in (5.28 m)
- Wingspan: 22 ft 2 in (6.76 m)
- Height: 6 ft 4 in (1.93 m)
- Wing area: 96 sq ft (8.9 m^{2})
- Empty weight: 600 lb (272 kg)
- Gross weight: 902 lb (409 kg)
- Fuel capacity: 14 US gallons (53 litres)
- Powerplant: 1 × Continental C85 four cylinder, four-stroke piston engine, 85 hp (63 kW)

Performance

- Maximum speed: 145 mph (233 km/h, 126 kn)
- Cruise speed: 130 mph (210 km/h, 110 kn)
- Range: 400 mi (640 km, 350 nmi)
- Service ceiling: 12,000 ft (3,700 m)
- Rate of climb: 1,050 ft/min (5.3 m/s)

== See also ==
Related development

- Stits SA-7 Sky-Coupe
- Stits SA-11A Playmate
