= Stits SA-8 Skeeto =

Stits SA-8A Skeeto

General information
- Type: Homebuilt aircraft
- National origin: United States of America
- Designer: Ray Stits

History
- Introduction date: 1957

The Stits SA-8A Skeeto is an early homebuilt ultralight design by Ray Stits. ("Ultralight" was not official classification in America at the time since Code of Federal Regulations Title 14 (Federal Aviation Regulations) Part 103, better known as 14 CFR Part 103 or just Part 103, which defined ultralight vehicles in the United States, was not adopted until 1982.)

== Development ==
The Skeeto was initially intended to be an affordable light aircraft that could be built complete for under $500 in 1957. The fuselage was welded steel tubing, with mostly fabric covered wood construction for the wings and control surfaces. The engine for this kit venture was to be a low cost off-the shelf model.

- Test model 1 was a 4 hp (3 kW) Continental modified for 6 hp (4 kW).
- Test model 2 was a two cycle 3.5 hp (2.6 kW) engine with a belt reduction.
- Test model 3 used two engines on a single v-belt making it a 4 hp (3 kW) twin engine which flew at 25 mph.
- Test model 4 had a homelite chainsaw engine at 7.5 hp (5.6 kW)
- Test model 5 used a Disston chain saw engine at 9 hp (7 kW)
- Test model 6 used a Disston chain saw engine mounted inverted.
- Test model 7 used an Inverted Evinrude 25 hp (19 kW) outboard boat motor.
- Test model 8 used a right-side up Evinrude.

== Operational history ==
Test flights were limited to the length of the runway after the aircraft was registered as a "research and development" project. The roll rate was so low at 20-30 mph, that rudder turns were preferred. The 3-4 pound wing loading was considered impractically light for handling. An example of a SA-8 Skeeto was donated to the Claremont, California Air Museum in 1958, it is now in the EAA AirVenture Museum in Oshkosh, Wisconsin.

== Specifications (Stits SA-8A Skeeto) ==
Data from Sport Aviation

General characteristics

- Length: 18 ft (5.5 m)
- Wingspan: 30 ft (9.1 m)
- Height: 7 ft (2.1 m)
- Wing area: 120 sq ft (11 m^{2}) model 1
- Empty weight: 175 lb (79 kg) 175lb test one model.
- Gross weight: 400 lb (181 kg) model 1
- Fuel capacity: 2.5 gal (9.5 litres)
- Powerplant: × Evinrude , 25 hp (19 kW)

Performance

- Maximum speed: 48 kn (55 mph, 89 km/h)
- Cruise speed: 39 kn (45 mph, 72 km/h)
- Service ceiling: 50 ft (15 m) This aircraft was only certified to fly up to 50 feet.
- Rate of climb: 250 ft/min (1.3 m/s)
