= List of aircraft (Sg) =

This is a list of aircraft in alphabetical order beginning with 'Sg'.

== Sg ==
=== SG Aviation ===
(SG Aviation srl (now called Storm Aircraft), Sabaudia, Italy)

- SG Aviation Rallye
- SG Aviation Storm 280
- SG Aviation Storm 300
- SG Aviation Storm 320E
- SG Aviation Sea Storm

=== SGCIM ===
(Société Générale des Constructions Industrielles et Mécaniques) see also: Borel

- SGCIM CAN.2
- SGCIM CAP.2
- SGCIM 1924 flying boat
- SGCIM 1924 tri-motor
- SGCIM C.1
- SGCIM C.2
