= Storm Century =

- Storm Century

General information
- Type: Light Sport Aircraft
- National origin: Italy
- Manufacturer: Storm Aircraft Company
- Designer: Giovanni Salsedo

History
- Introduction date: 1991
- First flight: 1991
- Developed from: Storm 300
- Variant: Storm RG

The Century are a family of aircraft produced by the Storm Aircraft Company, of Sabaudia, Italy.

== Design and development ==
The Storm Century range of aircraft grew from the original "Storm" range developed and marketed by SG Aviation. The Storm were mainly sold as kits and flew in the ultralight or experimental categories, depending on the jurisdiction. The whole Storm range of aircraft are now manufactured and sold by Stormaircraft srl. The Storm Century is marketed in the United States and Australia as a Light Sport Aircraft, and in numerous other countries worldwide as an Ultralight (e.g. in Germany, Denmark and Australia). The aircraft is a low-wing, all metal design using a 100 hp (70 kW) Rotax 912UL-S engine. Other engines are available to order.

The Century was initially fitted with an "all flying" combination horizontal stabiliser and elevator. Subsequently, as part of the development of the Century RG – a retractable gear variant – the vertical stabiliser and empennage was subtly redesigned and the horizontal tail surfaces were replaced by a conventional fixed horizontal stabiliser/elevator combination. From this modification a fixed gear alternative was developed and identified as the Century '04.

A further development of the Century involved adding 25 cm to the length of the aircraft forward of the firewall (by way of a modified engine mount) and 15 cm to the aircraft immediately aft of the original cockpit. This 2+2 variant is identified as the Century 5XL and is manufactured with either the original or the Century '04 tail configuration. In addition the 5XL wingspan was increased by some 40 cm over the original. This variant is available as a 2-seat LSA or a 2+2 in the experimental category. The 5XL has an enhanced top speed of up to 130 knots TAS and a reduced stall speed together with extremely responsive handling. It appears that the modifications have contributed positively to the original aircraft.

== Specifications (Storm Century) ==
Data from

General characteristics

- Crew: 1
- Capacity: 1 pax
- Length: 6.81 m (22 ft 4 in)
- Wingspan: 8.05 m (26 ft 5 in)
- Height: 2.1 m (7 ft)
- Wing area: 9.98 m^{2} (107.4 sq ft)
- Empty weight: 293 kg (645 lb)
- Gross weight: 449 kg (990 lb)
- Max takeoff weight: 599 kg (1,320 lb)
- Fuel capacity: 26.4 US gal (100 L; 22.0 imp gal)
- Powerplant: 1 × Rotax 912ULS 4-cyl. air-cooled horizontally-opposed piston engine, 75 kW (100 hp) at 5,800 rpm

Performance

- Maximum speed: 286 km/h (178 mph, 155 kn)
- Cruise speed: 204 km/h (127 mph, 110 kn) 75% power at 2,000 ft (609.60 m), ISA conditions
- Stall speed: 77 km/h (48 mph, 42 kn) flaps up, 42 mph (68 km/h; 36 kn) flaps down
- Never exceed speed: 311 km/h (193 mph, 168 kn)
- Range: 1,500 km (920 mi, 800 nmi)
- Service ceiling: 3,700 m (12,000 ft)
- Rate of climb: 4.3 m/s (850 ft/min)
- Take off run: 430 ft (131.06 m)
- Landing distance: 640 ft (195.07 m)
