= Sabaudia Town Hall =

- Palazzo Comunale di Sabaudia (Italian)
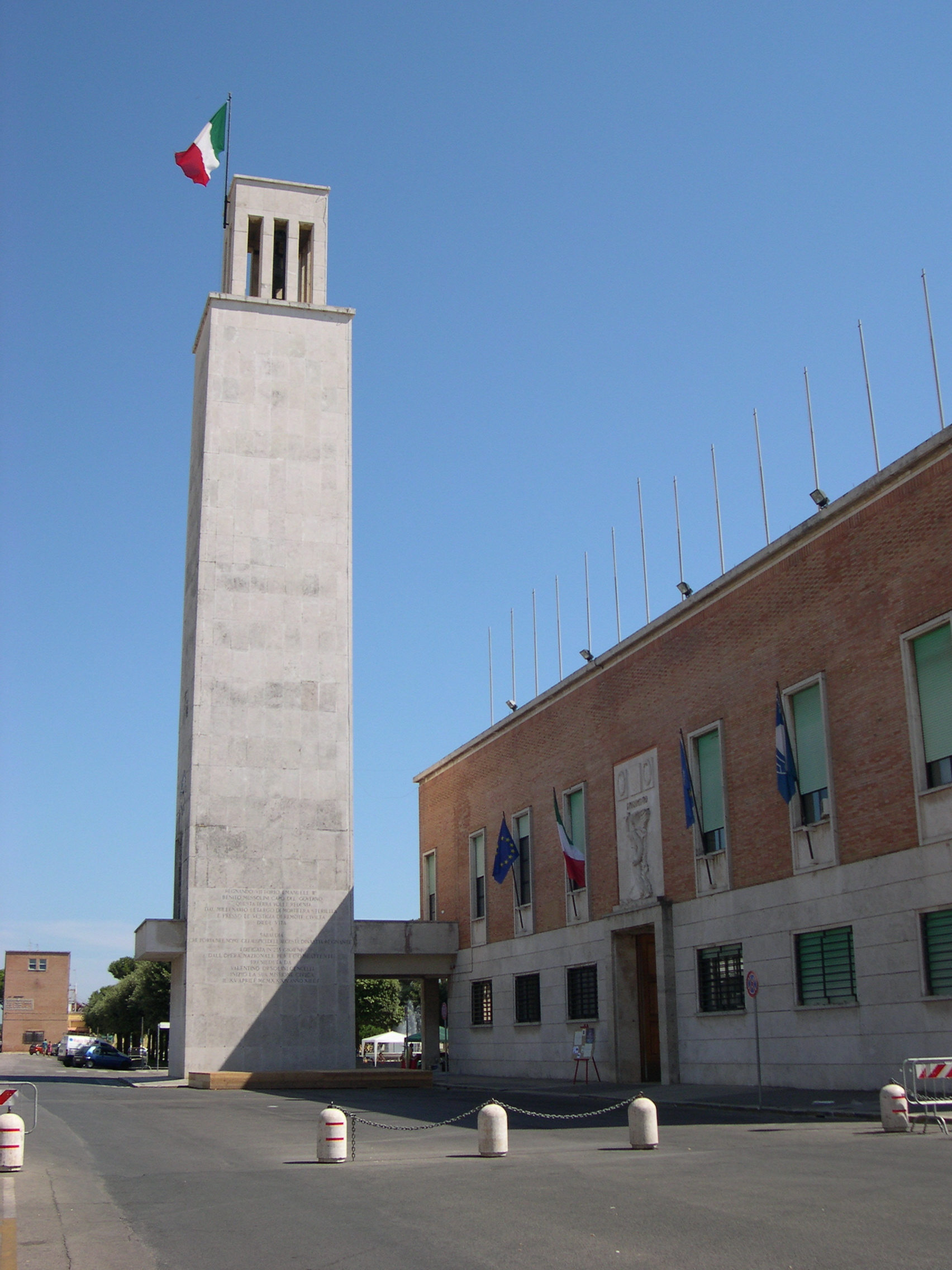
- Sabaudia Town Hall in 2006
- Click on the map for a fullscreen view

General information
- Architectural style: Italian Rationalism
- Location: Sabaudia, Italy
- Coordinates: 41°17′59.94″N 13°01′29.29″E

The Sabaudia Town Hall (Italian: Palazzo Comunale di Sabaudia) is the town hall of the town and comune of Sabaudia in Italy.

== Description ==
The building, an example of Italian Rationalism, is located in the city center of Sabaudia. The brick facade is cladded in travertine on the ground floor. Above the main entrance, there is a bas-relief depicting a Walking Victory, a work by the sculptors F. Nagni and A. Vecchi.

Next to the building stands the Civic Tower, connected to the building by a balcony. It is 46 meters tall and entirely covered in travertine.

== Gallery ==
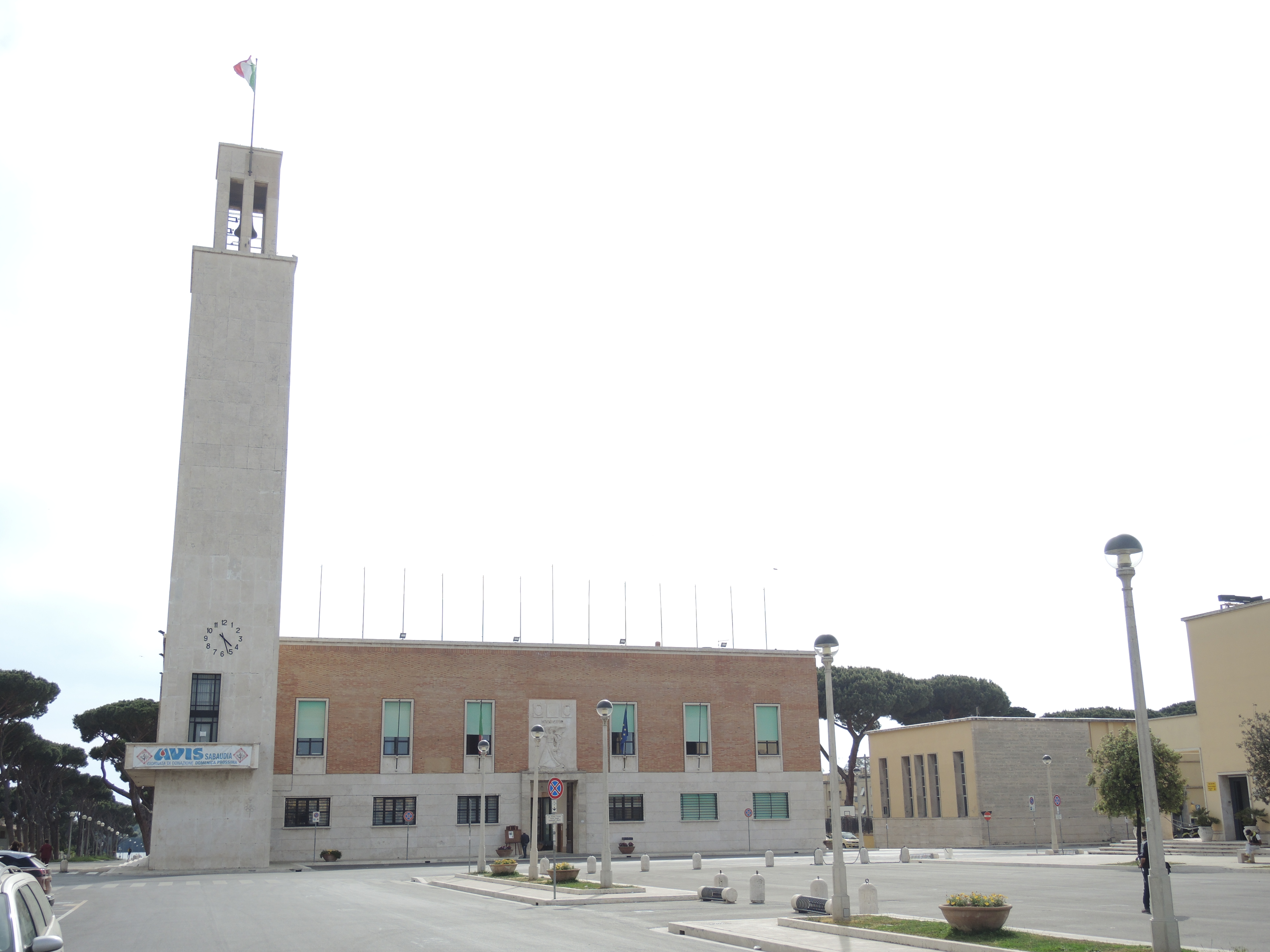

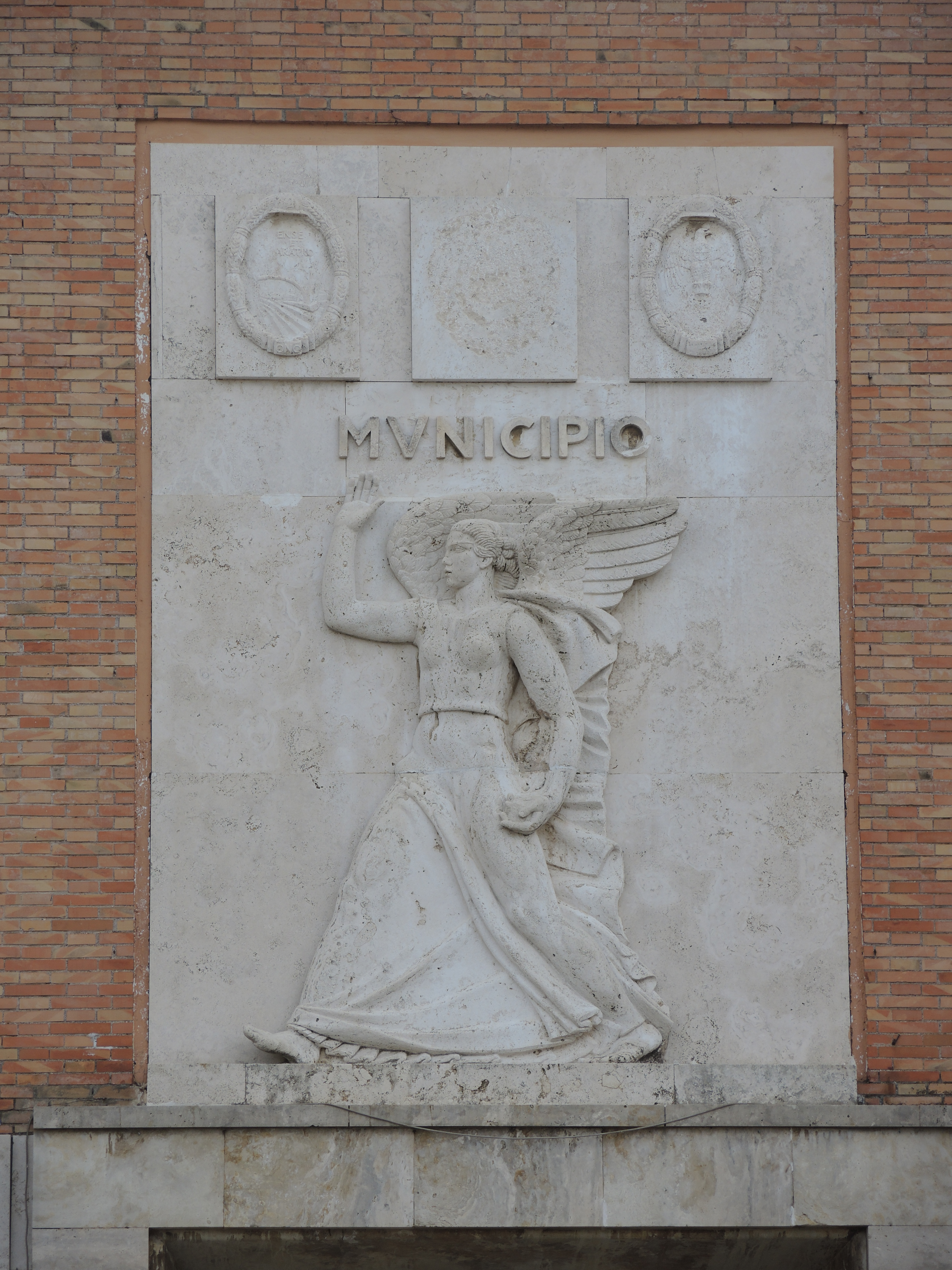

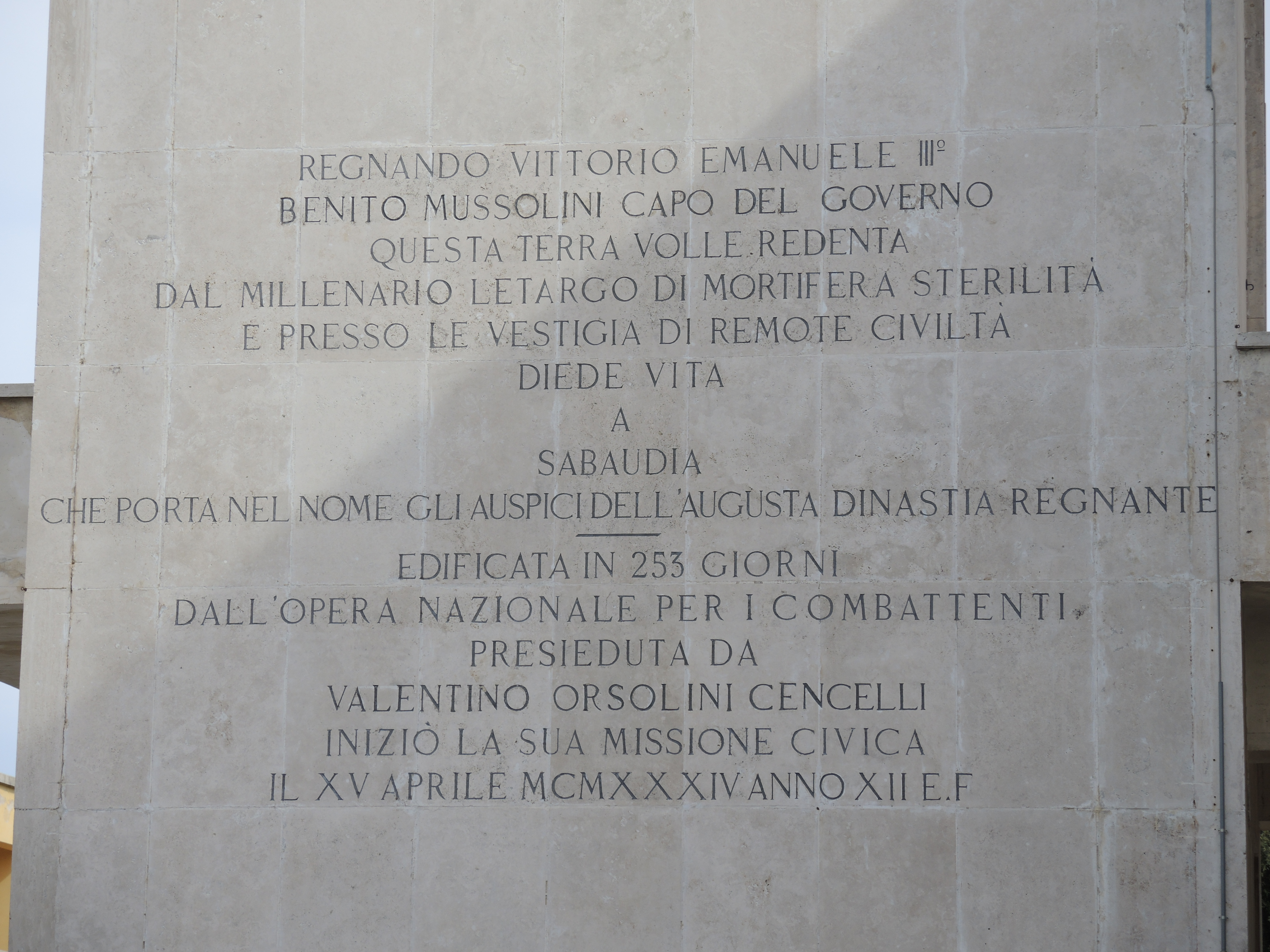
