= Storm 300 =

Italian homebuilt aircraft

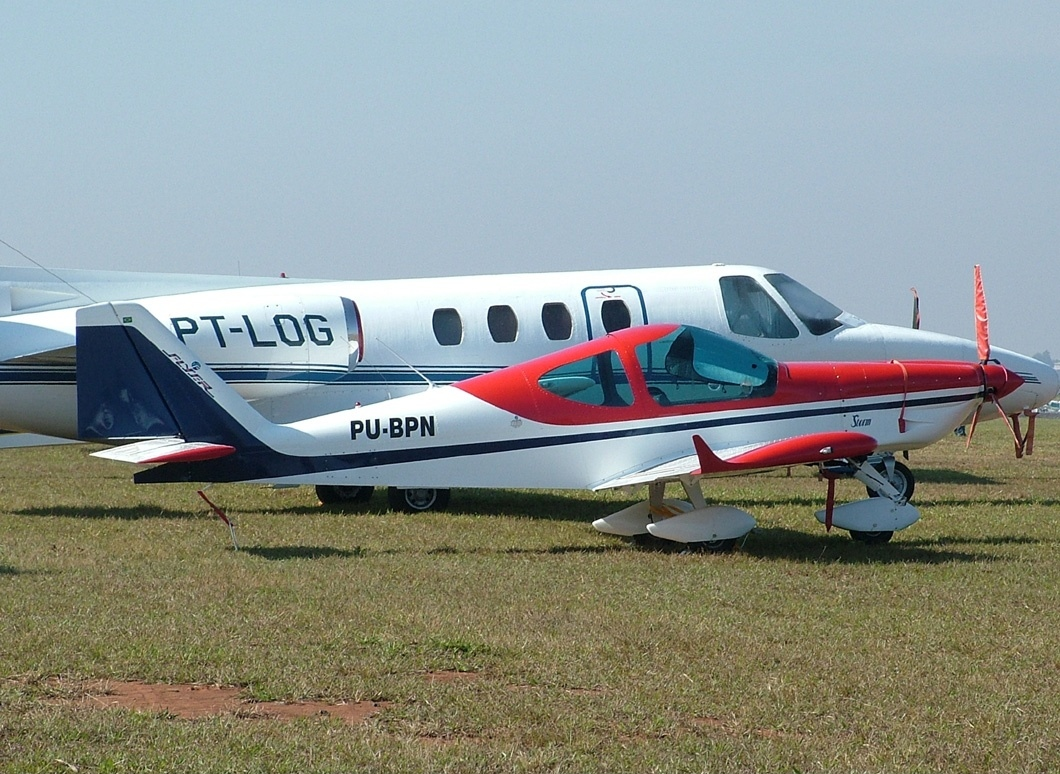
- Storm 300B tricycle gear

General information
- Type: Homebuilt aircraft
- National origin: Italy
- Manufacturer: Storm Aircraft
- Status: Production completed
- Number built: 12 (1998)

History
- Variants: Storm Century; Storm RG

The Storm 300 is an Italian homebuilt aircraft that was designed and produced by Storm Aircraft of Sabaudia. Storm Aircraft was originally called SG Aviation srl. When it was available the aircraft was supplied as a kit for amateur construction.

== Design and development ==
The original model Storm 300 features a cantilever low-wing, a two-seats-in-side-by-side configuration enclosed cockpit under a bubble canopy, fixed conventional landing gear or optionally tricycle landing gear, both with wheel pants, and a single engine in tractor configuration.

The aircraft is made from aluminum sheet with some fibreglass parts. Its 7.92 m (26.0 ft) span wing employs a GA 3OU-6135 Mod airfoil, mounts flaps and has a wing area of 11.055 m^{2} (119.00 sq ft). The cabin width is 112 cm (44 in). The acceptable power range is 100 to 125 hp (75 to 93 kW) and the standard engines used are the 100 hp (75 kW) Rotax 912ULS and the 115 hp (86 kW) Rotax 914 turbocharged powerplant.

The Storm 300 has a typical empty weight of 322 kg (710 lb) and a gross weight of 524 kg (1,155 lb), giving a useful load of 202 kg (445 lb). With full fuel of 144 litres (32 imp gal; 38 US gal) the payload for pilot, passenger and baggage is 99 kg (218 lb).

The standard day, sea level, no wind, take off with a 115 hp (86 kW) engine is 137 m (449 ft) and the landing roll is 110 m (361 ft).

The manufacturer estimated the construction time from the supplied kit as 500 hours or 350 hours from the quick-build kit.

The Storm 300 was later developed into the Storm Century and then the retractable gear Storm RG.

== Operational history ==
By 1998 the company reported that 20 kits had been sold and 12 aircraft were completed and flying.

In February 2014 one example was registered in the United States with the Federal Aviation Administration and one with Transport Canada.

== Specifications (Storm 300) ==
Data from AeroCrafter and The Incomplete Guide to Airfoil Usage

General characteristics

- Crew: one
- Capacity: one passenger
- Length: 6.55 m (21 ft 6 in)
- Wingspan: 7.92 m (26 ft 0 in)
- Wing area: 11.06 m^{2} (119.0 sq ft)
- Airfoil: GA 3OU-6135 Mod
- Empty weight: 322 kg (710 lb)
- Gross weight: 524 kg (1,155 lb)
- Fuel capacity: 144 litres (32 imp gal; 38 US gal)
- Powerplant: 1 × Rotax 914 four cylinder, air and liquid-cooled, four stroke turbocharged aircraft engine, 86 kW (115 hp)
- Propellers: 3-bladed ground adjustable composite

Performance

- Maximum speed: 320 km/h (200 mph, 170 kn)
- Cruise speed: 275 km/h (171 mph, 149 kn)
- Stall speed: 56 km/h (35 mph, 30 kn) flaps down
- Range: 2,660 km (1,650 mi, 1,430 nmi)
- Service ceiling: 3,700 m (12,000 ft)
- Rate of climb: 7.6 m/s (1,500 ft/min)
- Wing loading: 47.4 kg/m^{2} (9.70 lb/sq ft)
