= Storm Aviation Sea Storm =

Italian homebuilt aircraft

Sea Storm
- Storm 300B tricycle gear

General information
- Type: Homebuilt aircraft
- National origin: Italy
- Manufacturer: Storm Aircraft
- Status: Production completed
- Number built: 12 (1998)

The Sea Storm is an Italian homebuilt amphibious flying boat that was designed and produced by Storm Aircraft of Sabaudia. Storm Aircraft was originally called SG Aviation srl. When it was available the aircraft was supplied as a kit for amateur construction.

== Design and development ==
The Sea Storm features a cantilever shoulder-wing, a two-seats-in-side-by-side configuration, with four seats optional, an enclosed cockpit under a hinged canopy, retractable conventional landing gear and a single engine in pusher configuration. There are two small airfoil sponsons for water balance mounted low on the fuselage. The aircraft has a highly swept fin and rudder.

The aircraft wings are made from aluminum sheet with some fibreglass parts, while the hull is composite. Its 9.24 m (30.3 ft) span wing mounts large flaps and has a wing area of 12.25 m^{2} (131.9 sq ft). The cabin width is 125 cm (49 in). The acceptable power range is 100 to 260 hp (75 to 194 kW) and the standard engine used is the 115 hp (86 kW) Lycoming O-235 powerplant.

The Sea Storm has a typical empty weight of 309 kg (681 lb) and a gross weight of 609 kg (1,343 lb), giving a useful load of 300 kg (660 lb). With full fuel of 100 litres (22 imp gal; 26 US gal) the payload for pilot, passenger and baggage is 229 kg (505 lb).

The standard day, sea level, no wind, take off on land with a 115 hp (86 kW) engine is 122 m (400 ft) and the landing roll is 145 m (476 ft). On the water the take-off run is 250 m (820 ft) and the landing run is 189 m (620 ft) for the two place version.

The manufacturer estimated the construction time from the supplied kit as 700 hours or 550 hours from the quick-build kit.

== Operational history ==
By 1998 the company reported that 25 kits had been sold and 12 aircraft were completed and flying.

In February 2014 one example was registered in the United States with the Federal Aviation Administration, although two had been registered at one time.

== Specifications (Sea Storm) ==
Data from AeroCrafter

General characteristics

- Crew: one
- Capacity: one passenger
- Length: 7.47 m (24 ft 6 in)
- Wingspan: 9.25 m (30 ft 4 in)
- Wing area: 12.24 m^{2} (131.8 sq ft)
- Empty weight: 309 kg (682 lb)
- Gross weight: 608 kg (1,340 lb)
- Fuel capacity: 100 litres (22 imp gal; 26 US gal)
- Powerplant: 1 × Lycoming O-235 four cylinder, air-cooled, four stroke aircraft engine, 86 kW (115 hp)
- Propellers: 2-bladed ground adjustable composite

Performance

- Maximum speed: 325 km/h (202 mph, 176 kn)
- Cruise speed: 238 km/h (148 mph, 129 kn)
- Stall speed: 61 km/h (38 mph, 33 kn) flaps down
- Range: 1,670 km (1,040 mi, 900 nmi)
- Service ceiling: 4,500 m (14,700 ft)
- Rate of climb: 6.6 m/s (1,300 ft/min)
- Wing loading: 50 kg/m^{2} (10.2 lb/sq ft)
