= Storm RG Fury =

Italian ultralight aircraft

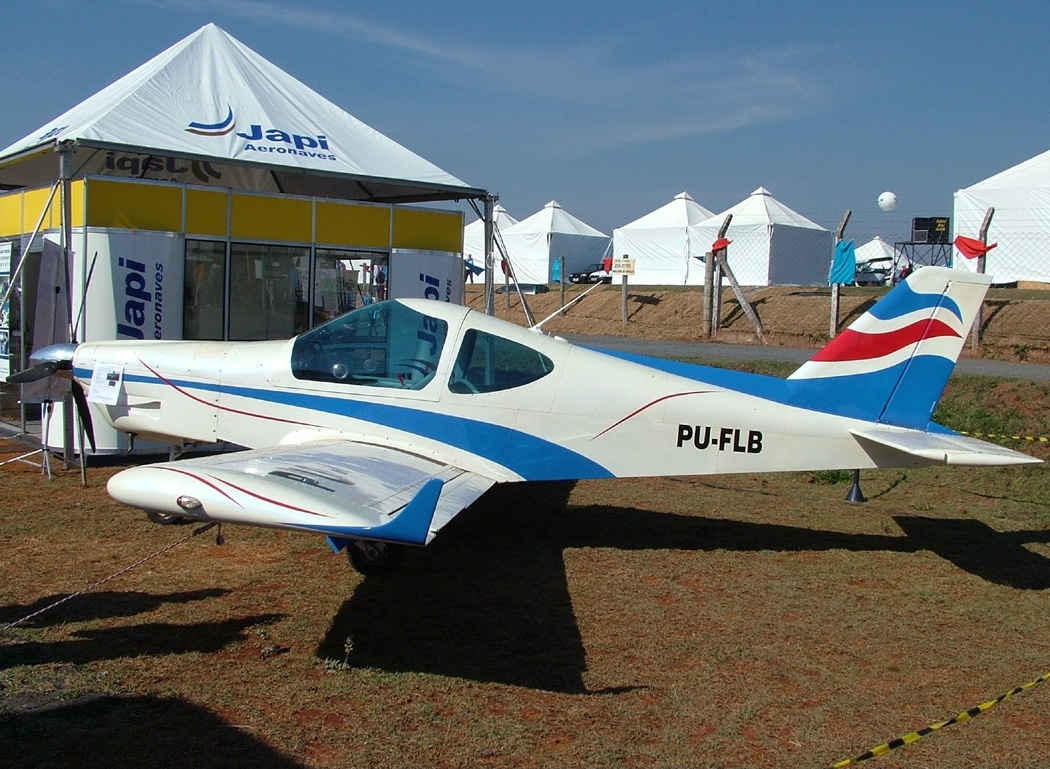

General information
- Type: Microlight aircraft
- National origin: Italy
- Manufacturer: Storm Aircraft
- Status: In production (2014)

History
- Developed from: Storm Century

The Storm RG Fury is an Italian microlight aircraft, designed and produced by Storm Aircraft of Sabaudia. Storm Aircraft was originally called SG Aviation srl. The aircraft is supplied complete and ready-to-fly.

The aircraft was originally marketed as the Storm RG.

== Design and development ==
Developed from the fixed gear Storm Century and designed for the Fédération Aéronautique Internationale European microlight class, the Storm Fury RG features a cantilever low-wing, a two-seats-in-side-by-side configuration enclosed cockpit under a forward-hinged bubble canopy, retractable tricycle landing gear and a single engine in tractor configuration.

The aircraft is made from aluminum sheet with some fibreglass parts. Improvements over the Storm Century include fewer panel joins, a newly redesigned vertical fin and drag-reduction. Its 7.9 m (25.9 ft) span rectangular wing mounts flaps and has a wing area of 10.27 m^{2} (110.5 sq ft). The cabin width is 112 cm (44 in). The standard engines used are the 100 hp (75 kW) Rotax 912ULS and the 115 hp (86 kW) Rotax 914 turbocharged powerplant.

The Fury RG has a typical empty weight of 290 kg (640 lb) and a gross weight of 450 kg (990 lb), giving a useful load of 160 kg (350 lb). With full fuel of 120 litres (26 imp gal; 32 US gal) the payload for pilot, passenger and baggage is 73 kg (161 lb).

The standard day, sea level, no wind, take off with a 100 hp (75 kW) engine is 125 m (410 ft) and the landing roll is 160 m (525 ft).

== Specifications (Fury RG) ==
Data from Bayerl and Storm Aircraft

General characteristics

- Crew: one
- Capacity: one passenger
- Length: 7.20 m (23 ft 7 in)
- Wingspan: 7.9 m (25 ft 11 in)
- Wing area: 10.27 m^{2} (110.5 sq ft)
- Empty weight: 290 kg (639 lb)
- Gross weight: 450 kg (992 lb)
- Fuel capacity: 120 litres (26 imp gal; 32 US gal)
- Powerplant: 1 × Rotax 912ULS four cylinder, air and liquid-cooled, four stroke aircraft engine, 75 kW (100 hp)
- Propellers: 2-bladed ground adjustable composite

Performance

- Maximum speed: 260 km/h (160 mph, 140 kn)
- Cruise speed: 245 km/h (152 mph, 132 kn)
- Stall speed: 60 km/h (37 mph, 32 kn) flaps down
- Never exceed speed: 320 km/h (200 mph, 170 kn)
- Range: 1,600 km (990 mi, 860 nmi)
- Rate of climb: 6 m/s (1,200 ft/min)
- Wing loading: 43.8 kg/m^{2} (9.0 lb/sq ft)
