= La Scarzuola =

Architectural complex in Umbria, Italy

Coordinates: 42.8985°N 12.1536°E

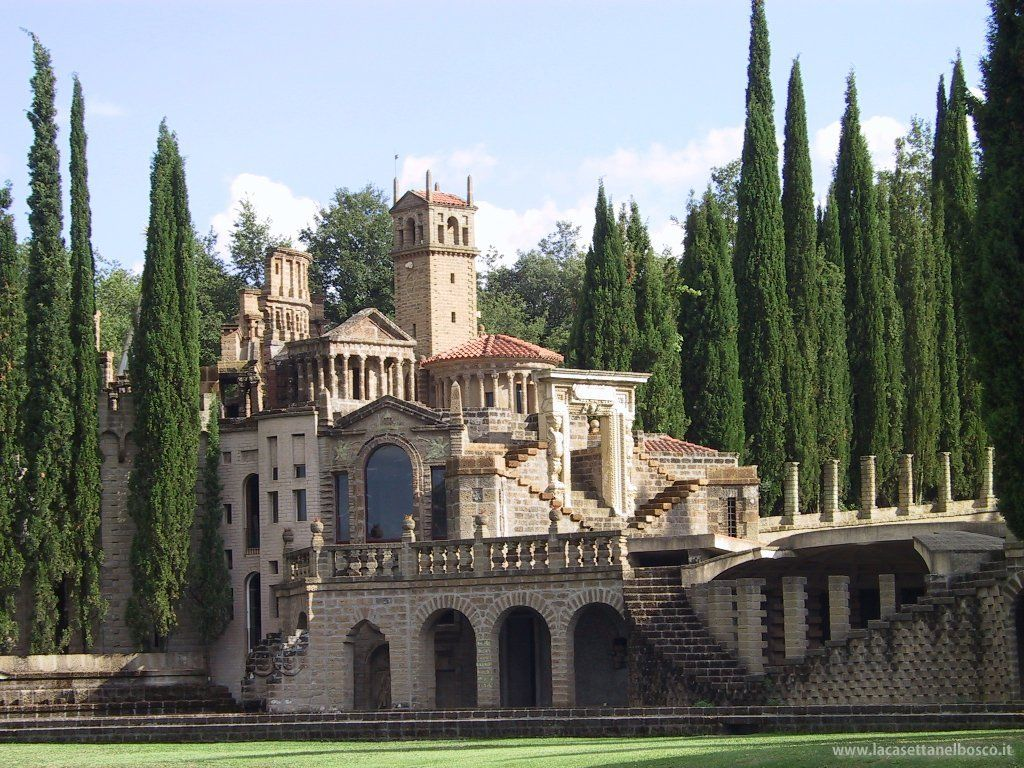
The ideal city at La Scarzuola

La Scarzuola is an architectural complex in Umbria, located in Montegiove hamlet in the comune of Montegabbione, Terni Province, Italy. It was originally the site of a 13th-century convent associated with St. Francis of Assisi, but was partially abandoned in the 19th century. In 1957, the Milanese architect Tomaso Buzzi purchased the convent site and converted it into a multi-faceted architectural complex mainly built with the remains of the convent. Buzzi built the complex as his interpretation of the ideal city.

== History ==
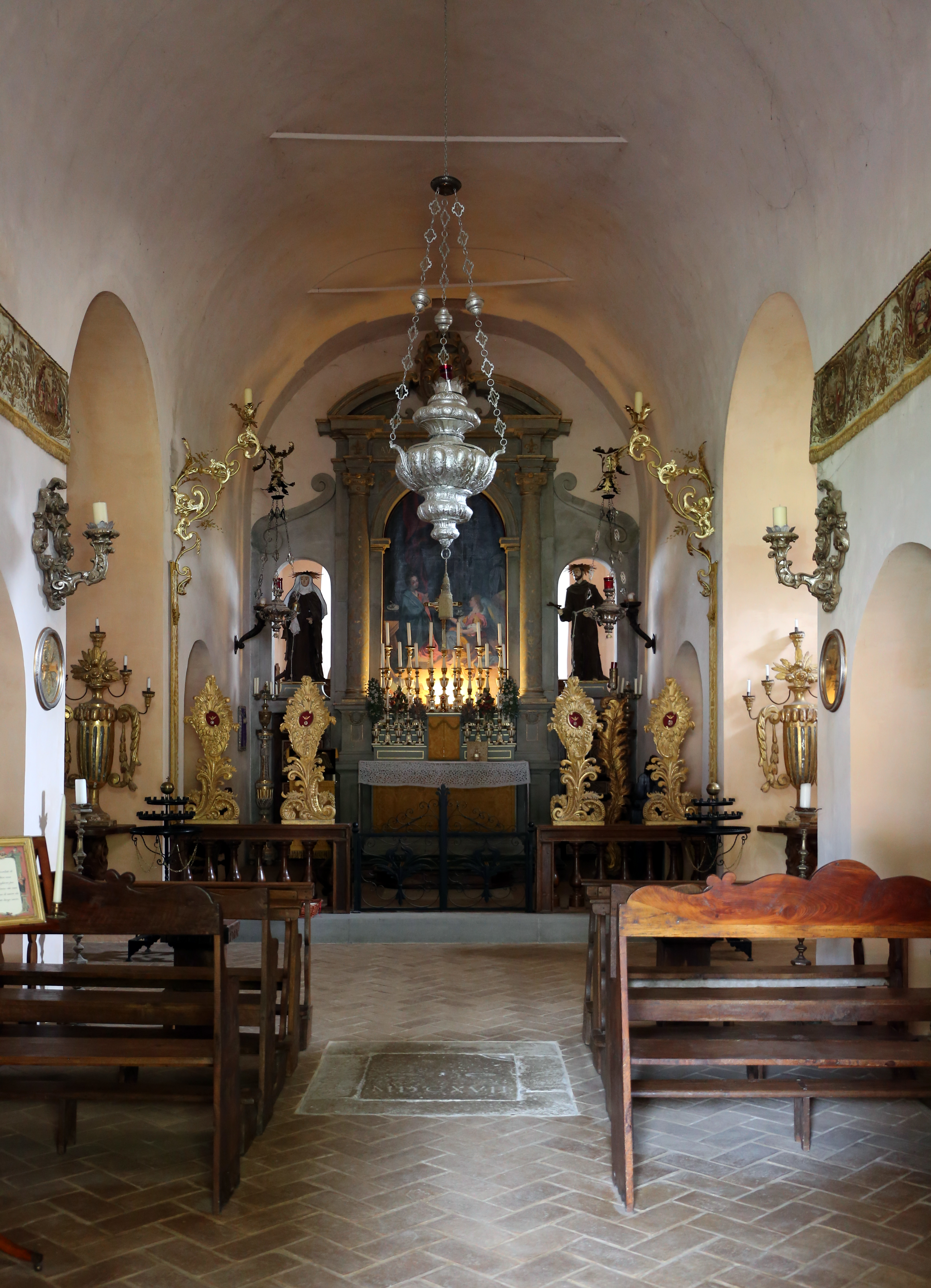
The church of St. Francis at the old convent of Scarzuola

The site was first mentioned in a chronicle of 1218 as the location where St. Francis built a hut and planted a rose and a laurel tree from which water miraculously gushed. In order to commemorate the site, the Counts of Marsciano funded the construction of a Church and Convent at the site, which was entrusted to the Franciscans. The convent was significantly renovated in the 16th century. The church was the site of site of burial for most of the Counts of Marsciano, but the last interment there was recorded in 1820, after which it was partially abandoned.

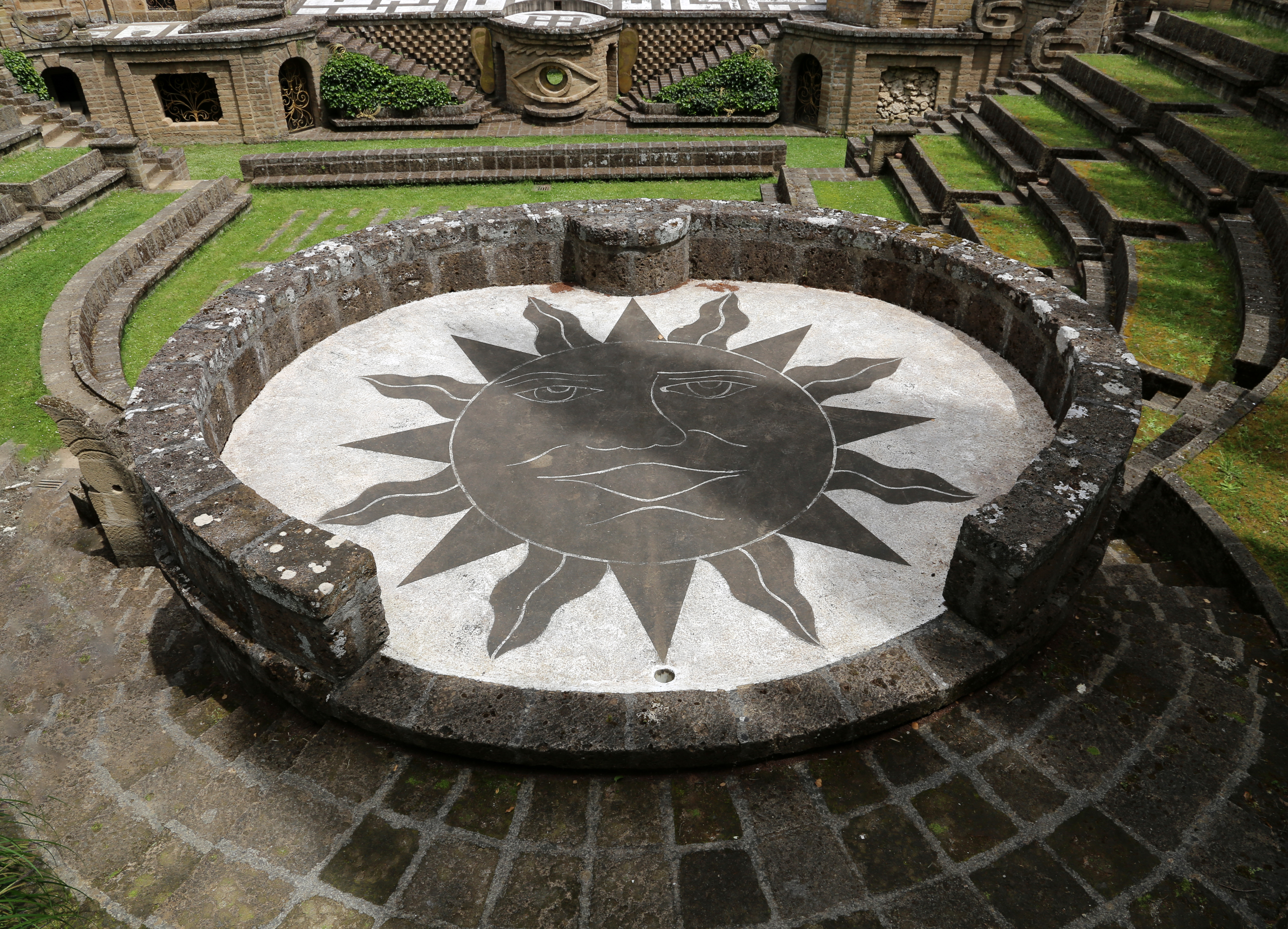
One of the amphitheaters on the site

The convent lay in ruins for most of the 19th and the first half of the 20th century, when it caught the eye of the already accomplished Tomaso Buzzi. Buzzi had found success as an architect and interior designer in Milan, and was enchanted by the partially ruined site. He purchased it in 1957 and, subsequently, dedicated the rest of his life to the construction of his complex there. Buzzi restored what remained of the convent and built a large complex of buildings and theaters behind the convent mainly using stone from the convent ruins. He built seven amphitheaters of varying sizes, which represented what Buzzi thought of as the inherent theatricality of life. He also built several structures and statues depicting different stages of his life, such as a giant stone female torso to represent lust, and a miniature Tower of Babel to represent vanity. Many of these structures have esoteric and alchemical meanings. Perhaps the most striking feature of the complex is the miniature city, which contains representations of buildings including Temple of Vesta, the Arc de Triomphe, and the Torre dell'Orologio in Mantua. All of these elements come together to represent Buzzi's interpretation of the ideal city.

After dedicating more than two decades of his life to the complex, Buzzi died in 1981, his vision unfinished. However, it was completed by his nephew Marco Solari. Today, La Scarzuola is a tourist site and can be entered for a small fee. The surreal nature of the complex has invited interest, and, in 2020, Gucci chose it as a modeling location for its Bloom campaign.
