= Villa Volpi =

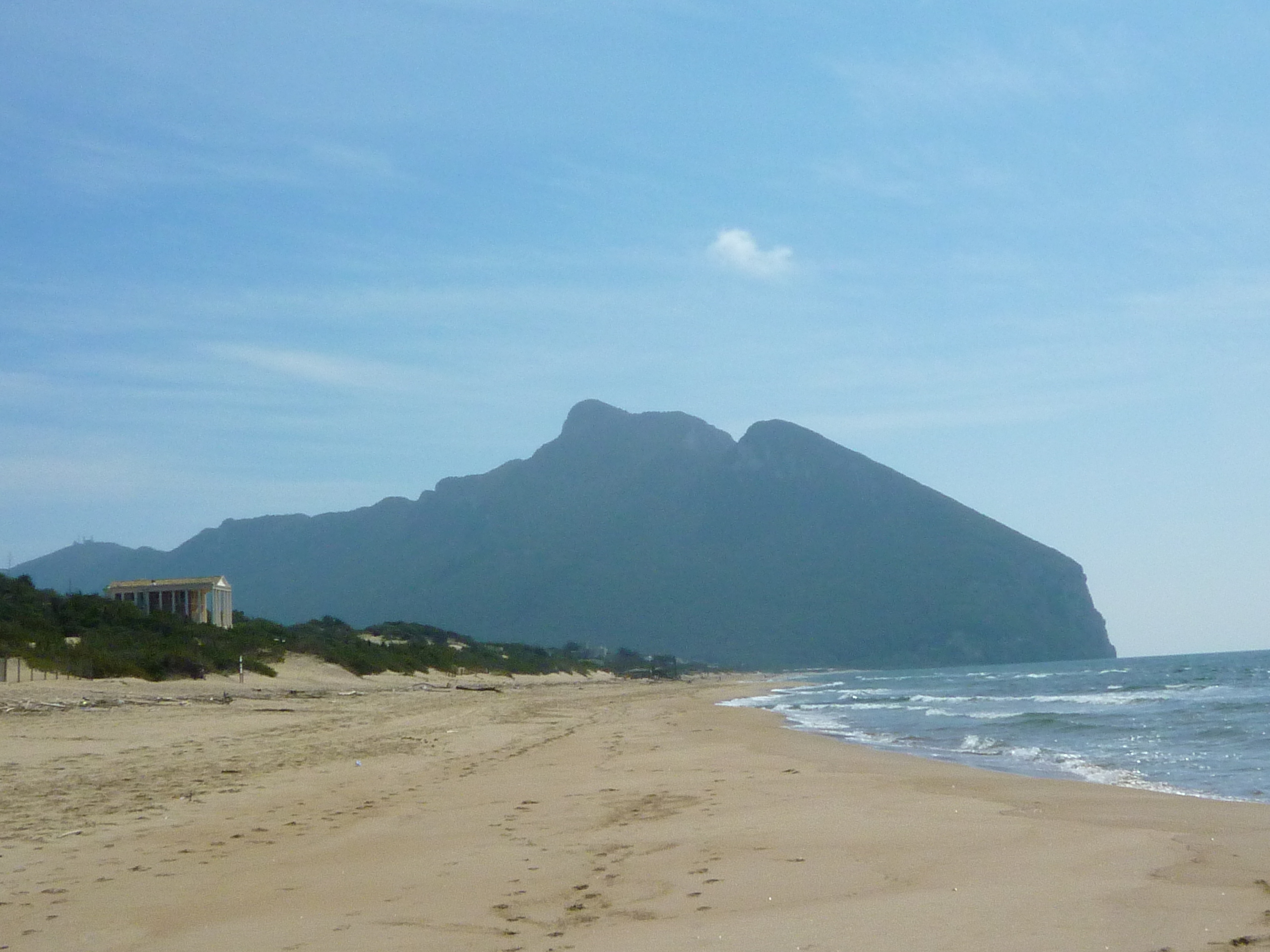
- Villa Volpi in Sabaudia
- Click on the map for a fullscreen view

General information
- Architectural style: Neoclassical
- Location: Sabaudia, Italy
- Coordinates: 41°15′54.9″N 13°01′48.1″E

Design and construction
- Architect: Tomaso Buzzi

Villa Volpi is a neoclassical seaside villa situated in Sabaudia, Italy.

== History ==
The villa was commissioned in 1952 by Countess Nathalie Volpi of Misrata, wife of Count Giuseppe Volpi, founder of the Venice Film Festival, and was designed by architect Tomaso Buzzi.

The villa has served as the filming location for several films including Divorce Italian Style and Compagni di scuola.

== Description ==
The villa, which is located within the boundaries of Circeo National Park, lies on a sand dune facing the Tyrrhenian Sea. Featuring a neoclassical and neo-Palladian style, it is composed by a central volume and two side wings. The central part of the villa resembles a classical Roman temple.

== Gallery ==
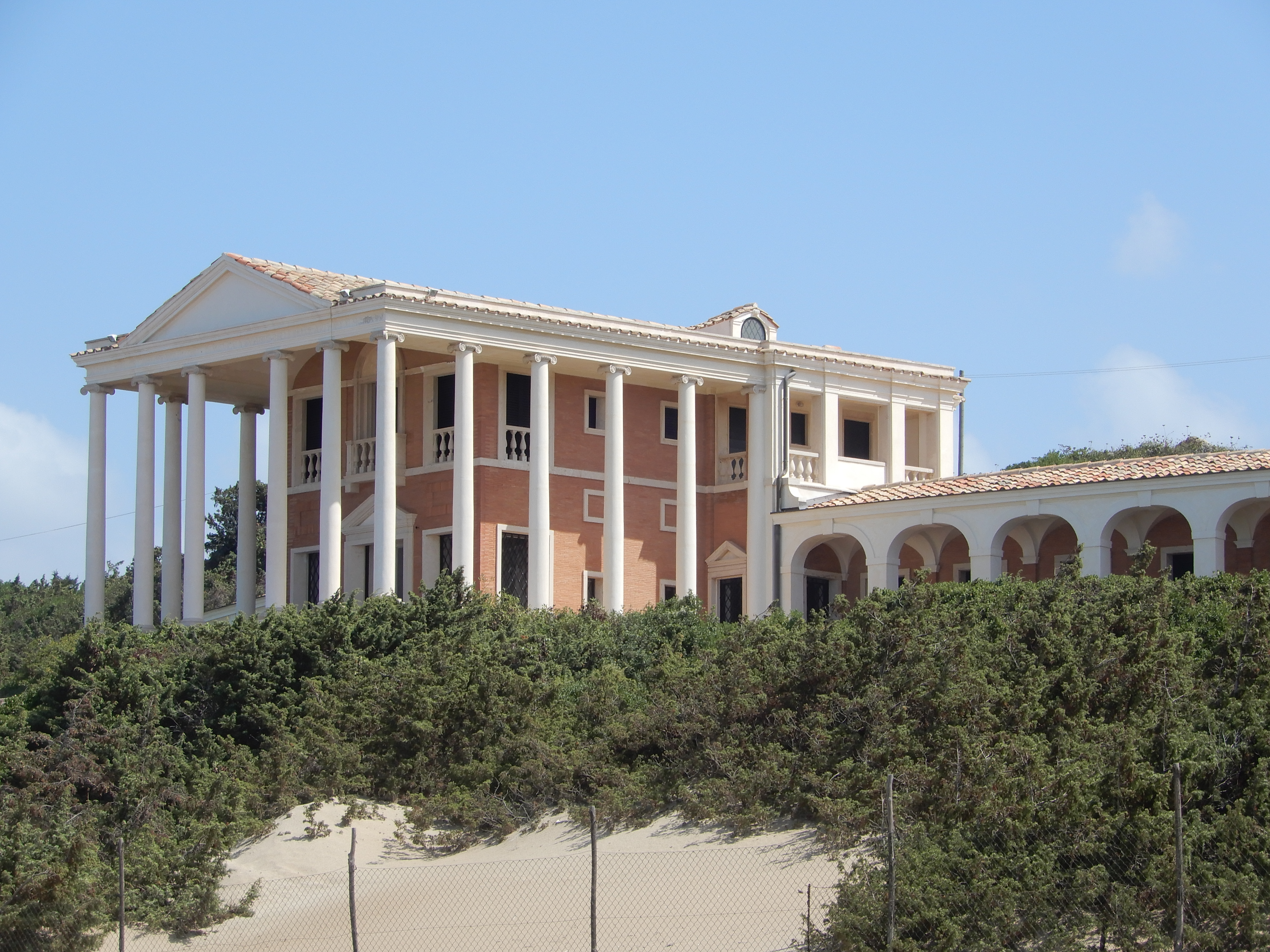

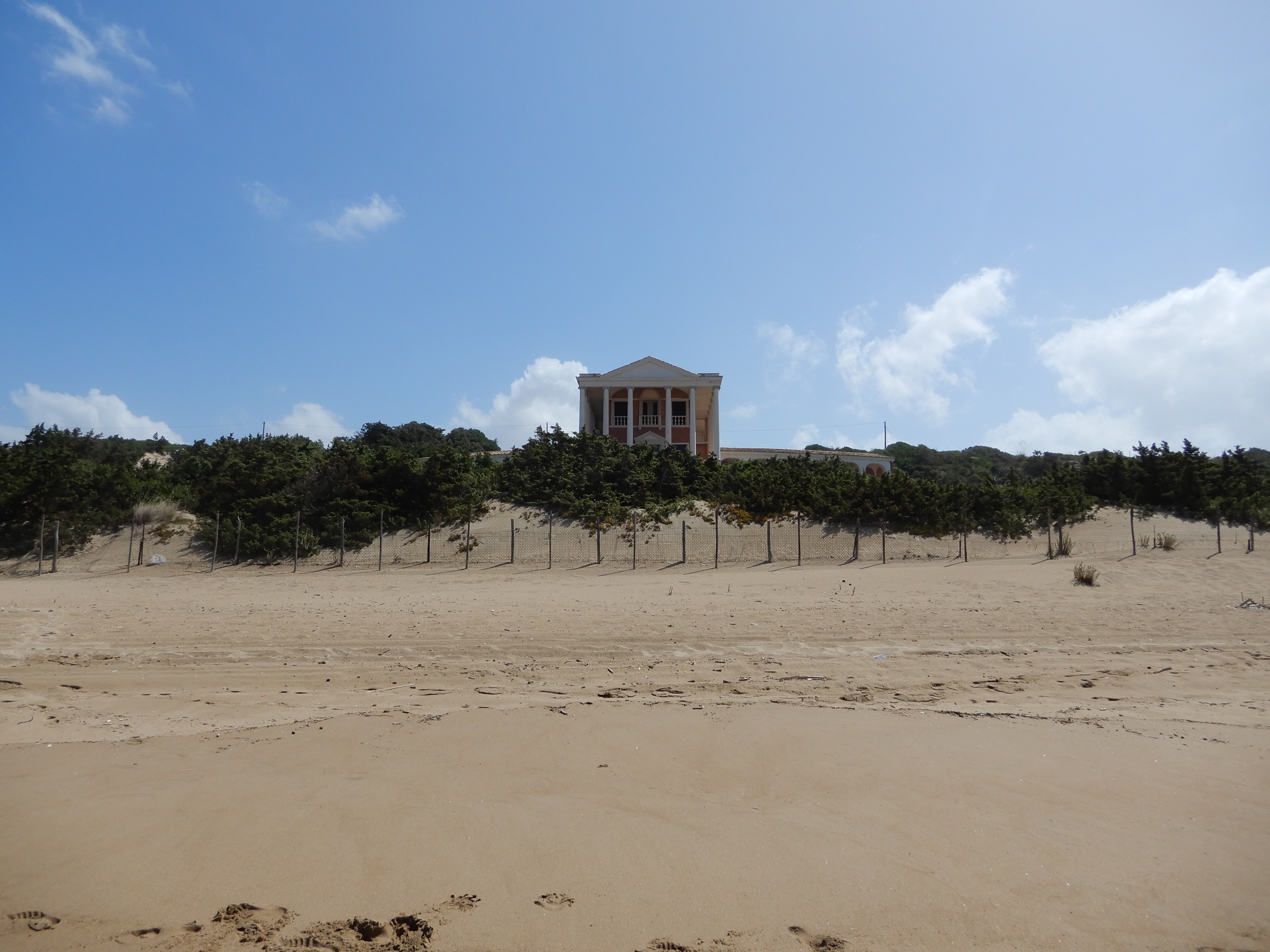

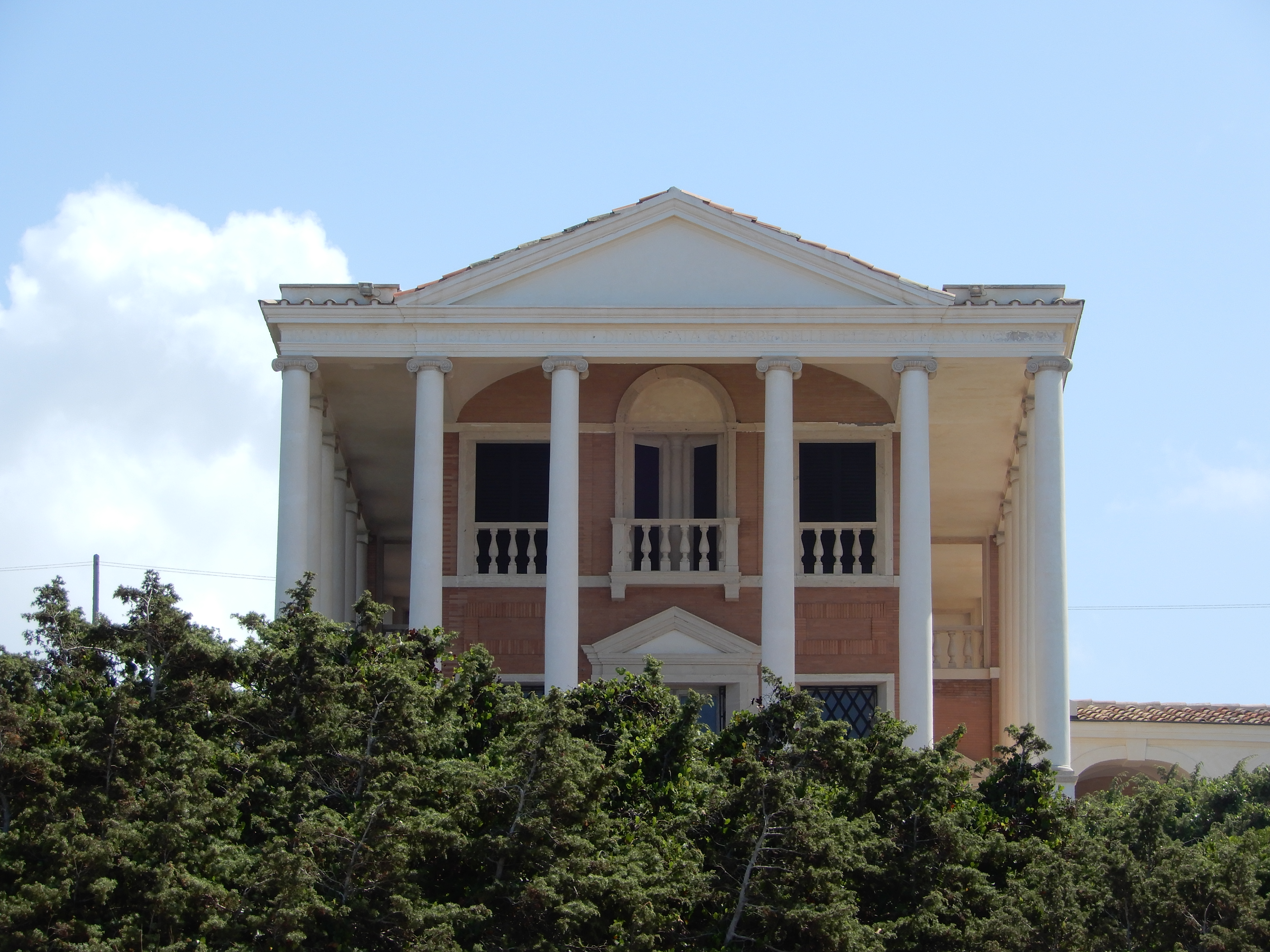
