= Storm 320E =

Italian microlight aircraft

Storm 320E00

General information
- Type: Microlight aircraft
- National origin: Italy
- Manufacturer: Storm Aircraft
- Status: Production completed
- Number built: 70 (1998)

The Storm 320E, sometimes written Storm 320 E, is an Italian microlight aircraft that was designed and produced by Storm Aircraft of Sabaudia. Storm Aircraft was originally called SG Aviation srl. When it was available the aircraft was supplied as a kit for amateur construction.

== Design and development ==
Designed for the Fédération Aéronautique Internationale European microlight class, the Storm 320E features a cantilever low-wing, a two-seats-in-side-by-side configuration enclosed cockpit under a forward-hinged bubble canopy, fixed tricycle landing gear with wheel pants, and a single engine in tractor configuration. A conventional landing gear version is designated the Storm 280.

The aircraft is made from aluminum sheet with some fibreglass parts. Its 8.60 m (28.2 ft) span wing employs a NACA 4415 airfoil, mounts flaps and has a wing area of 11.065 m^{2} (119.10 sq ft). The wing planform is rectangular, but the ailerons taper outboard, giving an overall tapered result. The cabin width is 112 cm (44 in). The acceptable power range is 80 to 115 hp (60 to 86 kW) and the standard engine used is the 80 hp (60 kW) Rotax 912UL powerplant.

The Storm 320E has a typical empty weight of 280 kg (620 lb) and a gross weight of 450 kg (990 lb), giving a useful load of 170 kg (370 lb). With full fuel of 61 litres (13 imp gal; 16 US gal) the payload for pilot, passenger and baggage is 126 kg (278 lb).

The standard day, sea level, no wind, take off with an 80 hp (60 kW) engine is 122 m (400 ft) and the landing roll is 152 m (499 ft).

The manufacturer estimated the construction time from the supplied kit as 400 hours or 250 hours from the quick-build kit.

== Operational history ==
By 1998 the company reported that 100 of the 280 and 320E model kits combined had been sold and 70 aircraft were completed and flying.

== Variants ==
Storm 320E
Tricycle landing gear version
Storm 280
Conventional landing gear version

== Specifications (Storm 320E) ==
Data from AeroCrafter and The Incomplete Guide to Airfoil Usage

General characteristics

- Crew: one
- Capacity: one passenger
- Length: 6.55 m (21 ft 6 in)
- Wingspan: 8.60 m (28.20 ft)
- Wing area: 11.06 m^{2} (119.1 sq ft)
- Airfoil: NACA 4415
- Empty weight: 280 kg (617 lb)
- Gross weight: 450 kg (992 lb)
- Fuel capacity: 61 litres (13 imp gal; 16 US gal)
- Powerplant: 1 × Rotax 912UL four cylinder, air and liquid-cooled, four stroke aircraft engine, 60 kW (80 hp)
- Propellers: 2-bladed ground adjustable composite

Performance

- Maximum speed: 293 km/h (182 mph, 158 kn)
- Cruise speed: 243 km/h (151 mph, 131 kn)
- Stall speed: 55 km/h (34 mph, 30 kn) flaps down
- Range: 999 km (621 mi, 540 nmi)
- Service ceiling: 3,700 m (12,000 ft)
- Rate of climb: 6.1 m/s (1,200 ft/min)
- Wing loading: 41 kg/m^{2} (8.3 lb/sq ft)
