= Tomaso Buzzi =

Italian architect and designer (1900–1981)

- Born: 30 September 1900; Sondrio, Italy
- Died: 1981 (aged 80–81); Rapallo, Italy
- Education: Regio Istituto Tecnico Superiore
- Occupations: Architect, interior designer
- Style: Italian Art Deco; Neo-Mannerism
- Projects: La Scarzuola; Villa Necchi Campiglio; Villa Volpi

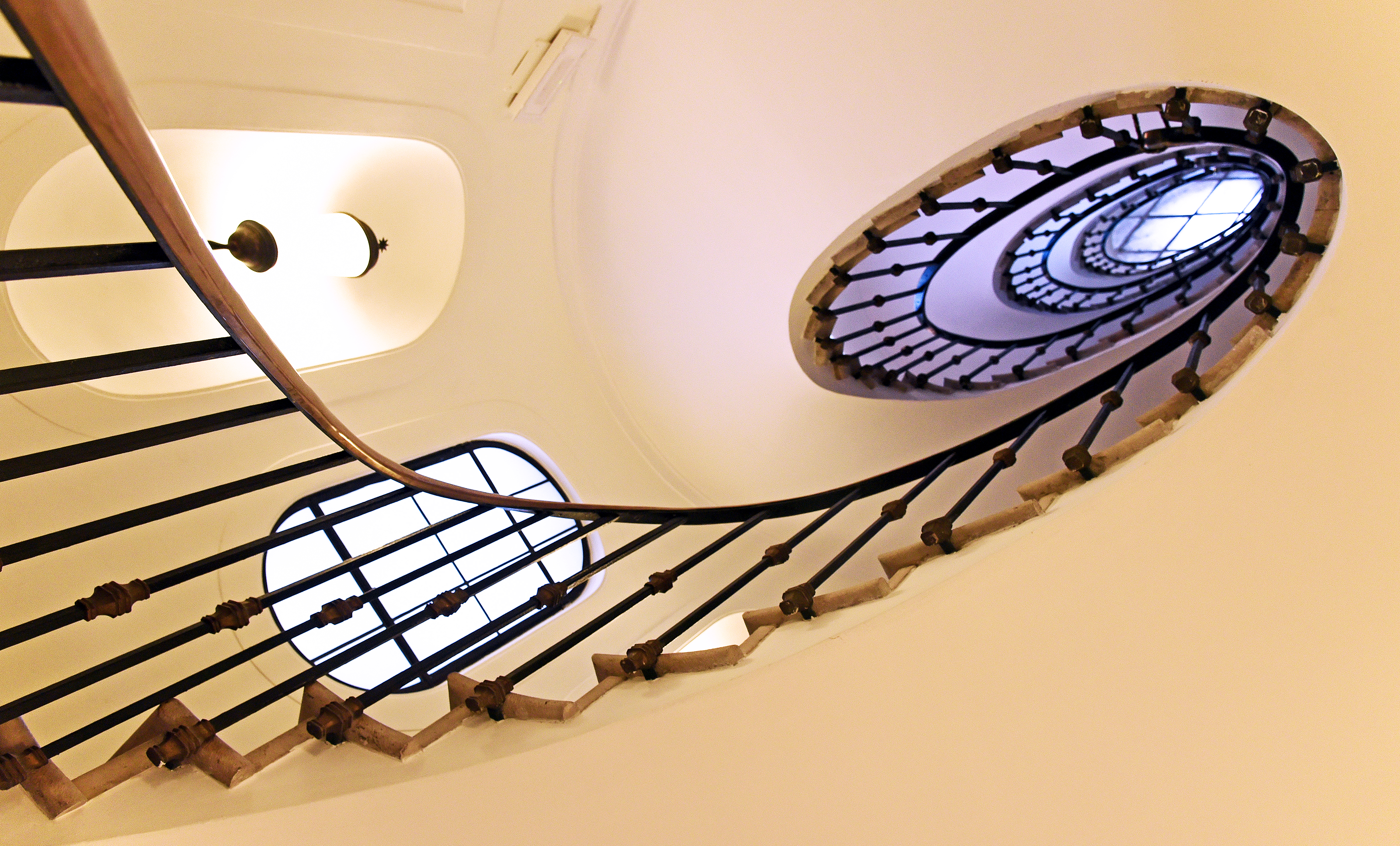
Oval staircase by Buzzi Palazzo Loredan Cini, Venice (1950s)

Tomaso Buzzi (1900–1981) was an Italian architect and designer. He is known for his interior design work in a number of historically significant buildings in Milan, Venice, and Turin, as well as the follies he constructed on his estate in Umbria.

== Early life and education ==
Tomaso Buzzi was born in Sondrio, 30 September 1900. He studied architecture at Politecnico di Milano (known at the time as Regio Istituto Tecnico Superiore).

== Career ==
Buzzi collaborated with Paolo Venini on a number of decorative glass pieces, and in the early 1930s, he was the creative director of Venini & C. glassworks in Murano.

He was a proponent of Italian Art Deco during the 1920s and 1930s, and was later associated with Neo-Mannerism. Buzzi was a favourite of the Milanese haut-bourgeoisie. He worked with Michele Marelli, Gio Ponti, Carla Visconti di Modrone, Emilio Lancia, and Pietro Chiesa.

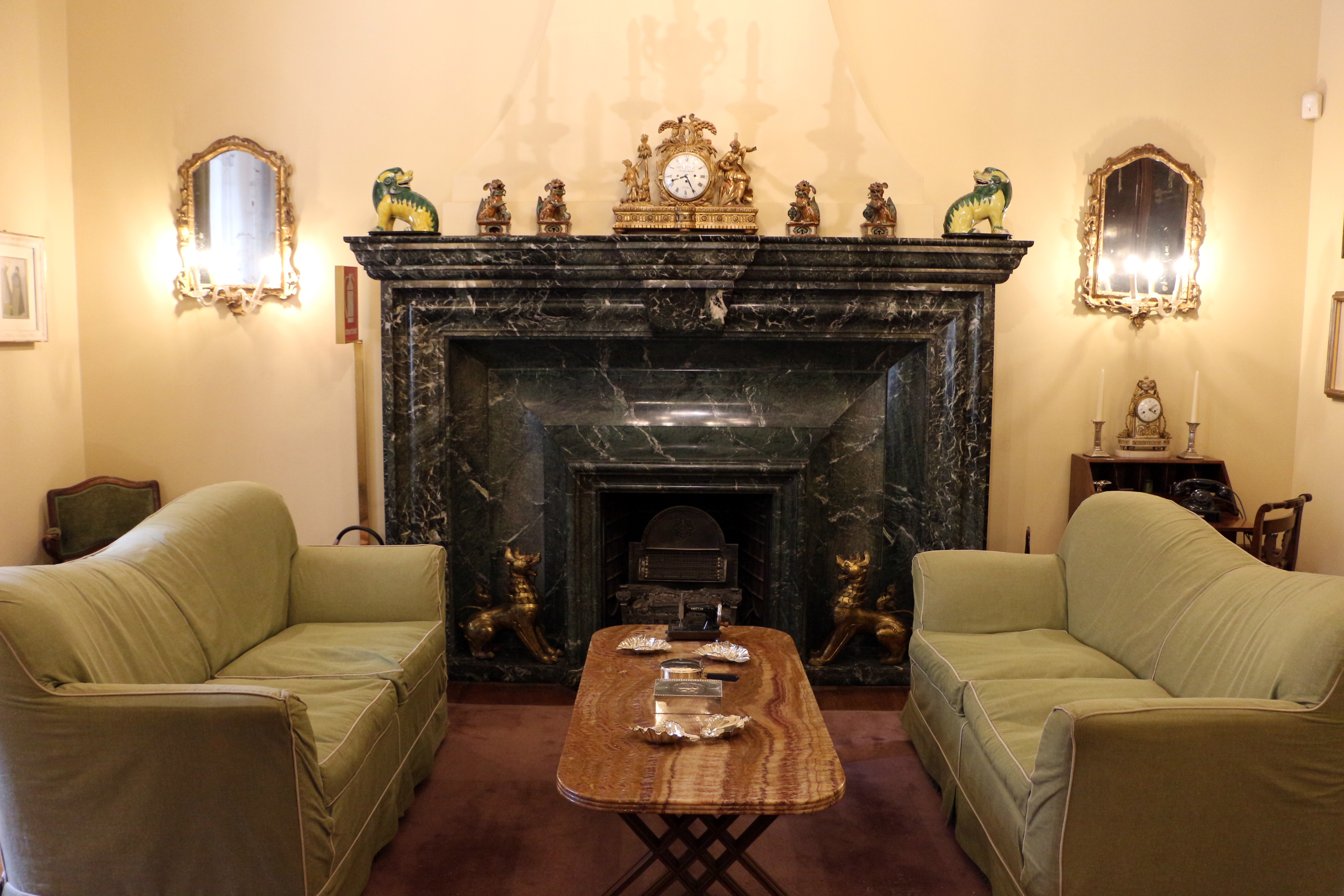
Fumoir of the Villa Necchi Campiglio, Milan

His work on the renovation of Villa Necchi Campiglio in Milan is preserved as a museum, and open to the public.

He designed the Villa Volpi a Sabaudia.

He renovated parts of the Palazzo d'Azeglio in Turin.

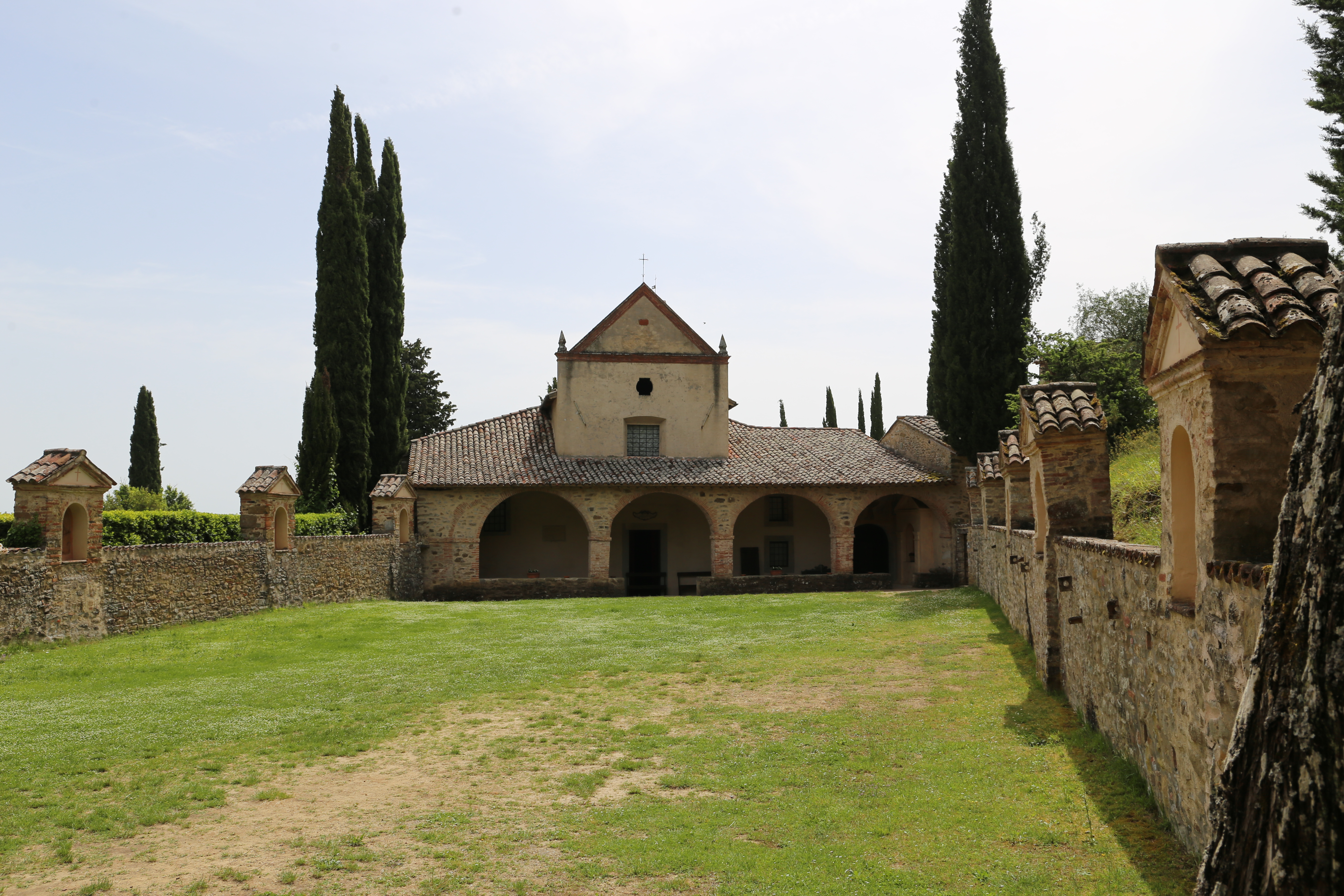
La scarzuola, Buzzi's private estate and garden

In his later years, he devoted considerable time and resources to his private estate and garden called la Scarzuola.

== Legacy ==
Buzzi died in Rapallo on 16 February 1981.
