= Villa Necchi Campiglio =

Building by Piero Portaluppi in Milan, Italy

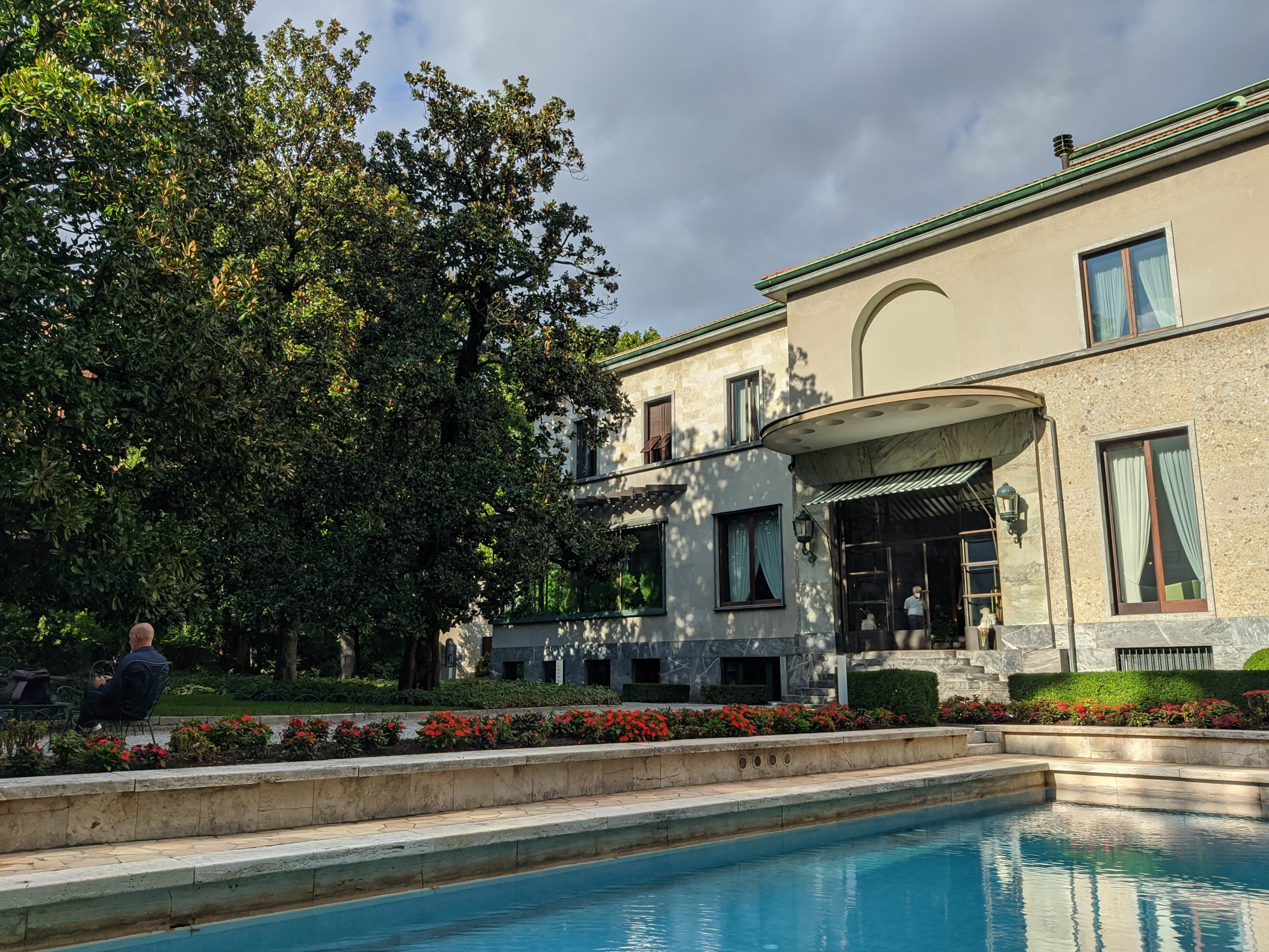
- View of façade from garden showing main entrance, swimming pool, and veranda (partially obscured by foliage)
- Interactive map showing the Villa Necchi Campiglio's location
- 45.4683°N 9.2018°E
- Location: Via Mozart, 14; Milan, Italy

History
- Built: 1932–1935

Site notes
- Architects: Piero Portaluppi; Tomaso Buzzi (post-war renovations)
- Architectural style: Rationalist
- Owner: Fondo per l'Ambiente Italiano (FAI)
- Website: fondoambiente.it/villa-necchi-campiglio-eng/

Villa Necchi Campiglio is a historic residence (house museum) located at via Mozart, 14, Milan. It was built between 1932 and 1935 as an independent single-family house designed by Piero Portaluppi, an important Milanese Rationalist architect, and is surrounded by a large private garden with a tennis court and swimming pool. This was the second swimming pool ever to be built in Milan after the municipal one, and the first to be built on private land.

== History ==
This central yet serene and tree-lined area attracted Angelo Campiglio and the Necchi sisters, originally from Pavia, who sought a residence in Milan. After acquiring the land around 1930, the architectural design of the new home was entrusted to Piero Portaluppi, and its construction took place between 1932 and 1935 by the Gadola Firm. The house was envisioned as an elegant yet comfortable dwelling, modern in both style and facilities, as evidenced by the inclusion of an elevator, a dumbwaiter, intercoms and telephones, and a heated swimming pool.

Beginning in 1938, and for the next twenty years, the Necchi Campiglio family engaged architect Tomaso Buzzi to redesign the exterior and subsequently the furnishings of some rooms in a style inspired by 18th-century art, which was softer and more elaborate compared to the original minimalism of Portaluppi's spaces.

Angelo Campiglio died in 1984; sisters Nedda and Gigina died in 1993 and 2001, respectively. Without heirs, the sisters were concerned with finding a suitable purpose for the house, ultimately bequeathing it to FAI (Italian Environmental Fund). The villa underwent restoration under the direction of architect Piero Castellini. The works required over three years and an expenditure of approximately six million Euros. Upon completion, the villa was opened to the public in May 2008.

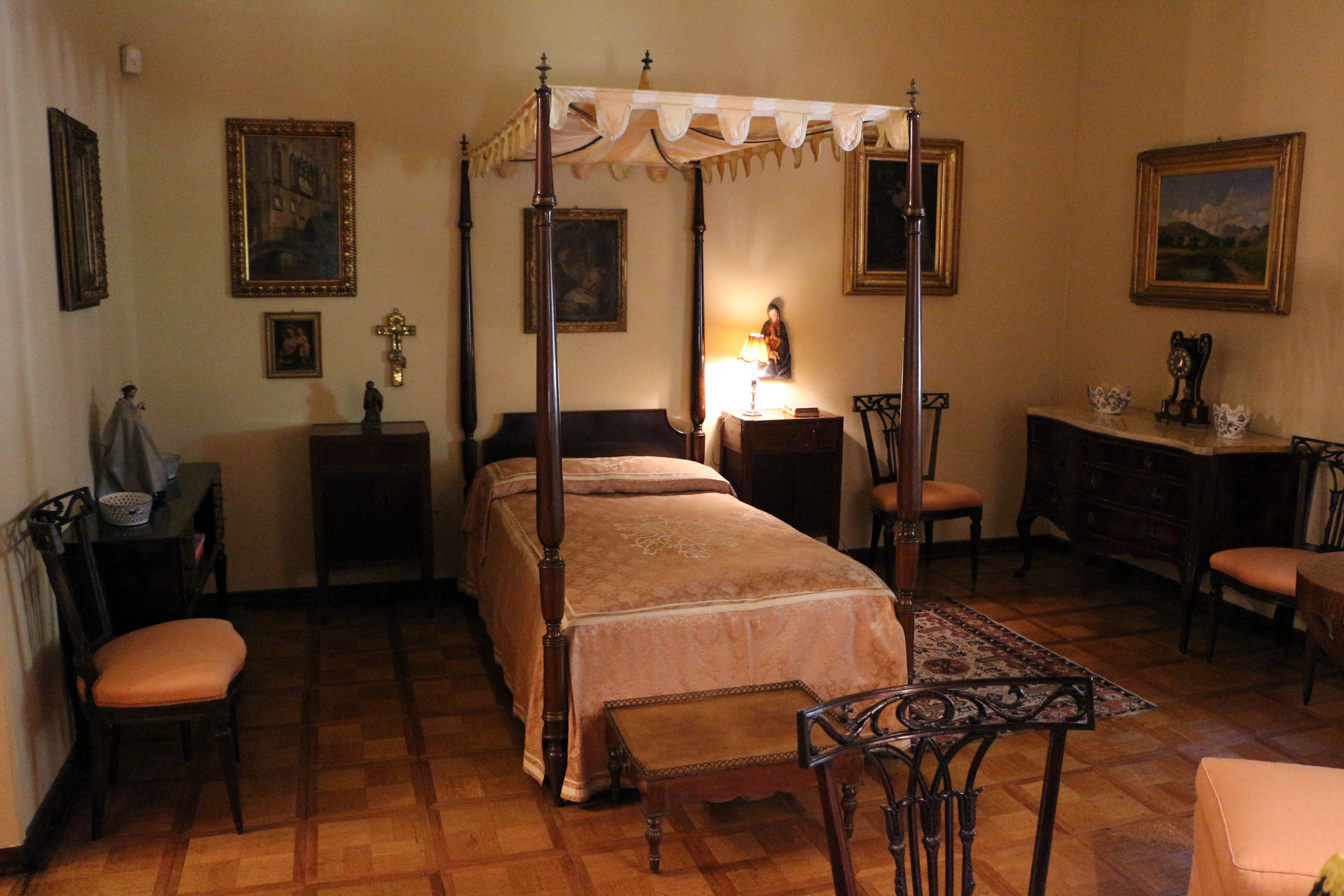
Nedda Necchi's bedroom

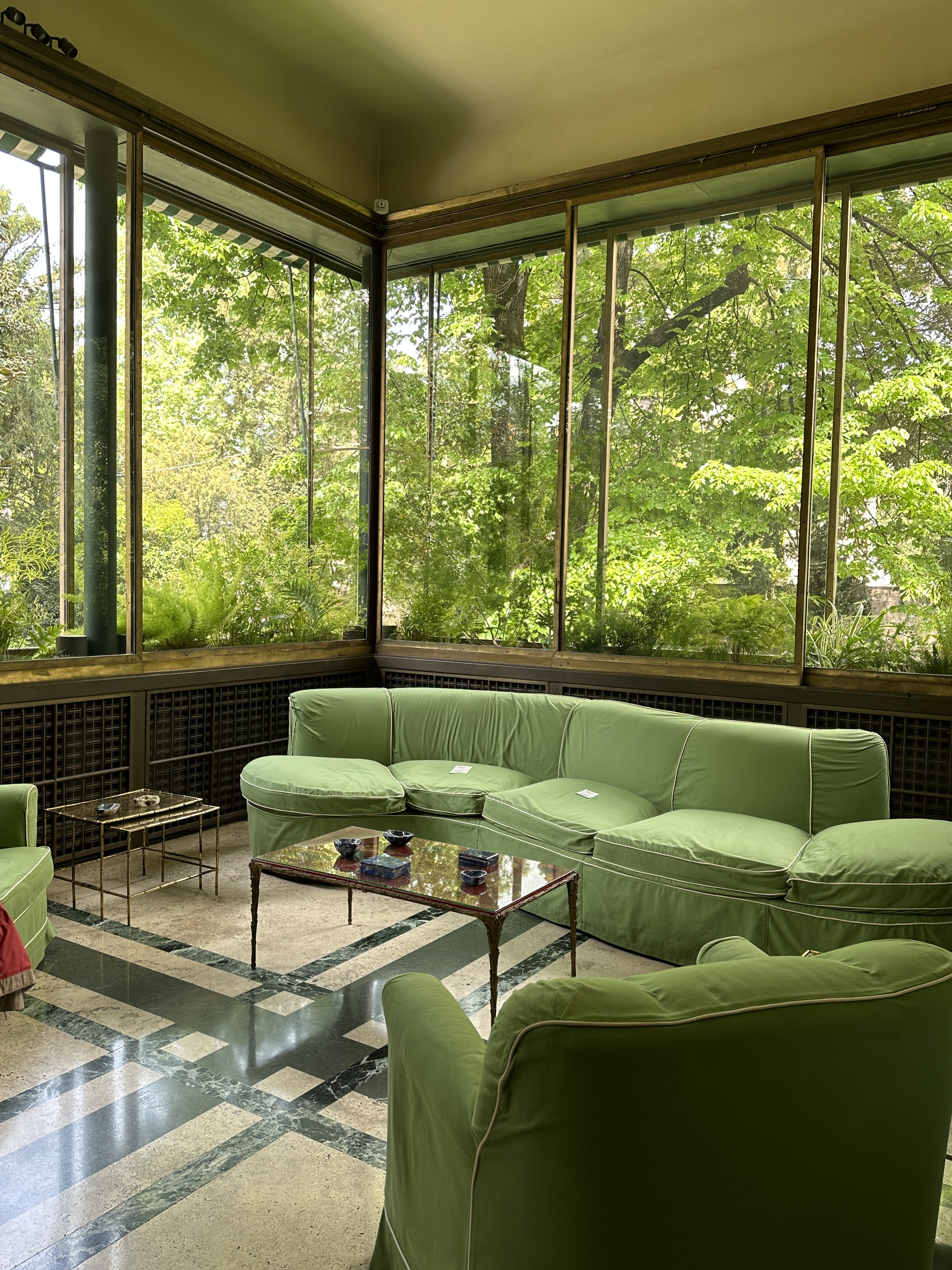
Winter garden or green room (enclosed veranda)

The black-tiled bathroom

== In popular culture ==
In 2009, Luca Guadagnino's film I Am Love was filmed at the villa. The movie, which narrates a fictional story, features the wealthy Milanese Recchi family living in the mansion, a name evidently inspired by the villa's original owners. The house also features in Ridley Scott's 2021 film House of Gucci.

== Publications ==
- Borromeo, Dina Lucia (2008). Villa Necchi Campiglio a Milano. Milan: Skira. ISBN 978-88-572-0079-8.
