= Storm Aircraft =

Italian light aircraft manufacturer

- Company type: Privately held company
- Industry: Aerospace
- Founded: 1981
- Headquarters: Sabaudia, Italy
- Products: Kit aircraft Microlight aircraft Aircraft parts
- Owner: Avionav
- Website: www.stormaircraft.com

Storm Aircraft, also called the StormAircraft Group, is an Italian aircraft manufacturer based in Sabaudia. The company specializes in the design and manufacture of kit aircraft and microlight aircraft, predominantly for the European market, as well as sub-contract work for manufacturers of larger aircraft.

Storm Aircraft was originally called SG Aviation srl, but changed its name for brand alignment. The company works predominantly with aluminum sheet and fibreglass construction methods for its kit aircraft.

The company was acquired by the Tunisian aircraft manufacturer Avionav on 3 November 2021.

== History ==
Founded in 1981 by a group of French and Italian aeronautical engineers as SG Aviation, the company engaged in sub-contract work including the Aermacchi MB-339 empennage and Martin-Baker ejection seat mechanical units. The company has designed and produced cold parts for engine nacelles, including inlets, fan cowls and EBU and systems-to-engine interfaces.

The company has also sold over 1200 kit and complete aircraft to customers in 20 countries.

== Aircraft ==
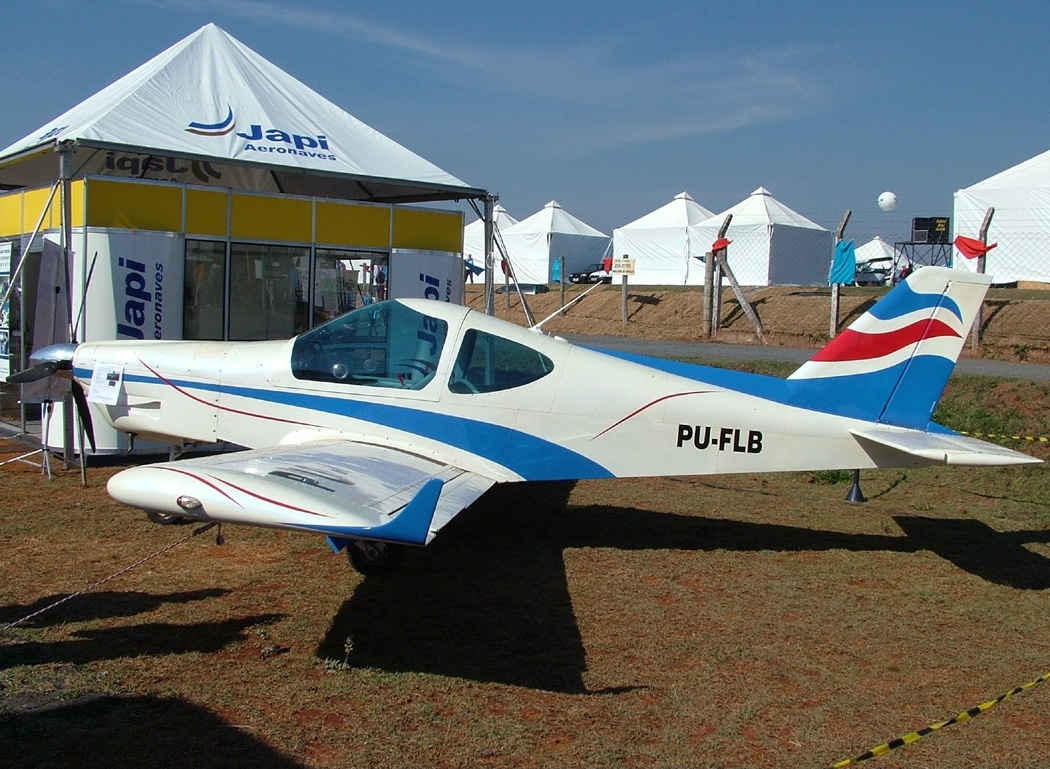
Storm RG

Summary of aircraft built by SG Aviation and Storm Aircraft
Model name	First flight	Number built	Type
Storm 280			two seat low-wing microlight aircraft
Storm 300			two seat low-wing homebuilt aircraft
Storm 320E			two seat low-wing microlight aircraft
Storm Century			two seat low-wing microlight aircraft
Storm Rally			two seat high-wing microlight aircraft
Storm RG Fury			two seat retractable gear low-wing microlight aircraft
Storm Sea Storm			two to four seat amphibious flying boat homebuilt aircraft
