= Storm Rally =

Italian sports aircraft

- Storm Rally

General information
- Type: Sport aircraft
- National origin: Italy
- Manufacturer: Storm Aircraft Srl
- Designer: Giovanni Salsedo

History
- First flight: ca. 1991

The Storm Rally (originally marketed as the SG Aviation Rallye) is a sport aircraft of composite construction developed in Italy in the 1990s.

== Design and development ==
The Rally is a high-wing, strut-braced monoplane of conventional design and is marketed in factory-built or kit form. The cabin seats two, side-by-side, and the undercarriage is of fixed, tricycle configuration. The aircraft is available in two versions, one with a maximum takeoff weight of 450 kg (990 lb) in order to qualify as an ultralight under European Joint Aviation Authorities regulations and a "sport" version with a weight of 600 kg (1,320 lb) that qualifies as a special Light Sport Aircraft in the United States.

== Specifications (Ultralight) ==
General characteristics

- Crew: One pilot
- Capacity: 1 passenger
- Length: 7.1 m (23 ft 4 in)
- Wingspan: 8.60 m (28 ft 3 in)
- Wing area: 11.6 m^{2} (125 sq ft)
- Empty weight: 290 kg (640 lb)
- Gross weight: 450 kg (990 lb)
- Powerplant: 1 × Rotax 912 , 75 kW (100 hp)

Performance

- Maximum speed: 230 km/h (140 mph, 120 kn)
- Range: 1,500 km (940 mi, 820 nmi)
- Rate of climb: 6.5 m/s (1,300 ft/min)
