= Sabaudia =

- Comune
- Città di Sabaudia
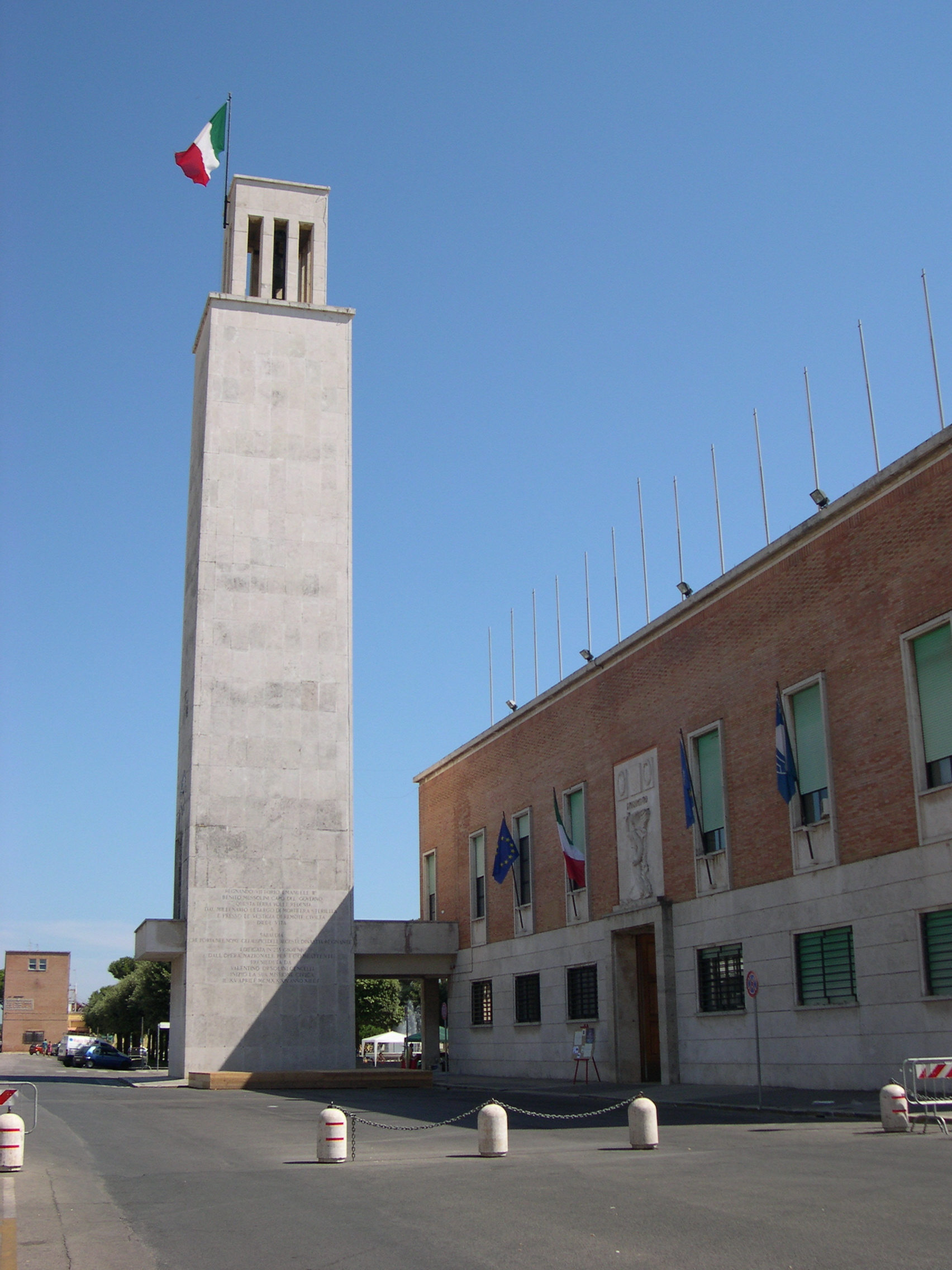
- Sabaudia Town Hall

- Coat of arms

- Location within Italy Location within Lazio
- Coordinates: 41°18′05″N 13°01′34″E
- Country: Italy
- Region: Lazio
- Province: Latina (LT)
- Founded: April 12, 1934
- Frazioni: Baia d'Argento, Bella Farnia, Borgo San Donato, Borgo Vodice, Cerasella, Mezzomonte, Molella, Sacramento, Sant'Andrea, Sant'Isidoro

Government
  - Mayor: Alberto Mosca (Civic list)

Area
  - Total: 144 km^{2} (56 sq mi)
- Elevation: 17 m (56 ft)

Population (31 July 2017)
  - Total: 20,613
  - Density: 143/km^{2} (371/sq mi)
- Demonym: Sabaudiani
- Time zone: UTC+1 (CET)
  - Summer (DST): UTC+2 (CEST)
- Postal code: 04016
- Dialing code: 0773
- ISTAT code: 059024
- Patron saint: SS. Annunziata
- Saint day: March 25
- Website: www.comune.sabaudia.lt.it

Sabaudia is a coastal town on the Tyrrhenian Sea, in the province of Latina, Lazio, in central Italy. Sabaudia's centre is characterised by several examples of Fascist architecture, as it was one of several towns built in the 1930s built on land reclaimed from swamps and wetlands under projects by Mussolini.

Villa Volpi, a neoclassical seaside villa built in 1952 for Countess Nathalie Volpi of Misurata, is located on the sand dunes of Sabaudia.

== History ==
In ancient Roman times, the extensive Villa of Domitian was built nearby and embellished by the emperor. Some of its remains have been excavated.

Sabaudia is one of several towns built on the reclaimed marshland of the ancient Pontine Marshes (Agro Pontino). This marsh was drained under orders from Benito Mussolini. Vast tracts of malaria-infested swamp were drained by workers transported from poor areas of northern Italy, leaving the coastal area south of Rome with rich farmland. These towns were built so that the fascist regime could demonstrate the successful draining of the marshland, as well as to provide housing communities for the increasing urban populations of Italy's large cities.

Architects Gino Cancellotti, Eugenio Montuori, Luigi Piccinato, and Alfredo Scalpelli were responsible for the town plan and many of the building. They had won a competition for the design of Sabaudia, sponsored by Mussolini. Work commenced on the town's construction on 5 August 1933 and was completed 253 days later.

The town itself is based on a rectangular grid road layout and rationalist architecture. It was named after the then-reigning Savoy dynasty (Italian: dinastia sabauda).

== Beaches ==
Sabaudia is well frequented by residents of Rome and Naples, as it is about halfway between the two cities. Sabaudia has 15 km of beach that were awarded the Blue Flag designation by the Foundation for Environmental Education (FEE). The FEE grades a beach based on the quality of water, recycling and waste management practices, the presence of lifeguards, and the inclusion of pedestrian paths and green areas. Surrounded by the Circeo Forest, access is provided by a boardwalk along the entire coast.

Il Monte Circeo is a prominent landmark in the area.

== Twin towns / sister cities ==
- Saint-Médard-en-Jalles, France
- El Vendrell, Spain

== Media ==
On November 20, 2024, Netflix released a series set in Sabaudia.

== Sources ==
- Burdett, Richard (1982). Sabaudia: città nuova fascista. London: Architectural Association.
- Muratore, Giorgio; Daniela Carfagna; Mario Tieghi (1999). Sabaudia, 1934: il sogno di una città nuova e l'architettura razionalista. Sabaudia: A. Boschi.
- The Beaches of Rome: Ultimate Guide dolcevespa.com. Retrieved 2019-07-08
