= List of aircraft (Pi–Pz) =

This is a list of aircraft in alphabetical order beginning with 'Pi–Pz'.

== Pi–Pz ==
=== Piaggio ===
(Societa Anonima Piaggio / Industrie Aeronautiche e Meccaniche Rinaldo Piaggio SpA)

- Piaggo-D'Ascanio helicopter
- Piaggio P.2
- Piaggio P.3
- Piaggio P.6
- Piaggio P.7
- Piaggio P.8
- Piaggio P.9
- Piaggio P.10
- Piaggio P.11
- Piaggio P.12
- Piaggio P.16
- Piaggio P.23
- Piaggio P.23R
- Piaggio P.32
- Piaggio P.50
- Piaggio P.108
- Piaggio P.111
- Piaggio P.119
- Piaggio P.127
- Piaggio P.133
- Piaggio P.136
- Piaggio P.148
- Piaggio P.149
- Piaggio P.150
- Piaggio P.155
- Piaggio P.166 Albatross
- Piaggio P.180 Avanti
- Piaggio PD.1 (Ing. Corradino D'Ascanio at Piaggio)
- Piaggio PD.2 (Ing. Corradino D'Ascanio at Piaggio)
- Piaggio PD.3 (Ing. Corradino D'Ascanio at Piaggio)
- Piaggio PD.4 (Ing. Corradino D'Ascanio at Piaggio)
- Piaggio PD.808

=== Piasecki ===
((Frank N) Piasecki Helicopter Corp, Morton, PA)

- Piasecki H-16 Transporter
- Piasecki H-21 Shawnee
- Piasecki H-25 Army Mule
- Piasecki H-27
- Piasecki HJP
- Piasecki HRP Rescuer
- Piasecki HUP Retriever
- Piasecki R-16 Transporter
- Piasecki VZ-8 Airgeep
- Piasecki X-49A
- Piasecki 16H Pathfinder
- Piasecki PA-2B
- Piasecki PA-4 Seabat
- Piasecki PA-39
- Piasecki PA-59
- Piasecki PA-97 Helistat
- Piasecki PD-22
- Piasecki PV-1
- Piasecki PV-2
- Piasecki PV-3
- Piasecki PV-14
- Piasecki PV-15
- Piasecki PV-17
- Piasecki PV-18

=== Piccard ===
(Bertrand Piccard)

- Piccard Eureka

=== Piccard-Borschberg ===
- Piccard-Borschberg Solar Impulse

=== Picken ===
(H B Picken Co, Hamilton, OH)

- Picken Helicon

=== Pickering-Pearson ===
- Pickering-Pearson KP.2

=== Piel ===
(Claude Piel)

- Piel CP.10 Pinocchio
- Piel CP.20 Pinocchio I
- Piel CP.40 Donald
- Piel CP.402
- Piel CP.41
- Piel CP.100
- Piel CP.140
- Piel CP.500
- Piel Beryl
- Piel Diamant
- Piel Emeraude
- Piel Emeraude Club
- Piel Smaragd
- Piel Super Diamant
- Piel Super Emeraude
- Piel Pinocchio II
- Piel Saphir
- Piel Onyx
- Piel Zephir

=== Pietenpol ===
- Pietenpol Gnome Biplane
- Pietenpol Model T Biplane
- Pietenpol Air Camper
- Pietenpol Sky Scout

=== Pigeon ===
(Henry Pigeon Mast & Spar Co, Boston, MA 1900: Pigeon Hollow Spar Co, 131 Coleridge St, Boston, MA)

- Pigeon Scout
- Pigeon Flying Boat

=== PIK ===
(Polyteknikkojen Ilmailukerho - Finnish institute of technology flying club)

- PIK-1
- PIK-2 primary glider
- PIK-3a Kanttikolmonen
- PIK-3c Kajava
- PIK-4 primary glider
- PIK-5 Cumulus variants b, c
- PIK-6
- PIK-7 Harakka primary glider
- PIK-10 Motorbaby
- PIK-11 Tumppu
- PIK-12
- PIK-13
- PIK-14
- PIK-15 Hinu
- PIK-16 Vasama
- PIK-17a Tumppi
- PIK-17b Tintti
- PIK-19
- PIK-20 Tiu variants A, B, D, E
- PIK-21 Super Sytky
- PIK-22
- PIK-23 Towmaster
- PIK-24 Pileus motorglider
- PIK-26
- PIK-25 Varttimarkka First flight on 21/6/2007
- PIK-27 Sehinu glider tug
- PIK-30 motorglider

=== Pilatus ===
- Pilatus B-4
- Pilatus P-1
- Pilatus P-2
- Pilatus P-3
- Pilatus P-4
- Pilatus P-5
- Pilatus PC-6 Porter and Turbo Porter
- Pilatus PC-7
- Pilatus PC-7 Mk.II
- Pilatus PC-9
- Pilatus PC-10
- Pilatus PC-11/Pilatus B-4
- Pilatus PC-12
- Pilatus PC-12 NG
- Pilatus PC-21
- Pilatus PC-24
- Pilatus SB-2 Pelican
- Pilatus U-28A

=== Pilgrim ===
(American Airplane & Engine Corp (Fairchild), Farmingdale, NY)

- Pilgrim 100
- Pilgrim C-24
- Pilgrim FC-2
- Pilgrim KR-34
- Pilgrim KR-135

=== Pilots Right Stuff ===
(Brannenburg, Germany)

- PRS One
- PRS Peak
- PRS Pilot One

=== Pinaire ===
- Pinaire Ultra-Aire

=== Pine ===
- Pine Super "V" Bonanza

=== Pintsch ===
(Austria)

- Pintsch Schwalbe

=== Pioneer ===
(American Aeronautical Corporation, New York, NY)

- Pioneer 1933 Biplane

=== Piper ===
(also, The New Piper Aircraft, Inc - 1995–2005; Piper Aircraft, Inc - 2005 to current)

- Piper AE
- Piper C-83
- Piper HE
- Piper L-4
- Piper L-14
- Piper L-18
- Piper L-21
- Piper L-59
- Piper LBP
- Piper LNP
- Piper O-59 Grasshopper
- Piper PT-1
- Piper U-7
- Piper U-11
- Piper UO
- Piper J-2 Cub
- Piper J-3 Cub
- Piper J-4 Cub Coupe
- Piper J-5 Cub Cruiser
- Piper M350
- Piper NE
- Piper P-1
- Piper P-2
- Piper P-4
- Piper PA-6 Sky Sedan
- Piper PA-7 Sky Coupe a.k.a. PWA-1
- Piper PA-8 Sky cycle
- Piper PA-11 Cub Special
- Piper PA-12 Super Cruiser
- Piper PA-14 Family Cruiser
- Piper PA-15 Vagabond
- Piper PA-16 Clipper
- Piper PA-17 Vagabond Deluxe
- Piper PA-18 Super Cub
- Piper PA-19
- Piper PA-20 Pacer
- Piper PA-21
- Piper PA-22 Caribbean
- Piper PA-22 Colt
- Piper PA-22 Tri-Pacer
- Piper PA-23 Apache
- Piper PA-23 Aztec
- Piper PA-24 Comanche
- Piper PA-25 Pawnee
- Piper PA-28 Arrow
- Piper PA-28 Archer
- Piper PA-28 Cadet
- Piper PA-28 Charger
- Piper PA-28 Cherokee
- Piper PA-28 Cherokee Challenger
- Piper PA-28 Warrior
- Piper PA-28 Pathfinder
- Piper PA-28 Dakota
- Piper PA-28 Turbo Dakota
- Piper PA-28R-300 Pilan
- Piper PA-29 Papoose
- Piper PA-30 Twin Comanche
- Piper PA-31 Cheyenne
- Piper PA-31 Chieftain
- Piper PA-31 Mojave
- Piper PA-31 Navajo
- Piper PA-32 Cherokee 6
- Piper PA-32 Lance
- Piper PA-32 Saratoga
- Piper PA-32 Cherokee Arrow
- Piper PA-33 Comanche
- Piper PA-34 Seneca
- Piper PA-35 Pocono
- Piper PA-36 Pawnee II
- Piper PA-36 Pawnee Brave
- Piper PA-38 Tomahawk
- Piper PA-40 Arapaho
- Piper PA-42 Cheyenne
- Piper PA-44 Seminole
- Piper PA-46 Malibu
- Piper PA-46 Mirage
- Piper PA-46 Meridian
- Piper PA-48 Enforcer
- Piper PA-60 Aerostar
- Piper PA-60 Sequoia
- Piper PT-1
- Piper Twin Stinson
- Piper Aerostar

=== Piper-Marriot ===
(William S Piper & E O Marriot, Los Angeles, CA)

- Piper-Marriot 1964 Autogyro

=== Pipistrel ===
(Pipistrel d.o.o Ajdovščina)

- Pipistrel Alpha Trainer
- Pipistrel Apis
- Pipistrel Apis 13
- Pipistrel Apis 15 M
- Pipistrel Panthera
- Pipistrel Sinus
- Pipistrel Spider
- Pipistrel Taurus
- Pipistrel Taurus G4
- Pipistrel Taurus Electro
- Pipistrel Virus
- Pipistrel Virus SW
- Pipistrel WATTsUP
- Pipistrel 801 eVTOL

=== Pisarenko ===
- Pisarenko VOP-1
- Pisarenko T

=== Pitcairn ===
(Pitcairn Aircraft Company)

- Pitcairn O-61
- Pitcairn OP-1 (PCA-2)
- Picairn OP-2 (PA-34)
- Pitcairn MX-157
- Pitcairn PA-1 Fleetwing
- Pitcairn PA-2 Sesquiwing
- Pitcairn PA-3 Orowing
- Pitcairn PA-4 Fleetwing 2
  - Pitcairn PA-4 Fleetwing II
  - Pitcairn Fleetwing DeLuxe
  - Pitcairn PA-4 Fleetwing
- Pitcairn PA-5 Mailwing
- Pitcairn PA-5 Sport Mailwing
- Pitcairn PA-6 Super Mailwing
- Pitcairn PA-7 Super Mailwing
- Pitcairn PA-8 Super Mailwing
- Pitcairn PA-18
- Pitcairn PA-19
- Pitcairn PA-20
- Pitcairn PA-21
- Pitcairn PA-22
- Pitcairn PA-24
- Pitcairn PA-33
- Pitcairn PA-34
- Pitcairn PA-36 Whirl Wing
- Pitcairn PA-39
- Pitcairn PA-44
- Pitcairn PAA-1
- Pitcairn PAA-2
- Pitcairn G-2
- Pitcairn-Cierva C-8
- Pitcairn-Cierva PCA-1
- Pitcairn-Cierva PCA-2
- Pitcairn-Cierva PCA-3
- Pitcairn-Larsen PA-36

=== Pitt ===
(Bruce & Gilbert Pitt, Hales Corners, WI)

- Pitt Yellow Jacket

=== Pitts ===
(John W Pitts and W P Kindree, Detroit, MI)

- Pitts Sky Car

=== Pitts ===
(Curtis Pitts)

- Pitts Pellet
- Pitts Samson
- Pitts Special Miss Dayton
- Pitts Special Li'l Monster
- Pitts S1 Special Special
- Pitts S1 Li'l Stinker L'il Stinker
- Pitts S1
- Pitts S2
- Pitts Model 12 Macho Stinker
- Pitts Model 13
- Pitts Model 14

=== Pivot-Koechlin ===
(Pivot et Paul Koechlin)

- Pivot-Koechlin monoplane

=== Planchais ===
(Robert Planchais)

- Planchais LD-45-IV

=== Plane Driven ===
(Trey Johnson / Glasair / Stoddard-Hamilton)

- Plane Driven PD-1

=== Platt ===
(Haviland Hull Platt, Philadelphia, PA)

- Platt Cyclogyro

=== Platt-LePage ===
((Haviland Hull) Platt-(Wynn Laurence) LePage Aircraft Co, Eddystone, PA)

- Platt-Le Page PL-3
- Platt-Le Page PL-4
- Platt-Le Page PL-5
- Platt-Le Page PL-8
- Platt-Le Page PL-9
- Platt-Le Page PL-11
- Platt-Le Page PL-12
- Platt-Le Page PL-14
- Platt-Le Page XR-1
- Platt-Le Page XR-1A

=== Platzer ===
(Michael Platzer, Ellenberg, Germany)

- Platzer Kiebitz
- Platzer Motte

=== Player ===
(William Earl Player & Harry Thalman, Salt Lake City, UT)

- Player 1936 Monoplane
- Player CT-6A Plxweve
- Player Sport

=== Plews ===
(J E Plews, Chicago, IL)

- Plews 1910 Biplane

=== Pliska ===
(John V Pliska and Gary Coggin, Midland, TX)

- Pliska 1912 Biplane

=== Plumb ===
(Barry G. Plumb)

- Plumb BGP1 Biplane

=== Plymouth ===
(Plymouth Development Corporation, NY)

- Plymouth A-A-2004

=== PLV ===
(PLV Chicago and Cicero, IL)

- PLV 1915 Biplane

=== PMBRA ===
(Rinji Gunyo Kikyu Kenkyu Kai - Provisional Military Balloon Research Association / 'Rikugun Kosho - Army Arsenals)

- Kaishiki No.1
- PMBRA Kaishiki No.2 Aeroplane
- PMBRA Kaishiki No.3 Aeroplane
- PMBRA Kaishiki No.4 Aeroplane
- PMBRA Kaishiki No.5 Aeroplane
- PMBRA Kaishiki No.6 Aeroplane
- PMBRA Kaishiki No.7 Aeroplane
- PMBRA Kaishiki No.7 Small Aeroplane
- PMBRA Army Type Mo (Maurice Farman Type) 1913 Aeroplane
- PMBRA Converted Type Mo (Maurice Farman Type) Aeroplane
- PMBRA Army Henri Farman Type Model 4 Aeroplane (Army Type Mo-4 Aeroplane)
- PMBRA Army Maurice Farman Type Model 6 Aeroplane (Army Type Mo-6 Aeroplane)
- PMBRA Army Maurice Farman 5 Aeroplane
- PMBRA Seishiki-1 Aeroplane
- PMBRA Seishiki-2 Aeroplane
- PMBRA Standard H-3 Trainer
- PMBRA Army Model 2 Ground Taxi-ing Trainer
- PMBRA Army Model 3 Ground Taxi-ing Trainer
- PMBRA Koshiki-1 Experimental Reconnaissance Aircraft
- PMBRA Koshiki-2 Experimental Fighter
- PMBRA Koshiki A-3 Experimental Long-range Reconnaissance Aircraft
- PMBRA Kaibo Gikai KB Experimental Flying Boat
- PMBRA Army Experimental Model 3 Fighter
- PMBRA Army Experimental Three-seat Light Bomber

=== Poage ===
(Jack Poage, Churchville, MD)

- Poage Eindekker

=== Poberezny ===
(Paul Poberezny, Milwaukee, WI)

- Poberezny P-5 Pober Sport
- Poberezny Pober Acro Sport
- Poberezny Pober Little Audrey
- Poberezny P-9 Pober Pixie
- Poberezny Pober Super Ace

=== Pocino ===
(José Pocino)

- Pocino PJ.1A

=== Podešva ===
(Podešva Air / Tomáš Podešva) (Podesva-Vyroba a opravy UL letadel, Ujezd, Czech Republic)

- Podesva Trener
- Let-Mont UL Tulák
- Podesva UL Piper
- Podesva Trener Baby

=== Podge ===
- Podge Parasol

=== Poeschel ===
(see: Pöschel)

=== Poite ===
- Poite 3

=== Polaris Motor ===
(Polaris Motor srl, Gubbio, Italy)

- Polaris AM-FIB
- Polaris FIB
- Polaris Skin

=== Polen ===
((Dennis N) Polen Aircraft, Portland, OR)

- Polen Special
- Polen Special II a.k.a. Temptress

=== Poligrat ===
(Poligrat-Development GmbH & Co KG)

- Poligrat PD-01 Master-Porter
- Poligrat PC-10 Twin-Porter

=== Polikarpov ===
- Polikarpov 2I-N1
- Polikarpov AO
- Polikarpov AP
- Polikarpov ARK-5
- Polikarpov BDP
- Polikarpov D
- Polikarpov D-2
- Polikarpov DI-1
- Polikarpov DI-2
- Polikarpov E-23
- Polikarpov ED-1
- Polikarpov I-1
- Polikarpov I-3
- Polikarpov I-5
- Polikarpov I-6
- Polikarpov I-7
- Polikarpov I-11
- Polikarpov I-13
- Polikarpov I-15
- Polikarpov I-152
- Polikarpov I-153
- Polikarpov I-16
- Polikarpov I-17
- Polikarpov I-180
- Polikarpov I-185
- Polikarpov I-187
- Polikarpov I-188
- Polikarpov I-190
- Polikarpov I-195
- Polikarpov IL-400
- Polikarpov ITP
- Polikarpov Ivanov
- Polikarpov L-2
- Polikarpov Limuzin
- Polikarpov LPL
- Polikarpov LSh
- Polikarpov Malyutka
- Polikarpov MP
- Polikarpov MPI-1
- Polikarpov MR-5
- Polikarpov MU-2
- Polikarpov NAK
- Polikarpov NB
- Polikarpov ODB
- Polikarpov PAM-11
- Polikarpov PB
- Polikarpov P-2
- Polikarpov P-5
- Polikarpov P-Z
- Polikarpov PM-1
- Polikarpov Po-2
- Polikarpov PR-12
- Polikarpov PT
- Polikarpov R-1
- Polikarpov R-2
- Polikarpov R-4
- Polikarpov R-5
- Polikarpov R-Z
- Polikarpov SKF
- Polikarpov SP
- Polikarpov SPB (I-16) (I-16 fighter-bomber)
- Polikarpov SPB (VIT-1) (VIT-1 variant)
- Polikarpov SPL
- Polikarpov SSS
- Polikarpov SVB
- Polikarpov TB-2
- Polikarpov TIS
- Polikarpov TPK
- Polikarpov U-2
- Polikarpov UTI-1
- Polikarpov UTI-2
- Polikarpov UTI-3
- Polikarpov UTI-4
- Polikarpov VIT-1
- Polikarpov VIT-2
- Polikarpov VP,K
- Polikarpov VT-11
- Polikarpov-Rafaelyants PR-5

=== Polish Miscellaneous constructors ===
- Borucki 1909 Monoplane
- Borucki 1909 Biplane
- Świeściak Polonia

=== Politecnico ===
- Politecnico P-110

=== Polliwagen ===
(Polliwagen Inc (Pres: Joseph P Alvarez), Garden Grove, CA)

- Polliwagen 1977 Monoplane

=== Polson ===
(Thor (Thomas) Polson, Long Beach, CA)

- Polson Special

=== Polyteknisk Flyvegruppe ===
(Polyteknisk Flyvegruppe - Flying Group of the Technical University of Denmark)

- Polyt V

=== Pomilio ===
(Fabbrica Aeroplani Ing. O. Pomilio)

- Pomilio PC
- Pomilio PD
- Pomilio PE
- Pomilio Gamma

=== Poncelet ===
(Paul Poncelet)

- Poncelet Castar - 1923 motorised glider
- Poncelet Vivette
- Poncelet Salmson 40HP

=== Ponche et Primard ===
(Charles Ponche et Maurice Primard)

- Ponche et Primard Tubavion

=== Ponnier ===
(Avions Ponnier - Louis Alfred Ponnier)

- Ponnier 1913 racing monoplane
- Ponnier touring monoplane
- Ponnier 2-seat monoplane
- Ponnier biplane
- Ponnier armoured reconnaissance aircraft (D.8?)
- Ponnier 1916 pusher biplane
- Ponnier D.III (160hp Gnome racer)
- Ponnier D.8
- Ponnier L.1
- Ponnier M.1
- Ponnier M.2
- Ponnier P.I

=== Pontius ===
(John Pontius)

- Pontius 1953 Monoplane
- Pontius Model II

=== Pop's Props ===
(Cooksville, IL)

- Pop's Props Cloudster
- Pop's Props Pinocchio
- Pop's Props Zing

=== Pope ===
(Leon Pope, Plymouth, MI)

- Pope Thunderbird P-2

=== Popejoy ===
(Edward Popejoy, Browns Valley, CA)

- Popejoy 1980 Monoplane

=== Popov ===
(C.B. Popov)

- Popov Baikal-2

=== Porokhovshchikov ===
(Aleksandr Aleksandrovich Porokhovshchikov)

- Porokhovshchikov No.1
- Porokhovshchikov No.2 Bi-kok
- Porokhovshchikov P-IV
- Porokhovshchikov P-IVbis
- Porokhovshchikov P-IV 2bis
- Porokhovshchikov P-V
- Porokhovshchikov No.1
- Porokhovshchikov P-VI

=== Port Victoria ===
- Port Victoria P.V.2
- Port Victoria P.V.4
- Port Victoria P.V.5
- Port Victoria P.V.5bis
- Port Victoria P.V.7
- Port Victoria P.V.8
- Port Victoria P.V.9
- Port Victoria Grain Griffin

=== Porterfield ===
(Porterfield Aircraft Corp, 1328 Locust St, Kansas City, MO)

- Porterfield 35-70 Flyabout
- Porterfield 35-V
- Porterfield 35-W
- Porterfield 75-C
- Porterfield 90
- Porterfield CP-40 Zephyr
- Porterfield CP-50 Collegiate
- Porterfield CP-65 Collegiate
- Porterfield FP-50 Collegiate
- Porterfield FP-60 Collegiate
- Porterfield FP-65 Collegiate
- Porterfield LP-50 Collegiate
- Porterfield LP-55 Collegiate
- Porterfield LP-65 Collegiate
- Porterfield-Turner PT-25
- Porterfield 145

=== Portsmouth Aviation ===
- Portsmouth Aerocar

=== Posadas ===
(J Zenon Posadas Jr, San Francisco, CA)

- Posadas 1908 Biplane

=== Pöschel ===
(Pöschel Aircraft GmbH)

- Pöschel P-300 Equator

=== Post & Neudorf / Post, Org & Neudorf / Post, Org, Neudorf / Post Tooma & Org ===
See:ÕGL

=== Potez ===
Data from:

- Potez IV
- Potez VII
- Potez VIII
- Potez VIIIA
- Potez VIIIH
- Potez VIIIR
- Potez IX
- Potez X
- Potez XI
- Potez XII
- Potez XV
- Potez XVII
- Potez XVIII
- Potez XIX
- Potez XXII
- Potez 23
- Potez 24
- Potez 25
- Potez 26
- Potez 27
- Potez 28
- Potez 29
- Potez 31
- Potez 32
- Potez 33
- Potez 34
- Potez 35
- Potez 36
- Potez 37
- Potez 38
- Potez 39
- Potez 390
- Potez 391
- Potez 392
- Potez 393
- Potez 40
- Potez 400
- Potez 42
- Potez 43
- Potez 430
- Potez 431
- Potez 432
- Potez 434
- Potez 435
- Potez 437
- Potez 438
- Potez 439
- Potez 450
- Potez 452
- Potez 453
- Potez 49
- Potez 50
- Potez 501
- Potez 506
- Potez 53
- Potez 532
- Potez 533
- Potez 54
- Potez 540
- Potez 541
- Potez 542
- Potez 543
- Potez 56E
- Potez 560
- Potez 566
- Potez 567
- Potez 568
- Potez 58
- Potez 580
- Potez 582
- Potez 584
- Potez 585
- Potez 586
- Potez 60
- Potez 62
- Potez 621
- Potez 630
- Potez 631
- Potez 633
- Potez 637
- Potez 63-11
- Potez 650
- Potez 660
- Potez 661
- Potez 662
- Potez 670
- Potez 671
- Potez 75
- Potez 220
- Potez 230
- Potez 840
- Potez 841
- Potez 842
- Potez 91
- Potez 94
- Potez CM-173 Super Magister
- Potez CXP1
- Potez HXP1

=== Potez-CAMS ===
- Potez-CAMS 80
- Potez-CAMS 90
- Potez-CAMS 110
- Potez-CAMS 120
- Potez-CAMS 140
- Potez-CAMS 141
- Potez-CAMS 160
- Potez-CAMS 161

=== Potez-Heinkel ===
- Potez-Heinkel CM.191

=== Pottier ===
- Pottier P.30 Petrel
- Pottier P.40
- Pottier P.50 Bouvereuil
- Pottier P.60 Minacro
- Pottier P.70
- Pottier P.80
- Pottier P.100
- Pottier P.105TS
- Pottier P.110TS
- Pottier P.130 Coccinelle
- Pottier P.170S
- Pottier P.180S
- Pottier P.210S Coati
- Pottier P.220S Koala
- Pottier P.230S Panda
- Pottier P.240S Saiga
- Pottier P.250S Xerus
- Pottier P.270S Amster
- Pottier P.320
- Jacquet-Pottier JP-20-90 Impala

=== Potts ===
(John Potts, Winchester, OH)

- Potts 1910 Biplane Helicopter

=== Potts ===
(Potts Bros, Dodge City, KS)

- Potts PB-1

=== Poullin ===
(Jean Poullin)

- Poullin J.5A
- Poullin J.5B
- Poullin JP.20 Globe Trotter
- Poullin JP.30

=== Powell ===
(Prof C H Powell, et al., University of Detroit, MI)

- Powell PH Racer

=== Powell ===
(John C Powell, Middletown, RI)

- Powell P-70 Acey Deucy

=== Powers ===
(George W Powers, Des Moines, IA)

- Powers 1927 Biplane

=== Powers-Bashforth ===
(Powers-Bashforth Aircraft Corp (Pres: Harry Powers), Arlington, WA)

- Powers-Bashforth Mini Master 2+2 MM-100

=== Pownall ===
(Ivan E Pownall, Grand Rapids MI)

- Pownall EK

=== Powrachute ===
- Airwolf
- Pegasus
- Sky Rascal

=== Praga ===
(Českomoravska-Kolsen-Danek)

- Praga E-I
- Praga E-36
- Praga E-39
- Praga E-40
- Praga E-41
- Praga E-44
- Praga E-45
- Praga E-51
- Praga E-55
- Praga E-114 Air Baby
- Praga E-115
- Praga E-117
- Praga E-141
- Praga E-210
- Praga E-211
- Praga E-212
- Praga E-214
- Praga E-241
- Praga BH-39
- Praga BH-41
- Praga BH-111
- Praga LC-III
- Praga LC-P-3

=== Pratt ===
(Gordon G Pratt, Tucson, AZ)

- Pratt Snoopy

=== Preceptor ===
- Preceptor N3 Pup
- Preceptor Stinger
- Preceptor STOL King
- Preceptor Super Pup
- Preceptor Ultra Pup

=== Precision Tech ===
- Precision Tech Fergy

=== Prescott ===
(Prescott Aeronautical Corp. Wichita, KS)

- Prescott Pusher

=== Prest ===
((Clarence O) Prest Airplane Supply, Arlington, CA)

- Prest Baby Pursuit

=== Preti ===
(Dr. Ing. Ermenegildo Preti)

- Preti PR.2 Saltofossi (Ditchhopper)
- Preti PM.280 Tartuca

=== Price ===
(Paul Price, Pontiac, IL, 19??: Warren, OH)

- Price Special
- Price PL-2-DM

=== Priesel ===
(Guido Priesel)

- Priesel No.1 aircraft
- Priesel No.2 aircraft
- Priesel No.3 aircraft
- Priesel KEP (KEP - KampfEinsitzer Priesel)

=== Přikryl-Blecha ===
(PÁNOVÉ PŘIKRYL & BLECHA)

- Přikryl-Blecha PB-1
- Přikryl-Blecha PB-4 Racek
- Přikryl-Blecha PB-5 Racek
- Přikryl-Blecha PB-6 Racek

=== Pringle ===
(Frank L Pringle, Everton, MO)

- Pringle 1937 Monoplane

=== Privateer Industries ===
(Florida, United States)

- Privateer Industries Privateer

=== Pro FE ===
- Pro FE D-7 Mini Straton
- Pro FE D-8 Moby Dick
- Pro FE D-8 Straton
- Pro FE D-10 Tukan

=== Pro.Mecc ===
(Pro.Mecc S.r.l., Corigliano d'Otranto, Italy)

- Pro.Mecc Freccia Anemo
- Pro.Mecc Sparviero

=== Pro-Composites ===
- Pro-Composites Personal Cruiser
- Pro-Composites Freedom
- Pro-Composites Vision

=== Procaer ===
(Progetti Costruzioni Aeronaitiche Srl)

- Procaer F.15 Picchio
- Procaer Cobra

=== Procter ===
- Procter Kittiwake
- Procter Petrel

=== Pro-Design ===
(Innsbruck, Austria)

- Pro-Design Accura
- Pro-Design Amiga
- Pro-Design Aquila
- Pro-Design Burst
- Pro-Design Corrado
- Pro-Design Carrier
- Pro-Design Challenger
- Pro-Design Combi-Cut
- Pro-Design Compact
- Pro-Design Companion
- Pro-Design Contest
- Pro-Design Eole
- Pro-Design Cuga
- Pro-Design Effect
- Pro-Design Fly
- Pro-Design High
- Pro-Design Jalpa
- Pro-Design Jazz
- Pro-Design Kestral
- Pro-Design Lamna
- Pro-Design Max
- Pro-Design Monster
- Pro-Design Pro-Feel
- Pro-Design Pro-Ject
- Pro-Design Relax
- Pro-Design Rrow
- Pro-Design Thema
- Pro-Design Thermik
- Pro-Design Thesis
- Pro-Design Titan
- Pro-Design X-Fire

=== Progress ===
(Progress Aero R&D Inc)

- Progress Discovery

=== Progressive Aerodyne ===
- Progressive Aerodyne SeaRey
- Progressive Aerodyne Stingray

=== Prohinsie ===
(Royal Aircraft Factory (Fdr: Charles A Prohinsie), Roosevelt Field, Garden City, NY)

- Prohinsie Sesquiplane

=== Promavia ===
(Promavia SA)

- Promavia F.1300 Jet Squalus
- Promavia ATTA 3000
- Promavia ARA 3600

=== Pro Sport Aviation ===
(Wingate, NC)

- Freebird I
- Freebird II

=== Prostar ===
(Prostar Aircraft Inc, Beeville, TX)

- Prostar PT-2C

=== ProTech ===
(ProTech Aircraft Inc, Houston, TX)

- ProTech PT-2 Sassy

=== Protoplane ===
(Bagnères-de-Bigorre, France)

- Protoplane Ultra

=== Proust & Mas ===
(Christian Proust & Mas)

- Proust-Mas Scorpion
- Proust-Sigur-Lespace Scorpion

=== Prowler ===
(Prowler Aviation Inc, Soquel, CA)

- Prowler Jaguar
- Prowler Morse 364P Prowler

=== Prudden ===
((George H) Prudden Airplane Co, San Diego, CA / Prudden-Whitehead / Atlanta Aircraft Corporation - George H Prudden, Edward Whitehead at Atlanta GA.)

- Prudden 1910 biplane
- Prudden XM-1
- Prudden TM-1
- Solar SE-1 Special
- Prudden-Whitehead monoplane
- Atlanta PW-1
- Atlanta PW-2
- Prudden monoplane

=== Pruett ===
(John D Pruett, Crosby, MO)

- Pruett-Curtiss Pusher

=== PSD Technology Company ===
- PSD-09 ekranoplan

=== PSE ===
(Pacific School of Engineering, Portland, OR)

- PSE Racer

=== PSFA ===
(Prva srpska Fabrika Aeroplana)

- PSFA reconnaissance aircraft

=== Puget ===
(Puget Pacific Planes Inc.)

- Puget Wheelair III

=== Puget-Pacific ===
(Tacoma WA)

- Puget-Pacific Wheelair III-A
- Puget-Pacific Wheelair III-B

=== Pujol-Comabella ===
(Pujol, Comabella y Cía, later Loring, Pujol y Cía)

- Pujol-Comabella España

=== Pulliam ===
(Charles Pulliam, Tulsa, OK)

- Pulliam CS-1

=== Pulsar ===
(Pulsar Aircraft Corp, El Monte, CA)

- Pulsar K150
- Pulsar SP100
- Pulsar Super Cruiser
- Pulsar XP/III

=== Puma Aircraft ===
(BDC Aero Industrie, Lachute, Quebec, Canada)

- BDC Aero Puma

=== Purcell ===
(John D Purcell, Chattanooga, TN)

- Purcell 1908 Biplane

=== Purcell ===
(Sam Purcell, San Rafael and San Francisco, CA)

- Purcell 1913 Twin
- Purcell 1916 Biplane
- Purcell 1917 Cabin

=== Purcell ===
(Russell A Purcell, Rock Island, IL)

- Purcell 1928 Biplane

=== Puritan ===
(Puritan Aircraft Co, Weston, MA)

- Puritan 1939 Monoplane

=== Purvis-Wilson ===
(Goodland Aviation Co (William J Purvis, Charles A Wilson), Goodland, KS)

- Purvis-Wilson 1910 Helicopter

=== Pützer ===
(Alfons Pützer KG)

- Pützer Doppelraab
- Pützer Elster
- Pützer Motorraab
- Pützer SR.57 Bussard - de:Pützer Bussard
- Pützer MS.60
- Pützer MS.75

=== P.W.S. ===
(Podlaska Wytwórnia Samolotów)

- P.W.S.A
- P.W.S.1
- P.W.S.3
- P.W.S.4
- P.W.S.5
- P.W.S.6
- P.W.S.7
- P.W.S.8
- P.W.S.10
- P.W.S.11
- P.W.S.12
- P.W.S.14
- P.W.S.15
- P.W.S.16
- P.W.S.18
- P.W.S.19
- P.W.S.20
- P.W.S.21bis
- P.W.S.22 & P.W.S.23
- P.W.S.24
- P.W.S.26
- P.W.S.33 Wyżeł
- P.W.S.35Ogar
- P.W.S.36
- P.W.S.37
- P.W.S.40
- P.W.S.41
- P.W.S.42 Sokol
- P.W.S.49
- P.W.S.50
- P.W.S.51
- P.W.S.52
- P.W.S.54
- P.W.S.101
- P.W.S.102
- P.W.S.103
- StemalVII
- P.W.S. Sep series
- P.W.S. Ciolkosz bomber project (P.W.S.46?)
- P.W.S. Seaplane

== P.Z.L. ==
(Państwowe Zakłady Lotnicze - State Aviation Works)

=== P.Z.L. (1928-1939) ===
- P.Z.L. P.1
- PZL Ł.2
- P.Z.L.3
- P.Z.L.4
- P.Z.L.5
- P.Z.L. P.6
- P.Z.L. P.7
- P.Z.L. P.8
- P.Z.L. P.9
- P.Z.L. P.11
- P.Z.L.12
- P.Z.L.16
- P.Z.L.18
- P.Z.L.19
- P.Z.L.22
- P.Z.L. P.23 Karaś
- P.Z.L. P.24
- P.Z.L.26
- P.Z.L.27
- P.Z.L. P.37 Łoś
- P.Z.L. P.42 Karaś
- P.Z.L. P.43 Karaś
- P.Z.L. P.38 Wilk
- P.Z.L.44 Wicher
- P.Z.L. P.45 Sokol
- P.Z.L. P.46 Sum
- P.Z.L. P.48 Lampart
- P.Z.L. P.49 Miś
- PZL.50 Jastrząb
- P.Z.L. P.62 (Dabrowski's fighter project)
- P.Z.L.-H

=== PZL-Krosno ===
- PZL Krosno KR-02 Krokodyl
- PZL Krosno KR-03 Puchatek

=== PZL Mielec ===
- CSS-13
- PZL Szpak-4T
- PZL S-1
- PZL S-4 Kania
- PZL TS-8 Bies
- PZL M2
- PZL M3 Pliszka
- PZL M7
- PZL M8 Pelikan
- PZL M4 Tarpan
- PZL An-2
- PZL Lim-1
- PZL Lim-2
- PZL Lim-5
- PZL Lim-6
- PZL TS-11 Iskra
- PZL TS-16 Grot
- PZL M12
- PZL M19
- PZL M14
- PZL M15 Belphegor
- PZL M16
- PZL M18 Dromader
- PZL M17
- PZL M20 Mewa
- PZL M19
- PZL M21 Dromader Mini
- PZL M24 Dromader Super
- PZL M25 Dromader Micro
- PZL M26 Iskierka
- PZL An-28
- PZL M28 Skytruck
- PZL M30
- PZL M32
- PZL M34
- PZL I-22 Iryda
- PZL S-70i Blackhawk

=== P.Z.L. Warszawa-Okęcie ===
(CSS -> WSK-Okęcie -> PZL "Warszawa-Okęcie" -> EADS PZL "Warszawa-Okęcie")

- PZL-101 Gawron
- PZL-102 Kos
- PZL-104 Wilga
- PZL-105 Flaming
- PZL-106 Kruk
- PZL-110 Koliber
- PZL-111 Koliber
- PZL-112 Koliber Junior
- PZL-112 Junior
- PZL-126 Mrówka
- PZL-130 Orlik
- PZL-230 Skorpion
- PZL TS-7 Chwat (TS - Tadeusza Sołtyka)
- PZL TS-8 Bies (TS - Tadeusza Sołtyka)
- PZL TS-9 Junak 3 (TS - Tadeusza Sołtyka)
- PZL TS-11 Iskra (TS - Tadeusza Sołtyka)
- PZL TS-15 Fregata (TS - Tadeusza Sołtyka)
- PZL TS-16 Grot (TS - Tadeusza Sołtyka)
- PZL TS-17 Pelikan (TS - Tadeusza Sołtyka)

=== PZL-Świdnik ===
- PZL-Swidnik BZ-1 Gil
- PZL-Swidnik BZ-4 Zuk
- PZL-Swidnik JK-1 Trzmiel
- PZL-Swidnik Kania
- PZL-Swidnik Mi-2
- PZL-Swidnik SM-1
- PZL-Swidnik SM-2
- PZL-Swidnik SM-4 Łątka
- PZL-Swidnik SW-4 Puszczyk
- PZL-Swidnik W-3 Sokół

=== SZD/P.Z.L.-Bielsko ===
- (Państwowe Zakłady Lotnicze - State Aviation Works)
- (Szybowcowym Zakladzie Doświadczalnym - gliding experimental department)
- SZD-45 Ogar (Bloodhound)
- PZL S-1 (S - Eugeniusz Stanikiewicz)
- PZL S-2 (S - Eugeniusz Stanikiewicz)
- PZL S-3 Kania (S - Eugeniusz Stanikiewicz)
- PZL S-4 Kania (S - Eugeniusz Stanikiewicz)

=== W.S.K. PZL Mielec ===
(Wytwórnia Sprzętu Komunikacyjnego - Communication Equipment Factory).

- PZL-Mielec M-1
- PZL-Mielec M-2
- PZL-Mielec M-3 Pliszka
- PZL-Mielec M-4 Tarpan
- PZL-Mielec M-15 Belphegor
- PZL-Mielec M-17
- PZL-Mielec M-18 Dromader
- PZL-Mielec M-20 Mewa
- PZL-Mielec M-21 Dromader Mini
- PZL-Mielec M-24 Dromader Super
- PZL-Mielec M-25 Dromader Mikro
- PZL-Mielec M26 Iskierka
- PZL-Mielec M28
- PZL MD-12
- PZL-Mielec Lala-1
- PZL-Mielec Lim-1
- PZL-Mielec Lim-2
- PZL-Mielec Lim-5
- PZL-Mielec Lim-6
- PZL-Mielec I-22 Iryda
- PZL-Mielec M93 Iryda
- PZL-Mielec M96 Iryda
- PZL M-1
- PZL M-5
- PZL M-7
- PZL M-9 Ziemowit
- PZL M-10
- PZL M-11
- PZL M-12
- PZL M-13
- PZL M-14
- PZL M-16 STN
- PZL M-19
- PZL M-32
- PZL M-34
- PZL M-95
- PZL M-97
- PZL M-99 Orkan
