= Pitts Special (disambiguation) =

Pitts Special may refer to:

- Pitts Special (aerobatic biplane)
- Pitts Special (monoplane)
- Pitts Special (roller coaster)
