= PA44 =

PA44 may refer to:

- Pennsylvania Route 44
- Piper PA-44 Seminole, a twin-engine light aircraft
- Pitcairn PA-44, an autogyro
