= TB2 =

TB2 may refer to:

- Baykar Bayraktar TB2, unmanned combat aerial vehicle
- Polikarpov TB-2, Soviet bomber prototype
- .tb2, file suffix; see Tar (computing)#Suffixes for compressed files
- Tubular Bells II, a 1992 album by British musician Mike Oldfield
