= Pottier P.40 =

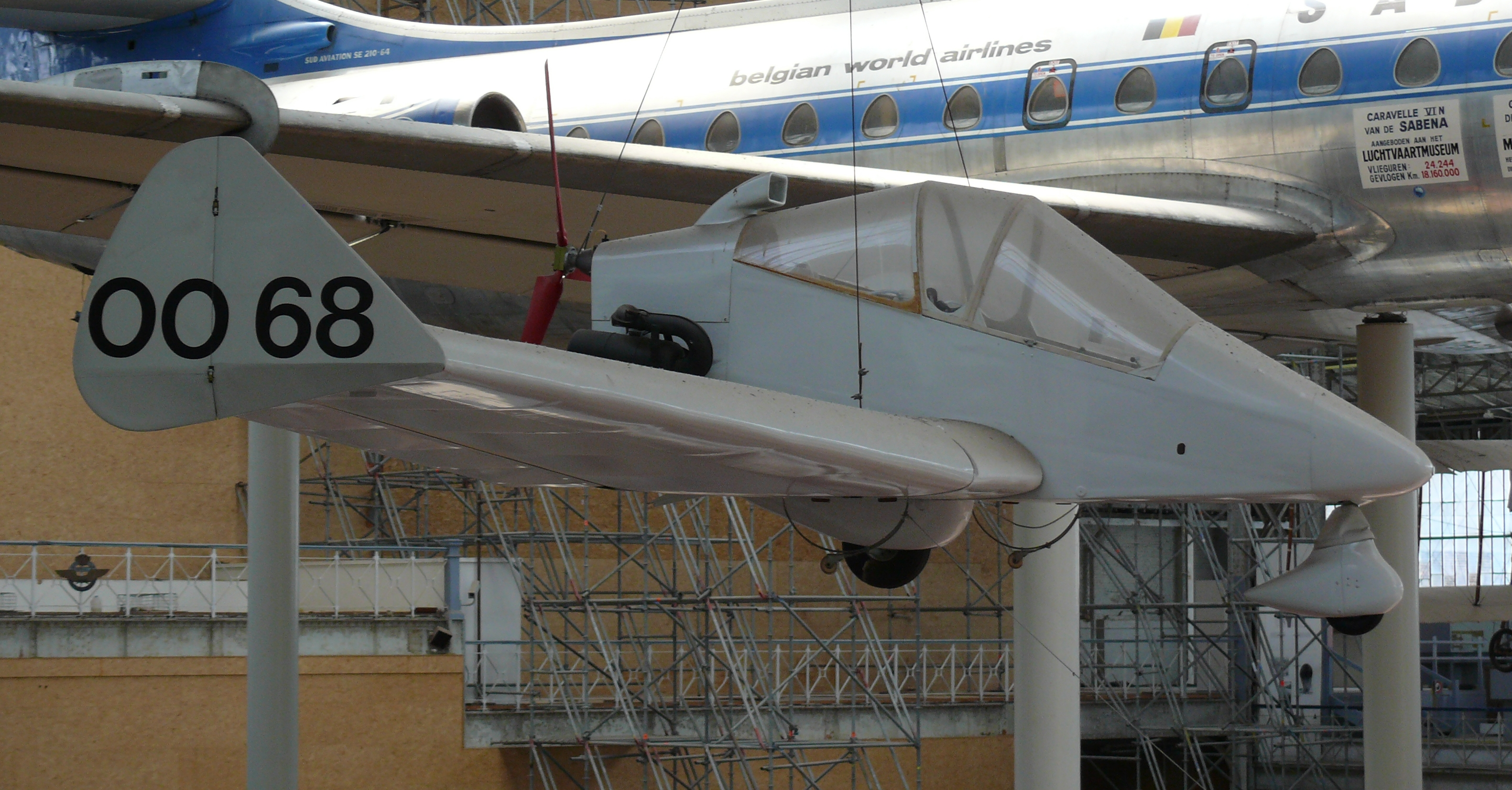
- in the Royal Museum of the Armed Forces and Military History

General information
- Type: Single seat tailless homebuilt sports aircraft
- Designer: Jean Pottier
- Number built: 2

History
- First flight: 1975

The French tailless Pottier P.40 was the first aircraft designed by Jean Pottier. It flew in 1975.

== Design ==
The Pottier P.40 was the first of Jean Pottier's many designs, begun around 1967, though not the first to fly as the P.70 flew in August 1974. Construction of the P.40 by Bela Nogrady was started in 1968 but the first flight was not made until 1975.

The P.40 is a tailless aircraft with a swept, cantilever, low wing. In plan, the wing has a rectangular centre section and straight tapered outer panels with elevons. There are wing tip fins and outward opening rudders which extend a little below the wing.

The short fuselage is flat sided, mostly occupied by a long canopy over the single seat cockpit. The engine, a 19 kW (25 hp) Volkswagen 1.2 litre air-cooled flat-four, is in the rear in pusher configuration. The P.40 has a low, fixed, faired bicycle undercarriage.

== Operational history ==
The first P.40 made only one short flight and was then destroyed. The history of the one surviving example, OO-68, on display in the Belgian Royal Museum of the Armed Forces and Military History in Brussels is obscure. The two machines differed a little, with varying engine cooling and exhaust arrangements, and OO-68 has a three, rather than two, blade propeller.

== Specifications ==
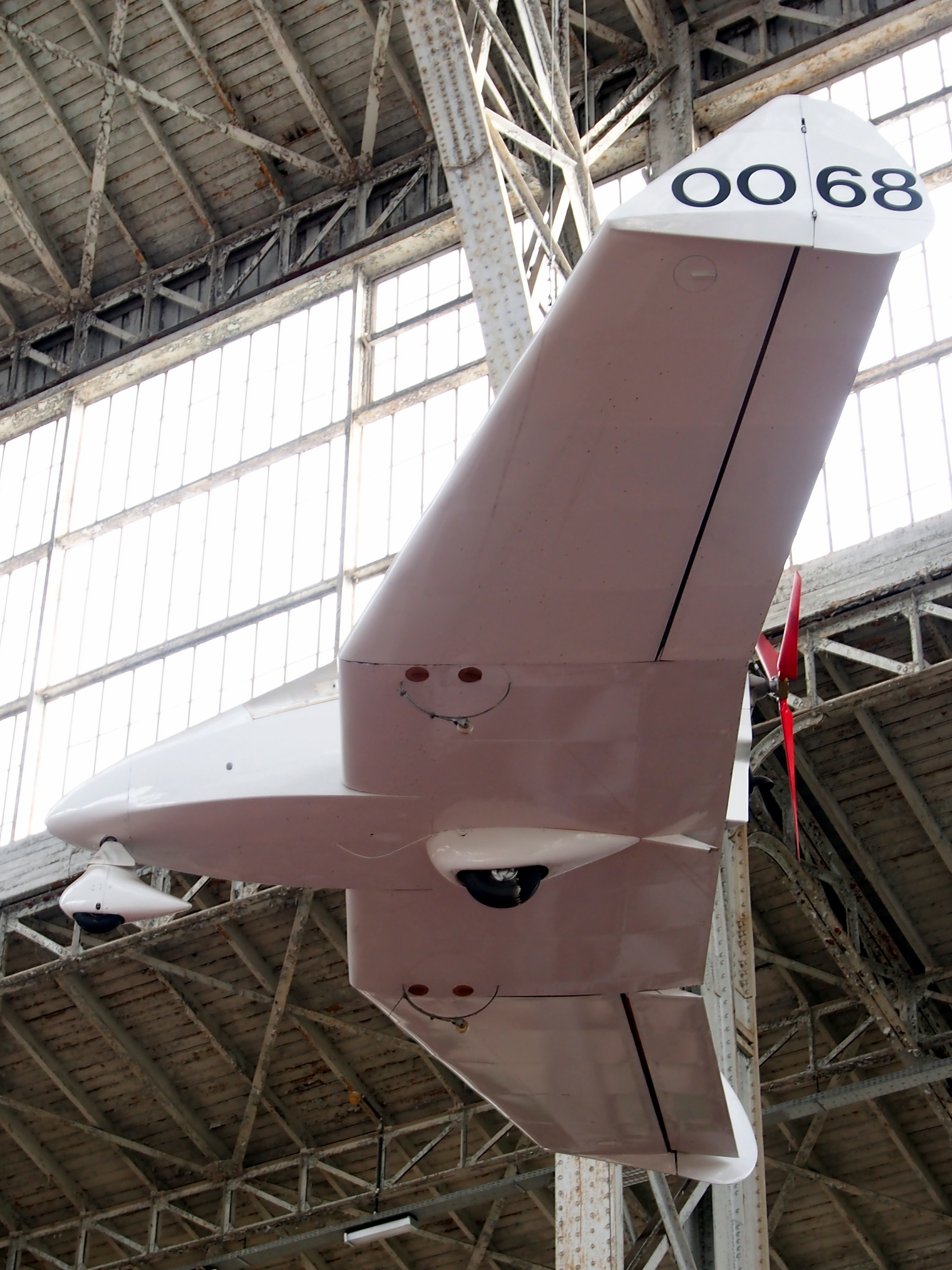
In the Royal Museum of the Armed Forces and Military History

Data from Gaillard (1991) p.150

General characteristics

- Crew: One
- Length: 2.60 m (8 ft 6 in)
- Wingspan: 6 m (19 ft 8 in)
- Height: 1.20 m (3 ft 11 in)
- Wing area: 8 m^{2} (86 sq ft)
- Empty weight: 150 kg (331 lb)
- Max takeoff weight: 270 kg (595 lb)
- Powerplant: 1 × Volkswagen 1.2 litre air-cooled flat-four, 19 kW (25 hp)
- Propellers: 2 (3 on second aircraft)-bladed

Performance

- Maximum speed: 180 km/h (110 mph, 97 kn)
- Cruise speed: 160 km/h (99 mph, 86 kn)
- Range: 600 km (370 mi, 320 nmi)
- Service ceiling: 2,900 m (9,500 ft)
