= Pottier P.80 =

Aircraft

P.80
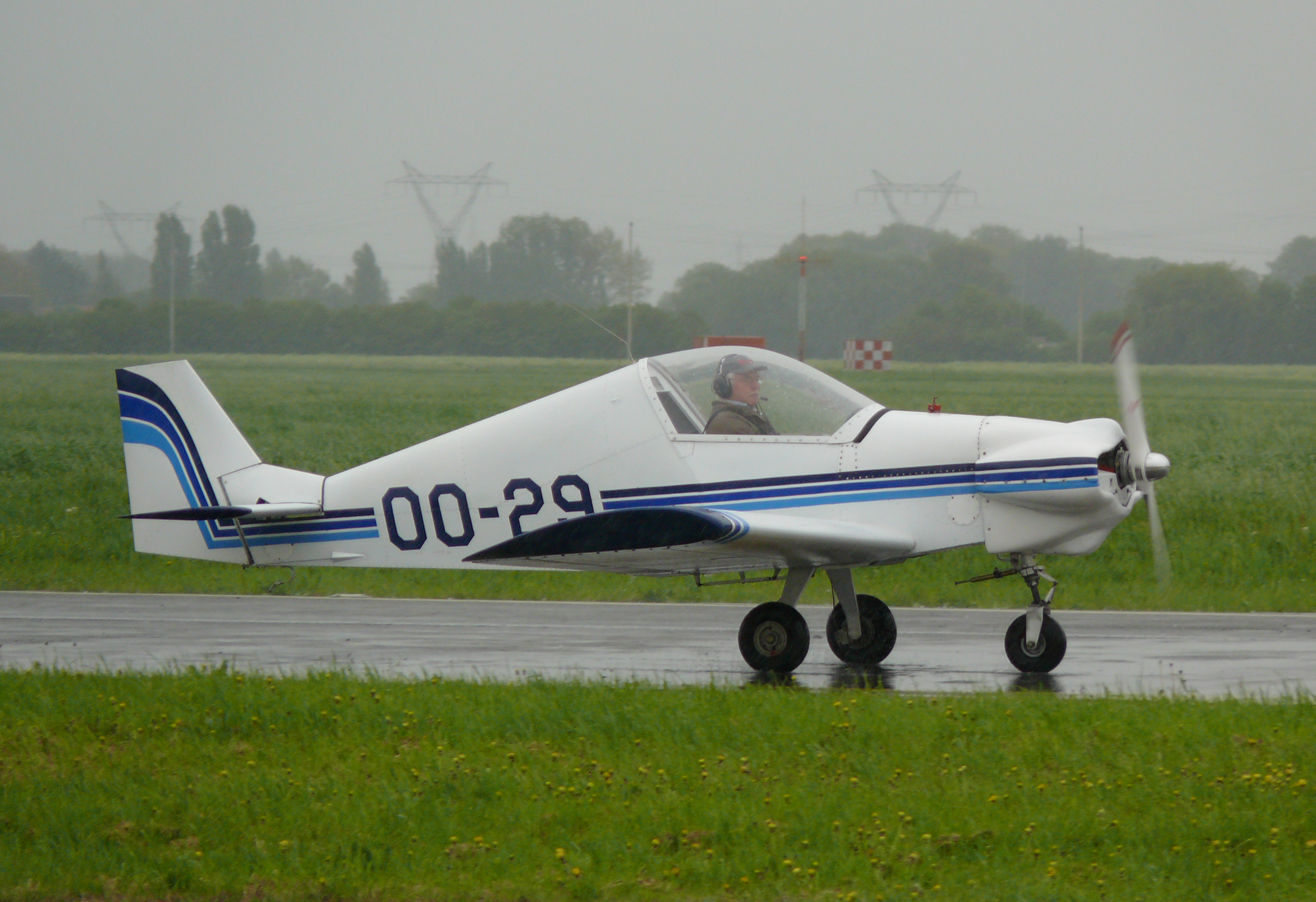

General information
- Type: Sport aircraft
- National origin: France
- Manufacturer: Homebuilt
- Designer: Jean Pottier

The Pottier P.80 is a single-seat, single-engine sport aircraft developed in France in the late 1970s and marketed for homebuilding. Ultimately based on the P.70 design, it features a redesigned wing and cockpit canopy. The P.80 is a low-wing cantilever monoplane of conventional design with an enclosed cockpit. Construction throughout is of metal. The prototype was constructed and unveiled at the 1977 Paris Air Show.

Just as the P.70 had led to the two-seat P.170, Pottier also created a two-seat version of the P.80, but with its seats side-by-side instead of in tandem as those of the P.170 had been. This was designated the P.180, and by 1987, at least 13 examples had flown.

== Variants ==
- P.80S - single-seat version
- P.180S - two-seat version

== Specifications (P.80S) ==
Data from Jane's All the World's Aircraft 1987–88 p. 588–89

General characteristics

- Crew: One pilot
- Length: 5.35 m (17 ft 7 in)
- Wingspan: 6.50 m (21 ft 4 in)
- Wing area: 7.8 m^{2} (84 sq ft)
- Empty weight: 240 kg (529 lb)
- Gross weight: 470 kg (1,036 lb)
- Powerplant: 1 × Volkswagen air-cooled engine , 67 kW (90 hp)

Performance

- Maximum speed: 230 km/h (140 mph, 120 kn)
- Range: 500 km (310 mi, 270 nmi)
- Rate of climb: 1.7 m/s (330 ft/min)
