= Prudden =

Prudden is an English surname.

Notable people with this surname include:

- Bonnie Prudden, American physical fitness pioneer
- Edward Prudden, Canadian politician
- Emily Prudden, American educator
- George H. Prudden, American engineer
- Josh Prudden, Australian footballer
- Peter Prudden, English Puritan
- Theophil Mitchell Prudden, American pathologist
