= Pottier P.50 =

P.50 Bouvreuil

General information
- Type: Racing aircraft
- National origin: France
- Manufacturer: Homebuilt
- Designer: Jean Pottier

History
- First flight: 27 July 1979

The Pottier P.50 Bouvreuil ("Bullfinch") was a single-seat, single-engine racing aircraft developed in France in the late 1970s and marketed for homebuilding. It was a low-wing cantilever monoplane of conventional design with an enclosed cockpit. The undercarriage was of tailwheel configuration, and the P.50 was designed from the outset to offer the builder the alternative of fixed or retractable main units. Construction throughout was of wood, except for the engine cowling and main wheel spats, which were fibreglass mouldings.

== Variants ==
- P.50 - version with fixed undercarriage
- P.50R - version with retractable undercarriage

== Specifications ==
Data from Jane's All the World's Aircraft 1987–88 p. 588

General characteristics

- Crew: One pilot
- Length: 5.65 m (18 ft 7 in)
- Wingspan: 6.20 m (20 ft 4 in)
- Wing area: 7.5 m^{2} (81 sq ft)
- Empty weight: 270 kg (595 lb)
- Gross weight: 400 kg (882 lb)
- Powerplant: 1 × Continental C-90 , 67 kW (90 hp)

Performance

- Maximum speed: 310 km/h (190 mph, 170 kn)
