= Prudden-Whitehead monoplane =

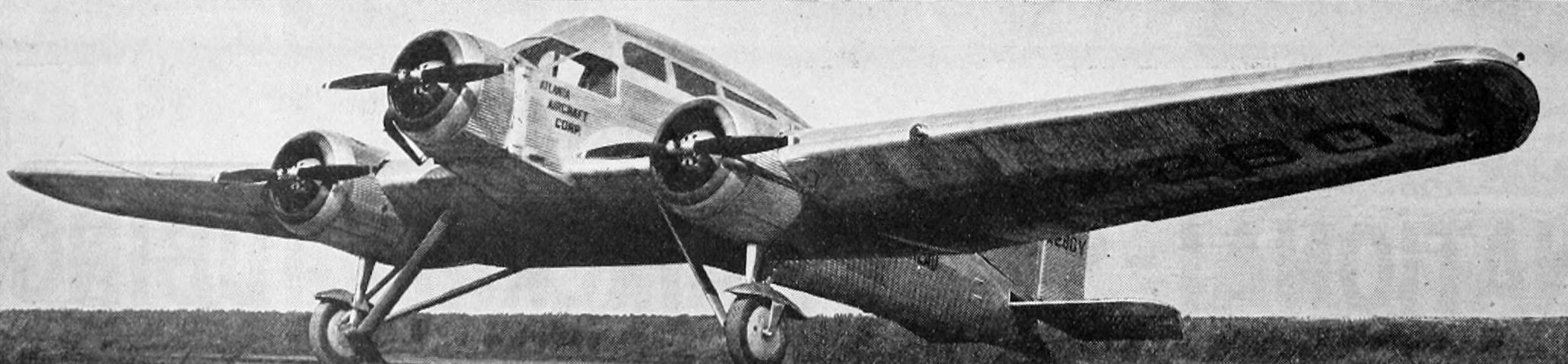

General information
- Type: Ten-seat transport monoplane
- National origin: United States
- Manufacturer: Atlanta Aircraft Corporation
- Designer: George H. Prudden
- Number built: 2

History
- First flight: 1930

The Prudden-Whitehead monoplane (sometimes referred to as the Atlanta PW-1, PW-2 or the Prudden monoplane) is an American three-engined eight-seat commercial transport monoplane. Built by the Atlanta Aircraft Corporation and designed by George H. Prudden, Edward Whitehead was responsible for the sales of the aircraft.

== Design and development ==
The Prudden-Whitehead monoplane is an all-metal low-wing cantilever monoplane with a monocoque fuselage and powered by three 240 hp (179 kW) Wright R-760 piston engines. It has a conventional fixed landing gear with a tailwheel. It has an enclosed passenger cabin for eight to ten passengers and a washroom and toilet. Only two of the trimotors were built.

== Variants ==
PW-1
The first aircraft built registered N366W.
PW-2
The second aircraft built registered N280V.

== Specifications ==
Data from

General characteristics

- Crew: 2
- Capacity: 8 to 10 passengers
- Length: 44 ft 10 in (13.67 m)
- Wingspan: 66 ft 6 in (20.27 m)
- Height: 14 ft 0.88 in (4.29 m)
- Wing area: 662.5 sq ft (61.6 m^{2})
- Empty weight: 5,200 lb (2,359 kg)
- Gross weight: 7,735 lb (3,509 kg)
- Powerplant: 3 × Wright R-760 piston engine , 240 hp (179 kW) each

Performance

- Maximum speed: 145 mph (233 km/h, 126 kn)
- Cruise speed: 124 mph (199 km/h, 108 kn)
- Range: 620 mi (998 km, 540 nmi)
- Endurance: 5 hours 0 minutes
- Service ceiling: 15,000 ft (4,600 m)
- Rate of climb: 1,220 ft/min (76.2 m/s)
