= Prowler Jaguar =

Jaguar

General information
- Type: Homebuilt aircraft pseudo-warbird
- National origin: United States
- Manufacturer: Prowler Aviation
- Designer: George Morse

History
- First flight: 17 March 1985

The Prowler Jaguar is an American pseudo-warbird produced by Prowler Aviation of California for amateur construction. Originally designed and built by George Morse the prototype first flew on 17 March 1985, it is a two-seat low-wing monoplane. The aircraft has a retractable conventional landing gear and the recommended engine is a 350 hp (261 kW) conversion of a Rodeck V8.

== Specifications (production kit) ==
Data from Brassey's World Aircraft & Systems Directory

General characteristics

- Crew: 2
- Length: 21 ft 0 in (6.40 m)
- Wingspan: 25 ft 5 in (7.75 m)
- Empty weight: 1,560 lb (708 kg)
- Gross weight: 2,500 lb (1,134 kg)
- Powerplant: 1 × Rodeck V8 conversion , 350 hp (260 kW)
- Propellers: 3-bladed

Performance

- Maximum speed: 300 mph (480 km/h, 260 kn)
- Cruise speed: 250 mph (400 km/h, 220 kn)
- Stall speed: 60 mph (97 km/h, 52 kn)
- Range: 1,200 mi (1,900 km, 1,000 nmi)
- Rate of climb: 2,500 ft/min (13 m/s)
