= Pilots Right Stuff =

German aircraft manufacturer

- Company type: Privately held company
- Industry: Aerospace
- Founded: circa 2000
- Defunct: circa 2009
- Headquarters: Brannenburg, Germany
- Key people: Hans Bausenwein
- Products: Paragliders
- Parent: Aerosport International

Pilots Right Stuff (often called just PRS) was a German aircraft manufacturer based in Brannenburg and founded by Hans Bausenwein. The company specialized in the design and manufacture of paragliders in the form of ready-to-fly aircraft.

The company was a division of Aerosport International, a company that acted mostly as a paraglider importer, representing manufacturers such as Paratech, Ozone Gliders and Sup'Air.

PRS seems to have been founded about 2000 and gone out of business in 2009. The company's aim was to build gliders for specific applications where market gaps were apparent, not to field a complete line of paragliders. As such the company did not establish a design team, but contracted design assistance as required, in particular from Ozone Gliders.

PRS's first glider was the PRS One, introduced in 2000 and designed with outside assistance. The Peak set new standards for a mountaineering descent glider and was followed by the Pilot One in production.

In 2003 the company was developing an advanced and competition glider design with light handling, to be capable of being flown from unprepared sites.

== Aircraft ==
Summary of aircraft built by PRS:

- PRS One
- PRS Peak
- PRS Pilot One
