= Potez 56 =

French Monoplane built in the 1930's

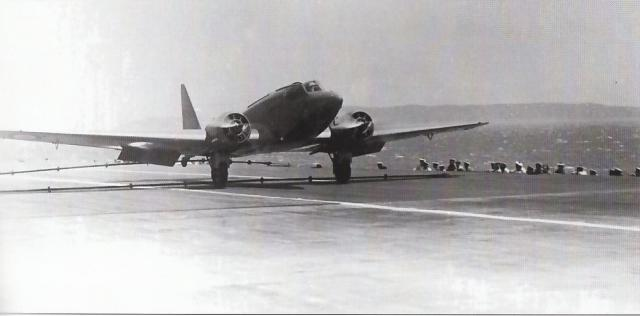

General information
- Type: Eight-seat executive monoplane
- National origin: France
- Manufacturer: Potez
- Designer: Louis Coroller
- Number built: 72

History
- First flight: 1934

The Potez 56 was a 1930s French executive transport monoplane built by Potez and later used as a military crew trainer and liaison aircraft.

== Development ==
Potez began work on a twin-engined light transport aircraft, the Potez 56, in early 1934, with the design team being led by Louis Coroller. The resultant design was a cantilever low-wing monoplane of wooden construction, with plywood covering. It had a single fin and rudder and was powered by two 185 hp (138 kW) Potez 9Ab nine-cylinder radial engines, and was fitted with a retractable conventional landing gear. A single pilot sat in an enclosed cockpit, with a separate cabin aft accommodating six passengers. Baggage could be carried in a compartment in the aircraft's nose.

Design of the new type was rapid, with construction of a prototype beginning in April 1934, and the prototype making its first flight on 18 June 1934. Testing led to the tail of the aircraft being fitted with dihedral to improve longitudinal stability. The Potez received its airworthiness certificate on 3 May 1935.

The military soon became interested in the aircraft and ordered versions for twin-engined training, liaison duties and as a target tug. The most unusual version was the Potez 565, modified with an arrester hook for use on the aircraft carrier Béarn, onto which it made an arrested landing, and took off again in March 1936.

== Operational history ==
The prototype entered service with Potez's own airline, Potez Aéro Service, on the Bordeaux–Bastia route on 15 May 1935, with the airline receiving three more production aircraft before it was disbanded in the wake of the nationalisation of the French aviation industry in August 1936. Other airline users included Régie Air Afrique, which operated two Potez 560s on services in North Africa. The Romanian airline SARTA received five Potez 560s and one 561, these aircraft passing to LARES when SARTA merged with LARES in 1937, with these aircraft being supplemented by a further eight 561s. These aircraft were requisitioned by the Romanian Air Force in 1941 and in 1943, some were used for training of pilots in flying twin-engined aircraft. One Potez 560 was used as an executive aircraft by the Romanian president of the Fédération Aéronautique Internationale, Prince Bibescu. Six Potez 560s were used by the Chilean airline LAN Chile, remaining in use until 1944.

Several Potez 560s or 561s were also used during the Spanish Civil War, operated on the side of the Republicans by a series of shadowy airlines of unknown provenance, such as Air Pyrénées, Société Française de Transports Aériens (SFTA) and Air Languedoc. They operated with both French or Spanish aircraft registrations, with duties including liaison operations on behalf of the Basque Government.

Several versions of the Potez 56 were also used by the French military. Three Potez 560s were delivered to French Naval Aviation and used as transports for government ministers. The first specialised military version of the Potez 56 was the Potez 565 (also known as the Potez 56E), designed for experimental operations from aircraft carriers. The single example was first flown in January 1936, and landed on, and then took off from, the carrier Béarn on 22 September 1936, the first time a twin engined aircraft had successfully landed on an aircraft carrier. After completing these trials, the Potez 565 was used as a liaison aircraft by the French Navy. The Potez 565 carried out a second series of carrier trials, together with examples of the Loire-Nieuport LN.40 and the Vought V-156-F dive bombers, aboard Béarn in July 1939. It was withdrawn from use after cracks were found in its fuselage in May 1940, and was scrapped in June that year. In September 1937, the French Navy ordered 20 examples of a new version, the Potez 567, for use as a fast liaison aircraft and target tug, with deliveries starting in October 1939 and continuing until January 1940. Thirteen 567s survived the fall of France to be used by the Vichy Navy, with several being passed to Italy after the German occupation of Southern France in November 1942, while at least one aircraft based in Africa survived the Anglo-American landings in French North West Africa to be used by Free French forces, remaining in use until at least October 1943.

== Variants ==
Potez 56
Prototype, one built.
Potez 56E
A single prototype of a 3-seat shipboard reconnaissance aircraft, powered by 2x 138 kW (185 hp) Potez 9Ab radial engines
Potez 56-T.3
3-seat trainer, powered by 2x 180 kW (240 hp) Potez 9E radial engines. Alternative designation of the Potez 566
Potez 560
Civil production aircraft, 18 built.
Potez 561
Modified version with Ratier propellers and improved performance, 11 built.
Potez 565
One aircraft with streamlined fuselage and fitted with arrester hook for aircraft carrier use.
Potez 566
Three-seat military version for observation, pilot and bombing training duties. Fitted with a manual-operated dorsal turret and a ventral nacelle for an observer, three built. Also known as the Potez 56-T.3.
Potez 567
Naval version for use as a liaison aircraft and target tug, powered 2x 180 kW (240 hp) Potez 9Eo radial engines. 20 built.
Potez 568
French Air Force crew-training version, 26 built, also known as the Potez 568 P.3.

== Operators ==
Chile

- LAN Chile

France

- French Air Force
- French Navy
- Potez Aéro Service
- Régie Air Afrique

Romania

- LARES (Liniile Aeriene Române Exploatate de Stat)
- SARTA (Societatea Anonimă Română de Transporturi Aeriene

Spain

- Spanish Republican Air Force, from LAPE

== Specifications (560) ==
Data from

General characteristics

- Crew: 2
- Capacity: 6 passengers
- Length: 11.84 m (38 ft 10.25 in)
- Wingspan: 16 m (52 ft 6 in)
- Height: 4.6 m (15 ft 1.25 in)
- Wing area: 33 m^{2} (355.22 sq ft)
- Empty weight: 1,910 kg (4,211 lb)
- Gross weight: 2,980 kg (6,570 lb)
- Powerplant: 2 × Potez 9Ab radial piston , 138 kW (185 hp) each

Performance

- Maximum speed: 270 km/h (168 mph, 146 kn)
- Range: 650 km (404 mi, 351 nmi)
- Service ceiling: 6,000 m (19,685 ft)

== See also ==
Aircraft of comparable role, configuration, and era

- Airspeed Envoy
- Caudron C.440 Goéland

Related lists

- List of Interwar military aircraft
- List of aircraft of World War II
