= Pivot-Koechlin monoplane =

1910s French aircraft

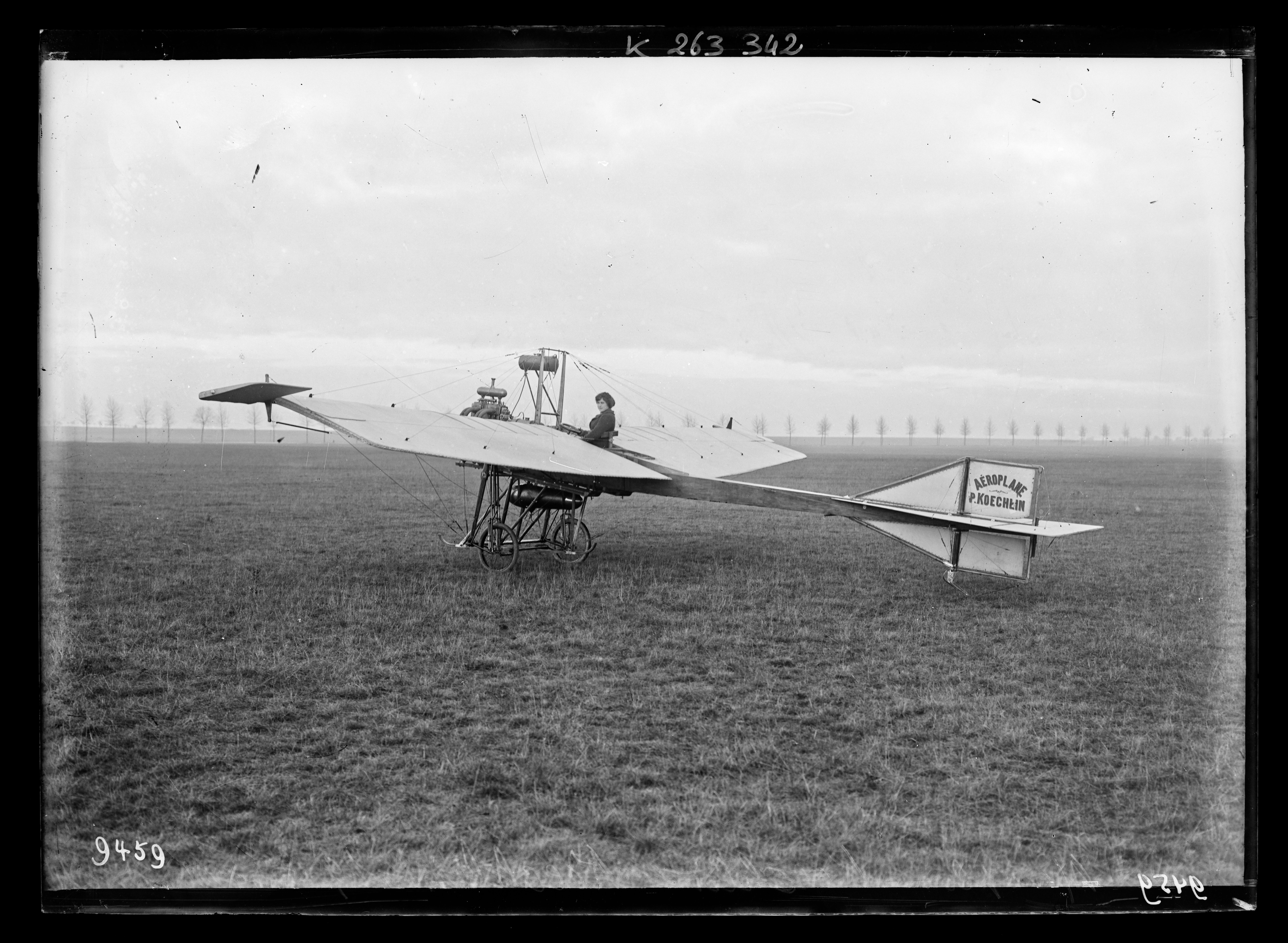

General information
- Type: Observation aircraft
- National origin: France
- Manufacturer: Pivot and Paul Koechlin
- Number built: 1

History
- First flight: 1911

The Pivot-Koechlin monoplane was a French experimental monoplane aircraft built in the early 1910s.

== Specifications ==
Data from Aviafrance: Pivot-Koechlin monoplane, French Aeroplanes before the Great War

General characteristics

- Crew: 3
- Length: 7.80 m (25 ft 7 in)
- Wingspan: 10.00 m (32 ft 10 in)
- Wing area: 17.00 m^{2} (183.0 sq ft)
- Powerplant: 1 × Gnome 7 Omega 7-cylinder air-cooled rotary piston engine, 37 kW (50 hp)
- Propellers: 2-bladed fixed-pitch propeller

Performance

- Maximum speed: 110 km/h (68 mph, 59 kn)
