= Pope Thunderbird P-2 =

General information
- Type: Homebuilt aircraft
- National origin: United States
- Designer: Leon Pope

The Pope Thunderbird is an American homebuilt biplane designed by Leon Pope.

== Design and development ==
The Pope Thunderbird P-2 is a single engine, conventional landing gear-equipped, open cockpit biplane. The aircraft was designed by Leon Pope of Plymouth, Michigan and made its maiden flight on June 18, 1959.

== Specifications ==
Data from Jane's All The World's Aircraft 1961–62

General characteristics

- Crew: 1
- Length: 15 ft 0 in (4.57 m)
- Wingspan: 18 ft 3 in (5.56 m)
- Height: 5 ft 9 in (1.75 m)
- Wing area: 120 sq ft (11 m^{2})
- Aspect ratio: 5.7:1
- Airfoil: S-1A
- Empty weight: 800 lb (363 kg)
- Gross weight: 1,080 lb (490 kg)
- Powerplant: 1 × Lycoming O-235-C four-cylinder horizontally opposed piston aircraft engine, 100 hp (75 kW)

Performance

- Maximum speed: 135 mph (217 km/h, 117 kn)
- Cruise speed: 115 mph (185 km/h, 100 kn)
- Stall speed: 55 mph (89 km/h, 48 kn)3 1/2 h
- Rate of climb: 1,000 ft/min (5.1 m/s)
