= Pottier P.100 =

P.100, P.110, P.105

General information
- Type: Utility aircraft
- National origin: France
- Manufacturer: Homebuilt
- Designer: Jean Pottier

History
- First flight: 16 October 1980

The Pottier P.100 and its derivatives were a family of single-engine aircraft developed in France in the 1970s and 80s. They were high-wing cantilever monoplanes of conventional design with enclosed cabins and fixed tricycle undercarriage. The P.100 had two seats, arranged side-by-side, while the P.110 had its fuselage stretched by 50 cm (20 in) to include a third seat and a greater wingspan. The P.105 was a hybrid of the two designs, featuring the shorter, two-seat fuselage of the P.100 and the longer-span wings of the P.110.

== Variants ==
- P.100TS - two-seat version
- P.110TS - three-seat version
- P.105TS - version with fuselage of P.100 and wings of P.110

== Specifications (P.100) ==
Data from Jane's All the World's Aircraft 1987–88 p. 588

General characteristics

- Crew: One pilot
- Capacity: 1 passenger
- Length: 6.50 m (21 ft 4 in)
- Wingspan: 6.85 m (22 ft 5 in)
- Wing area: 9.3 m^{2} (100 sq ft)
- Empty weight: 435 kg (959 lb)
- Gross weight: 680 kg (1,500 lb)
- Powerplant: 1 × Continental O-200 , 75 kW (100 hp)

Performance

- Maximum speed: 250 km/h (160 mph, 140 kn)
- Range: 650 km (400 mi, 350 nmi)
- Rate of climb: 6.2 m/s (1,220 ft/min)
