= Koshiki-2 Experimental Fighter =

Japanese fighter prototype

Koshiki-2
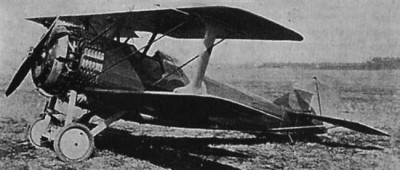

General information
- Type: Fighter aircraft
- National origin: Japan
- Manufacturer: Department of Research of the Army Tokorozawa Aviation School
- Status: Prototype
- Number built: 2

History
- First flight: 1922

The Koshiki-2 Experimental Fighter was a prototype fighter aircraft designed by the Tokorozawa Aviation School of the Imperial Japanese Army. It was a single-engined, single-seat biplane and was the first single-seat fighter of wholly Japanese design and construction. Two were built and flown in 1922 and 1923, but no further production followed.

== Design and development ==
The Provisional Military Balloon Research Association (PMBRA) (Japanese:Rinji Gunyo Seiki Kikyu Kenkyu Kai) was established at Tokorozawa, Saitama on 30 July 1909 as a joint venture by the Imperial Japanese Army and the Imperial Japanese Navy to develop both lighter-than-air and fixed wing aircraft. It soon became dominated by the Army and developed a series of experimental aircraft as well as coordinating aviation research and aircraft procurement for the Army. The PMBRA was shut down in April 1919, with the Army Aviation School established at the same site. The aircraft research and design capability of the PMBRA was taken over by the Department of Research at the Army Aviation School.

In 1920, the Department of Research started the design of a new single-seat fighter, the Koshiki-2 (School Type 2, as it was designed at the Army Aviation School). The design was a single-engined tractor configuration biplane of wood and fabric construction and of similar design to the French SPAD XIII fighter. It had single-bay wings with single I-shape interplane struts and had an all-moving horizontal tailplane. It was powered by a single 260 horsepower (190 kW) Salmson 9Z water-cooled radial engine.

The first example was completed and flown in 1922. It was the first single-seat fighter of wholly Japanese design and construction. Its performance was good, reaching a speed of 206 kilometres per hour (128 mph), but, although handling was generally acceptable, the aircraft was found to have poor horizontal stability at low speeds. It was wrecked in a landing accident during the aircraft's fourth flight, when it overshot the landing ground. A second prototype was completed in 1923, but it was found to be still unstable at low speeds, and no further development or construction took place.

== Specifications ==
Data from The Complete Book of Fighters

General characteristics

- Crew: 1
- Length: 6.60 m (21 ft 8 in)
- Wingspan: 10.00 m (32 ft 10 in)
- Height: 2.40 m (7 ft 10 in)
- Wing area: 20.00 m^{2} (215.3 sq ft)
- Empty weight: 650 kg (1,433 lb)
- Gross weight: 950 kg (2,094 lb)
- Powerplant: 1 × Salmson 9Z 9-cylinder water cooled radial engine, 190 kW (260 hp)

Performance

- Maximum speed: 206 km/h (128 mph, 111 kn) at 3,000 m (9,840 ft)
- Endurance: 2 hours
- Service ceiling: 9,200 m (30,200 ft)
- Time to altitude: 9 minutes to 2,000 m (6,560 ft)

Armament

- Guns: 2 × 7.7 mm machine guns
