= Polikarpov NB =

General information
- Type: Medium bomber
- National origin: Soviet Union
- Manufacturer: Polikarpov
- Status: Cancelled
- Number built: 1

History
- First flight: 23 May 1944

The Polikarpov NB (Nochnoi Bombardirovshchik—Night Bomber) was a Soviet twin-engined bomber designed during World War II. Only a single prototype had been built before the program was terminated upon the death of Nikolai Nikolaevich Polikarpov, the head of the aircraft's design bureau, in 1944.

== Development ==
The origins of the NB program are obscure, but design work began during the winter of 1941–42 with the OKB designation of aircraft T. The NB was a high-winged, twin-engined, twin tail monoplane of mixed construction. The fuselage was built of 'shpon', molded birch plywood, 4–5 mm (0.16–0.20 in) thick and was reinforced with a welded steel tube framework and a network of bracing wires in the midsection around the aperture for the wing and the capacious bomb bay. The single-spar wing was built from a mix of steel and duralumin. The center section had a duralumin skin, but the outer panels were skinned in 'shpon'. The duralumin slotted flaps were electrically powered and ran the length of the wing center section, divided by the engine nacelles. Automatic leading edge slats were mounted on the outer panels. All control surfaces were built from wood and covered in fabric. The tailplane had 7° dihedral with twin fins. It had a duralumin structure and was covered in 'shpon'. The main gears of the conventional undercarriage retracted aft into the rear of the engine nacelles and the tail wheel retracted into the rear fuselage. Six protected fuel tanks were in the wing center section, plus four more in the outer wings. They had a total capacity of 2,760 kg (6,085 lb) (including oil). Two 1,379 kW (1,849 hp) air-cooled Shvetsov ASh-82 radial engines were slung underneath the wings. Alternative engines considered were the Mikulin AM-39 V-12 and the Shvetsov M-71 radial, but development problems with both engines dropped them from consideration.

The bombardier was given an extensively glazed position in the nose which also had a fixed 12.7 mm (0.50 in) Berezin UB machine gun for which the pilot had a reflector sight. The dorsal gunner had a UBT machine gun in a turret while the ventral gunner fired another UB through a hatch. The bomb bay could carry up to 2,000 kg (4,400 lb) internally and an additional 3,000 kg (6,600 lb) of bombs could be carried underneath the wings.

The NB made its first flight on 23 May 1944 and completed its manufacturer's flight tests in August. Its performance promised to be outstanding, but Polikarpov's death a month earlier caused his design bureau to be shut down and all his projects were terminated.

== Specifications ==
Data from Gunston, The Osprey Encyclopedia of Russian Aircraft 1875–1995

General characteristics

- Crew: 5
- Length: 15.29 m (50 ft 2 in)
- Wingspan: 21.52 m (70 ft 7 in)
- Wing area: 58.1 m^{2} (625 sq ft)
- Airfoil: NACA-230
- Empty weight: 8,843 kg (19,495 lb)
- Gross weight: 13,800 kg (30,424 lb)
- Fuel capacity: 2,760 kg (6,085 lb) (including oil)
- Powerplant: 2 × Shvetsov ASh-82FNV 14-cylinder radial engines, 1,379 kW (1,849 hp) each
- Propellers: 3-bladed

Performance

- Maximum speed: 510 km/h (320 mph, 280 kn) at 5,000 m (16,400 m)
- Range: 3,030 km (1,880 mi, 1,640 nmi) with 3,000 kg (6,614 lb) of bombs
- Service ceiling: 6,150 m (20,180 ft)
- Time to altitude: 12 minutes to 5,000 metres (16,404 ft)

Armament

- Guns: 3x 12.7 mm Berezin UB machine guns
- Bombs: up to 5,000 kilograms (11,023 lb)
