= Pilatus PC-10 =

PC-10

General information
- Type: light transport
- National origin: Switzerland
- Manufacturer: Pilatus Aircraft
- Number built: 0

History
- First flight: non

The Pilatus PC-10 was the common name of different designs for a twin-engine aircraft manufacturer Pilatus Aircraft, but none of them reached the production stage.

== Turbopropversion PC-8D / PC-10 Twin Porter ==
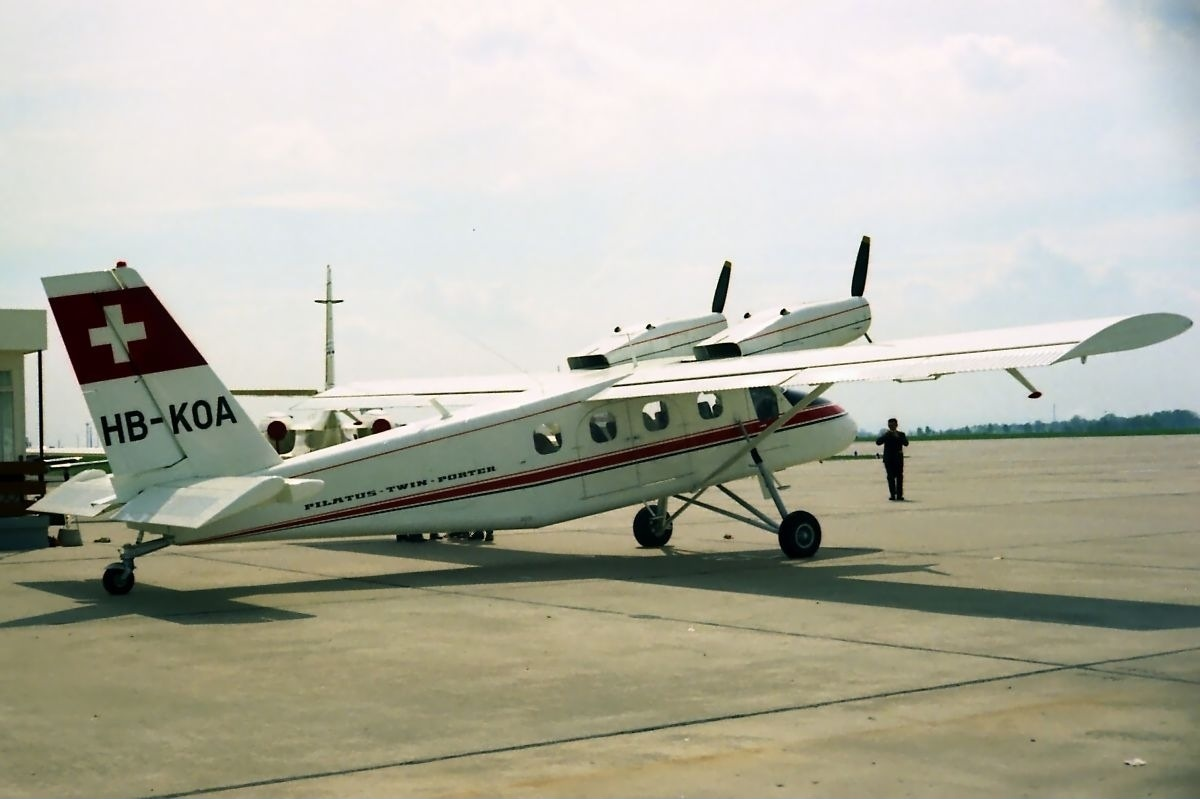
Pilatus PC-8D

The first draft was basically an unchanged Pilatus PC-8D Twin Porter, the place of the piston engines would have been equipped with turboprop.

== PC-10 Mini Twin ==
Under the name PC-10 MiniTwin a machine was designed for 11 people, on the left rear side of the hull with a cargo door with integrated passenger door. The aircraft had. A projected total length of 11.44 m and a height of 4.75 m with a span of 16 m.

== Twin Project PC-10 ==
Under the name Twin Project PC-10 is a slightly larger plane was designed which possessed on the left rear fuselage just a passenger sliding door that opens to the rear. For it in the rear fuselage a loading door was built. The aircraft would have a total length of 13.50 m, a height of 6.08 meters and a wingspan of 19 meters. The machine should be able to transport 16 people, or nearly 2 tons of cargo. It had been equipped with a fixed landing gear and two Garrett TPE-331 or Pratt & Whitney PT6A-27 turboprop engines. Externally, the latter two designs regarding chassis, wings and engine assembly resembled strongly the DHC-6 Twin Otter, but the tailplane difference to an enlarged version of the Pilatus PC-6 and Pilatus PC -8 Twin Porter used that has no sweep. Development of the PC-10 was later transferred to Poligrat but little progress was made.

== PC-10 Masterporter ==
The PC-10 Masterporter was a project for a military cargo plane. Designed as a high-decker with two turbopropturbines, with a two-man cockpit, retractable landing gear and rear loading ramp. The size and design of the PC-10 Masterporter would have roughly corresponded to the CASA C-212. Since the demand for such an aircraft in the Swiss Air Force as a launch customer could not assert itself, the project was terminated.
