= Potez XIX =

1920s French bomber

Potez XIX Bn2
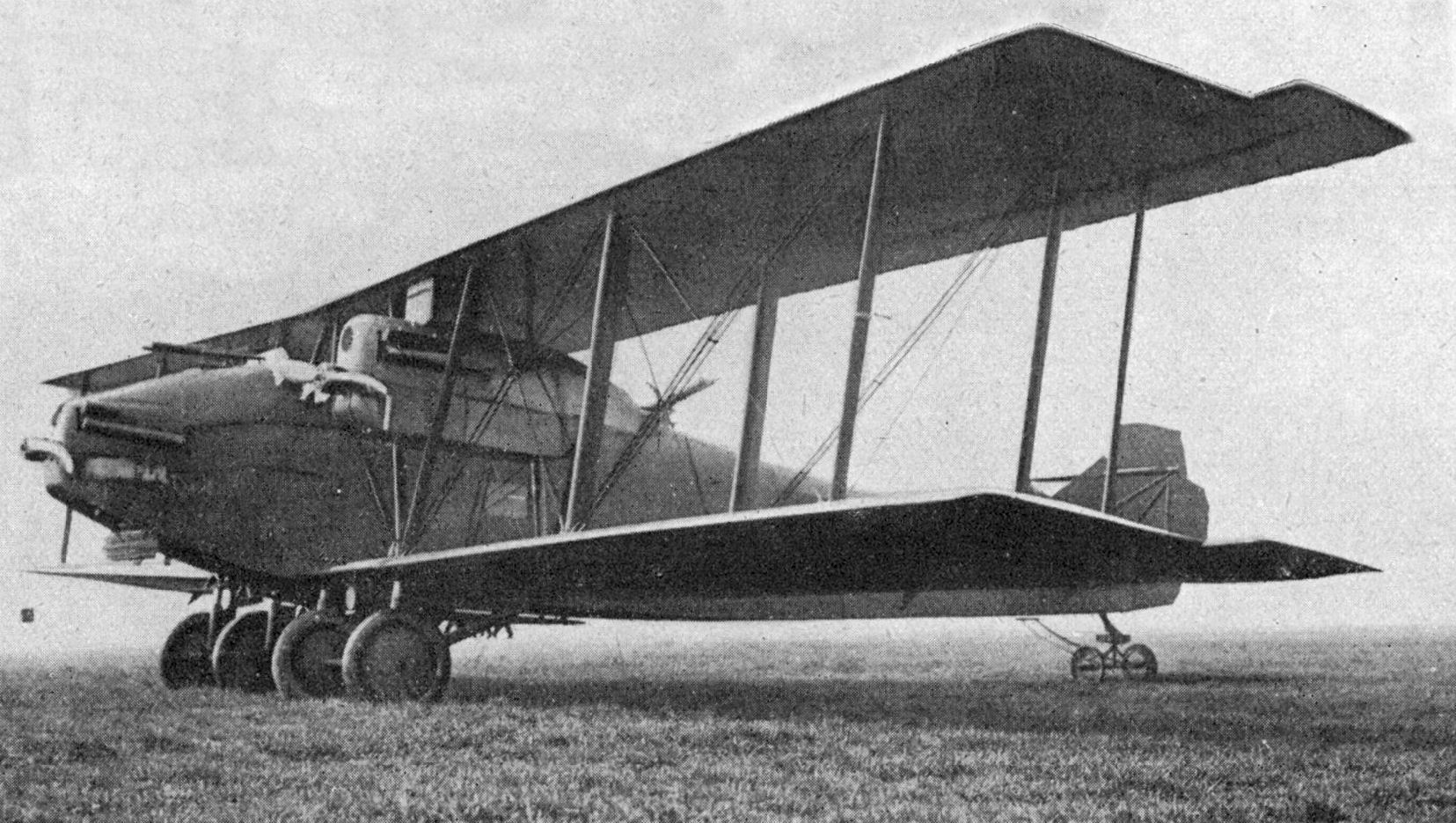

General information
- Type: Night bomber
- Manufacturer: Potez
- Number built: 1

History
- First flight: 1923

The Potez XIX was a prototype French night bomber built by Potez in the 1920s.

== Development ==
The Potez XIX first flew in 1923 but did not win orders from the French military. Tests of Potez XIX Bp.2 were conducted in Japan from August 31 to October 7, 1925. According to the test results, a small radius of action, a weak bomb load and poor communication between crew members were noted. Naturally, the Japanese military rejected this obsolete bomber.

== Specifications (Potez XIX) ==
Data from Airwar : Potez XIX, Aviaafrance :Potez XIX L'Aéronautique December 1923

General characteristics

- Crew: 2 or 3
- Length: 14.31 m (46 ft 11 in)
- Wingspan: 21.31 m (69 ft 11 in)
- Height: 4 m (13 ft 1 in)
- Wing area: 112 m^{2} (1,210 sq ft)
- Empty weight: 3,100 kg (6,834 lb)
- Gross weight: 4,730 kg (10,428 lb)
- Fuel capacity: 1,100 L (290 US gal; 240 imp gal)
- Powerplant: 3 × Hispano-Suiza 8Fb V-8 water-cooled piston engines, 220 kW (300 hp) each
- Propellers: 2-bladed fixed-pitch propellers

Performance

- Maximum speed: 170 km/h (110 mph, 92 kn) at 2,000 m (6,600 ft)
- Range: 800 km (500 mi, 430 nmi)
- Endurance: 5 hours
- Service ceiling: 5,650 m (18,540 ft)
- Time to altitude: 2,000 m (6,600 ft) in 9 minutes 33 seconds
- Wing loading: 42.5 kg/m^{2} (8.7 lb/sq ft)
- Power/mass: 0.0864 hp/lb (0.1420 kW/kg)

Armament

- Guns: 2x 7.7 mm (0.303 in) Lewis guns in a rear cockpit and 1x 7.7 mm (0.303 in) Lewis gun in a ventral position
- Bombs: 650 kg (1,430 lb) of bombs

== See also ==
Related lists

- List of military aircraft of France
- List of Interwar military aircraft
