= Pottier P.220S Koala =

French two-seat light homebuilt aircraft built by Avions Pottier

P.220S Koala

General information
- Type: Two-seat light aircraft
- National origin: France
- Manufacturer: Avions Pottier

History
- Developed from: Pottier P210S Coati
- Variants: Aero AT-3; Evektor Eurostar

The Pottier P.220S Koala is a French two-seat light homebuilt aircraft and built by Avions Pottier. Further three and four seat variants were also developed.

== Design and development ==
The Koala is based on the earlier P.210S Coati, a single-seat tailwheel monoplane. The Koala is a mainly metal construction low-wing monoplane with a swept-back single fin and powered by a 75 hp (56 kW) VW/Limbach engine. It has a fixed tricycle landing gear and an enclosed cabin for two side-by-side.

Three and four-seat variants have been produced and others with different engines have also been built in the Czech Republic by Evektor and Aertotechnik, and in Italy by SG Aviation.

== Variants ==
P.220S Koala
Two-seats side-by-side and powered by a 75 hp (56 kW) VW/Limbach engine.
P.230S Panda
Three-seat variant with a 100 hp (75 kW) Continental O-200 engine.
P.240S Saiga
Four-seat variant with a 180 hp (134 kW) Lycoming engine.
P.250S Xerus
Two-seat tandem seat variant of the Koala, not exactly the same size and has a one-piece canopy rather than a two-piece as other variants.
P.270S Amster
Four-seat variant like the P.240S but with a 150 hp (112 kW) Lycoming engine.

== Specifications (P.220S Koala) ==
Data from Jane's All the World's Aircraft 1999-2000

General characteristics

- Crew: 1
- Capacity: 1 passenger
- Length: 5.54 m (18 ft 2 in)
- Wingspan: 6.50 m (21 ft 4 in)
- Height: 1.95 m (6 ft 4.5 in)
- Wing area: 8.00 m^{2} (86.1 sq ft)
- Aspect ratio: 5.3
- Empty weight: 275 kg (606 lb)
- Gross weight: 500 kg (1,102 lb)
- Powerplant: 1 × VW/Limbach , 56 kW (75 hp)

Performance

- Maximum speed: 250 km/h (155 mph, 135 kn)
- Cruise speed: 190 km/h (118 mph, 103 kn)
- Stall speed: 90 km/h (56 mph, 49 kn)
- Range: 700 km (435 mi, 378 nmi)
- g limits: +5.7
- Rate of climb: 3.50 m/s (689 ft/min)
