= Pisarenko VOP-1 =

1920s Soviet sports aircraft

VOP-1
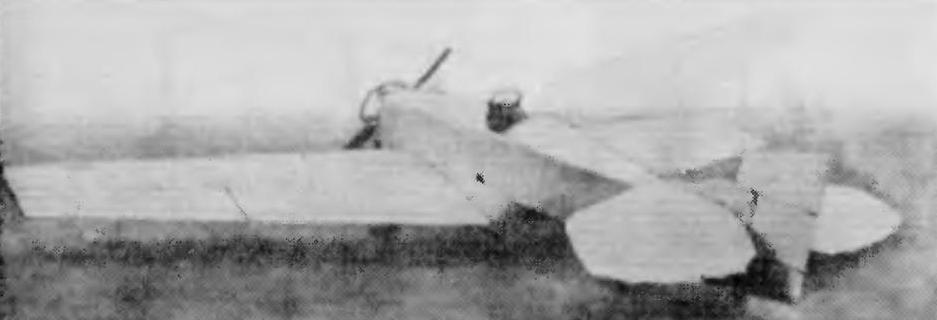

General information
- Type: Low-powered light sports aircraft
- National origin: Soviet Union
- Designer: Viktor Pisarenko
- Number built: 1

History
- First flight: 27 November 1923

The VOP-1 was a single-seat low-powered sports aircraft designed by Viktor Osipovich Pisarenko and built in the workshops of Kacha Military Aviation School. It first flew on 27 November 1923.

== Design and development ==
Viktor Pisarenko, a pilot with no aircraft design training, built the VOP-1 in the workshops of the Kacha Military Aviation School in 1923, where he was assisted by students. The resulting aircraft was a single-seat low-wing cantilever monoplane powered by a 35 hp (26 kW) Anzani engine. The pilot sat in an open cockpit. The VOP-1 was of wooden construction with plywood covering on the wings. The airfoil was unique, developed by the designer.

The aircraft was first flown on 27 November 1923 by Pisarenko and performed well. It was subsequently ferried to Moscow in January 1924 and made numerous flights.

== Specifications ==
Data from The Osprey Encyclopedia of Russian Aircraft

General characteristics

- Crew: one
- Length: 5 m (16 ft 5 in)
- Wingspan: 7.5 m (24 ft 7 in)
- Wing area: 10 m^{2} (110 sq ft)
- Empty weight: 222 kg (489 lb)
- Gross weight: 322 kg (710 lb)
- Powerplant: 1 × Anzani engine, 26 kW (35 hp)

Performance

- Maximum speed: 120 km/h (75 mph, 65 kn)
- Service ceiling: 1,200 m (3,900 ft)
