= Potez VIII =

Single-seat French training aircraft, 1920

- With Potez engine, at the 1920 Paris Salon

General information
- Type: Training and touring aircraft
- National origin: France
- Manufacturer: Potez
- Number built: c.15

History
- First flight: 9 April 1920

The Potez VIII was a French training aircraft which first flew in 1920. Originally it had a very unusual vertical inline engine and a four-wheeled undercarriage, though the production version was more conventional.

== Operators ==
France

- Aeronautical Service

Iran

- Imperial Iranian Air Force

2 operational aircraft reported in a British report on July 1st, 1925 (stored in India Office Records collection of documents). Only a few photographs remain.

== Design and development ==
The Potez VIII as first displayed, unflown, at the 1919 Paris Salon was a conventional small, single engine aircraft of its time apart from a most unusual engine and an unconventional undercarriage. It was a single bay biplane with rectangular plan wings mounted without stagger but with marked dihedral and braced with pair of parallel, airfoil section interplane struts. A pair of inverted V cabane struts, parallel to each other, joined the central section of the upper wing to the upper fuselage longerons. There were ailerons on the upper wing only. The wings were duralumin two spar structures with fabric covering.

The Potez VIII had a simple, flat-sided fuselage with a wooden structure and plywood skinning. There were tandem open cockpits, the forward one under the upper wing, which was mounted well above it, and the other just aft of the trailing edge, which had a rounded cut-out to assist the pilot's upward vision. The empennage was conventional, with a tailplane on the upper fuselage and a broad chord, swept-edge fin wire braced to it. The tail structure was similar to that of the wing, with a metal frame and fabric covering.

The engine of the 1919 aircraft was also a Potez design, the 41 kW (55 hp) A-4. This was a four-cylinder inline built to run with its crankshaft vertical. It was mounted with its exposed cylinders pointing forwards for cooling and had gearing that turned the output through 90° to drive a two-blade propeller. Although the Potez A-4 was unsuccessful, its configuration produced the high power line and low centre of gravity of later inverted inline engines, allowing a shorter undercarriage, easier access to the cockpits and a better forward view over a shorter, lower nose than its inline contemporaries. The high propeller shaft also allowed a shorter undercarriage; a four-wheeled unit protected the propeller tips from contact with the ground.

The A-4 engined Potez VIII first flew on 19 April 1920. When its engine was recognised as a failure the A-4 was replaced by a six-cylinder Anzani radial engine, mounted uncowled in the nose. An early version produced 37 kW (50 hp) and a later variant 52 kW (70 hp). Initially the four wheel undercarriage was retained but when the Potez VIII appeared at the 1922 Paris Salon it had more conventional two wheel gear. The wheels were on a single axle. From each end of the axle a strut ran to the underside of the forward fuselage, acting together with a vertical telescopic, rubber damped shock absorber. At least one example flew as a floatplane, designated Potez VIII H (H for hydravion or water plane). It had a single, central float and a small, airfoil section stabilizing float under each wing.

A side-by-side version was also built and designated the Potez VIII R; it was a little heavier, with a wider fuselage and powered by a fully cowled 80 hp (60 kW) Le Rhone 9C engine. It returned to the four wheel undercarriage.

Reconstructed pre-World War II civil registers suggest about fifteen powered Potez VIIIs were built. There was also a glider version, the Potez VIII P (P for planeur or glider) with a smooth aluminium nosecap in place of the engine. This was slightly (150 mm (5.9 in)) longer and lighter with an empty weight of 110 kg (243 lb) compared with the 330 kg (728 lb) of the Anzani powered version. It was the overall winner at the First Glider Congress, held in Clermont-Ferrand, which ended on 30 August 1922.

The powered version also had competition success, coming second in the first La Coupe de Consummation d'Aviation Zénith (The Zénith Cup for Aircraft Fuel Consumption), based on a return flight from Paris to Lyon flown over 21–22 August 1923. The deciding parameter was the ratio of weight of fuel used to payload. The Potez scored 0.616, the winner, a Farman F.90, 0.473.

Four Potez VIIIs were registered in Bulgaria.

== Variants ==
Anzani powered, two wheel version

VIII prototype
Potez A-4 engine, 41 kW (55 hp).
VIII
Anzani 6A engine, 37 kW (50 hp)
VIIIA
Anzani 6A engine, 52 kW (70 hp).
VIII H
Floatplane.
VIII P
Glider.
VIII R
Side by side seating, Le Rhône 9C engine, 67 kW (90 hp).

== Specifications (70 hp Anzani) ==
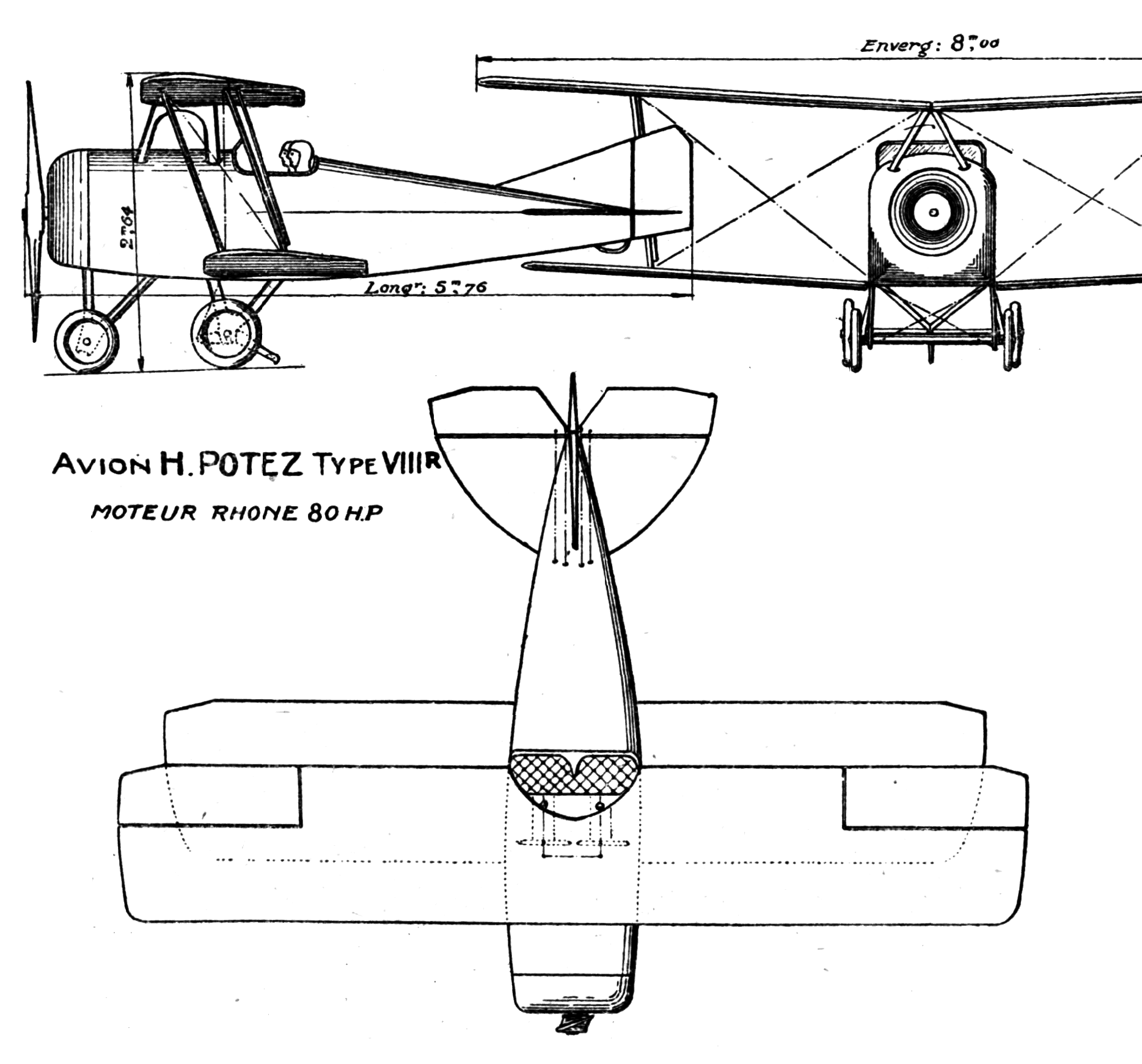
Potez VIII R 3-view drawing from L'Aéronautique January 1921

Data from Aérophile - Salon 1924, p.23

General characteristics

- Crew: Two
- Length: 5.72 m (18 ft 9 in)
- Upper wingspan: 8.0 m (26 ft 3 in)
- Lower wingspan: 6.85 m (22 ft 6 in)
- Height: 2.50 m (8 ft 2 in)
- Wing area: 20 m^{2} (220 sq ft)
- Empty weight: 330 kg (728 lb)
- Gross weight: 555 kg (1,224 lb)
- Fuel capacity: 60 L (13 imp gal; 16 US gal)
- Powerplant: 1 × Anzani 6-cylinder, two-row air-cooled radial, 52 kW (70 hp)
- Propellers: 2-bladed

Performance

- Maximum speed: 145 km/h (90 mph, 78 kn)
- Service ceiling: 4,000 m (13,000 ft)
- Wing loading: 27.5 kg/m^{2} (5.6 lb/sq ft)

== Bibliography ==
- Andersson, Lennart (July 1998). "Histoire de l'aéronautique persane, 1921–1941: La première aviation du Chah d'Iran" [History of the Persian Air Force, 1921–1941: The First Aircraft of the Shah of Iran]. Avions: Toute l'aéronautique et son histoire (in French) (76): 2–12. ISSN 1243-8650.
- Anderson, Lennart (November–December 2019). "La renaissance de l'aviation militair bulgare dans les années vingt" [The Rebirth of Bulgarian Military Aviation in the Twenties]. Avions (in French) (232): 52–66. ISSN 1243-8650.
- Coroller, Jean-Louis (September 1998). "Les premièrs avions Henry Potez (première partie)" [The First Aircraft of Henry Potez]. Avions: Toute l'aéronautique et son histoire (in French) (66): 8–14. ISSN 1243-8650.
