= PRS One =

German paraglider

One

General information
- Type: Paraglider
- National origin: Germany
- Manufacturer: Pilots Right Stuff
- Status: Production completed

History
- Introduction date: late 2000

The PRS One is a German single-place paraglider that was produced by Pilots Right Stuff (PRS) of Brannenburg, starting in 2000. It was designed with outside contract assistance. The glider is now out of production.

== Design and development ==
The company decided to contract out design work on the glider, rather than establish its own design department, as its limited line of gliders was intended to fill particular market niches, rather than offer a complete line of gliders and this made contract design more cost efficient.

The aircraft was designed as a beginner and intermediate glider. It was certified as a purely DHV Class 1 glider, from which it takes its name. The four model sizes produced are each named for their relative size.

The design is made from high-tenacity, low-porosity material of 49 g/m^{2} and incorporates diagonal tapes instead of the more commonly used whole diagonal ribs. The tapes form triangles, in conjunction with reinforcement tapes on the bottom surface of the glider wing and prevent airfoil deformation. The wing also is constructed with a trailing edge tape that extends across the complete wing's span. This tape reduces canopy oscillations and stiffens the wing in flight. Small intermediate 30 to 40 cm (12 to 16 in) ribs are also sewn into the wing's trailing edge to improve stability. The wing also has "safety cells" of line attachment tapes that extend to the wing top surface, reducing the risk of "zipper" line failures. These design features result in a wing that provides good performance with high stability.

Flight testing showed that the wing inflates easily, regardless of wing layout on the ground.

== Operational history ==
Reviewer Rainer Lodes described the One in a 2000 review as having "achieved an optimum synthesis of a nice, co-ordinated handling with a high level of passive safety at the same time. The well balanced handling should satisfy even very demanding pilots: Even small movements on the controls are directly converted by the One without any delay. If you want to turn flat or tight, this glider does not leave any desires unsatisfied. The control forces are progressively rising and can be described as average high ... This canopy shows a convincing safety even when the pilot makes major mistakes like the too fast release of a spiral dive or high wing overs without counter-breaking or even when doing a provoked 50 percent asymmetric deflation and holding the A-risers down without counter-breaking."

In evaluating the One, Lodes concluded, "the performance data are not far from cross country gliders anymore – combined with excellent handling characteristics and really maximum safety. The One can without a doubt be called a trend setter."

== Variants ==
One S
Small-sized model for lighter pilots. Its 11.0 m (36.1 ft) span wing has a wing area of 25.2 m^{2} (271 sq ft), 56 cells and the aspect ratio is 4.8:1. The glider model is DHV 1 GH certified.
One M
Mid-sized model for medium-weight pilots. Its 11.6 m (38.1 ft) span wing has a wing area of 26.9 m^{2} (290 sq ft), 60 cells and the aspect ratio is 5.0:1. The pilot weight range is 75 to 95 kg (165 to 209 lb). The glider model is DHV 1 GH certified.
One L
Large-sized model for heavier pilots. Its 12.0 m (39.4 ft) span wing has a wing area of 28.6 m^{2} (308 sq ft), 60 cells and the aspect ratio is 5.0:1. The glider model is DHV 1 GH certified.
One XL
Extra large-sized model for heavier pilots. Its 12.4 m (40.7 ft) span wing has a wing area of 30.9 m^{2} (333 sq ft), 64 cells and the aspect ratio is 5.0:1. The glider model is DHV 1 GH certified.

== Specifications (One M) ==
Data from Lodes

General characteristics

- Crew: one
- Wingspan: 11.6 m (38 ft 1 in)
- Wing area: 26.9 m^{2} (290 sq ft)
- Aspect ratio: 5.0:1

Performance

- Maximum speed: 46 km/h (29 mph, 25 kn)
- Cruise speed: 39 km/h (24 mph, 21 kn)
- Stall speed: 22 km/h (14 mph, 12 kn)
- Rate of sink: 1.2 m/s (240 ft/min)
