= PRS Pilot One =

German paraglider

Pilot One

General information
- Type: Paraglider
- National origin: Germany
- Manufacturer: Pilots Right Stuff (PRS)
- Status: Production completed

The PRS Pilot One is a German single-place paraglider that was designed and produced by Pilots Right Stuff (PRS) of Brannenburg. It is now out of production.

== Design and development ==
The aircraft was designed as a simple and safe to fly DHV Level 1 glider. The models are each named for their relative size.

== Variants ==
Pilot One S
Small-sized model for lighter pilots. Its 11.0 m (36.1 ft) span wing has a wing area of 25.2 m^{2} (271 sq ft), 56 cells and the aspect ratio is 4.8:1. The pilot weight range is 60 to 80 kg (132 to 176 lb). The glider model is DHV 1 certified.
Pilot One M
Mid-sized model for medium-weight pilots. Its 11.6 m (38.1 ft) span wing has a wing area of 26.9 m^{2} (290 sq ft), 60 cells and the aspect ratio is 5:1. The pilot weight range is 75 to 95 kg (165 to 209 lb). The glider model is DHV 1 certified.
Pilot One L
Large-sized model for heavier pilots. Its 11.95 m (39.2 ft) span wing has a wing area of 28.6 m^{2} (308 sq ft), 60 cells and the aspect ratio is 5:1. The pilot weight range is 90 to 110 kg (198 to 243 lb). The glider model is DHV 1 certified.
Pilot One XL
Large-sized model for heavier pilots. Its 12.4 m (40.7 ft) span wing has a wing area of 30.9 m^{2} (333 sq ft), 64 cells and the aspect ratio is 5:1. The pilot weight range is 105 to 130 kg (231 to 287 lb). The glider model is DHV 1 certified.

== Specifications (Pilot One M) ==
Data from Bertrand

General characteristics

- Crew: one
- Wingspan: 11.6 m (38 ft 1 in)
- Wing area: 26.9 m^{2} (290 sq ft)
- Aspect ratio: 5:1

Performance

- Maximum speed: 48 km/h (30 mph, 26 kn)

== See also ==
- PRS Peak
