= PZL-112 Junior =

General information
- Type: Trainer
- National origin: Poland
- Manufacturer: EADS PZL Warszawa-Okecie
- Number built: 1

History
- First flight: 17 Jun 2000

The EADS PZL PZL-112 Junior is a Polish single engine, two-seat trainer built by PZL Warszawa-Okecie.

== Development and design ==
The PZL-112 Junior was designed by PZL Warszawa-Okecie in collaboration with the Warsaw University of Technology as a low-cost trainer for Polish flying clubs. It was originally known as the Koliber Junior as it used some components from the PZL-110 Koliber. The Junior is a metal low-wing cantilever monoplane with a swept back vertical tail and a small ventral fin. It has a fixed tricycle landing gear and is powered by a nose-mounted Lycoming O-235-L2C flat-four piston engine driving a two-bladed propeller. It has two side-by-side configuration seats in an enclosed cabin with a gull-wing canopy. Construction of the prototype was started in 1997 and it first flew on 17 Jun 2000.

== Specifications ==
Data from Jane's All the World's Aircraft 2003-04

General characteristics

- Crew: two
- Length: 6.651 m (21 ft 10 in)
- Wingspan: 8.803 m (28 ft 11 in)
- Height: 2.625 m (8 ft 7 in)
- Wing area: 11.44 m^{2} (123.1 sq ft)
- Empty weight: 520 kg (1,146 lb)
- Max takeoff weight: 750 kg (1,653 lb)
- Powerplant: 1 × Lycoming O-235-L2C Flat-four piston engine, 87 kW (116 hp)
- Propellers: 2-bladed Hoffmann HO-14HM-175-131

Performance

- Maximum speed: 210 km/h (130 mph, 110 kn)
- Cruise speed: 97 km/h (60 mph, 52 kn)
- Stall speed: 80 km/h (50 mph, 43 kn) Flaps down
- Never exceed speed: 262 km/h (163 mph, 141 kn)
- Range: 750 km (470 mi, 400 nmi)
- Service ceiling: 4,000 m (13,000 ft)
- g limits: +4.4/-1.8
- Rate of climb: 3.50 m/s (689 ft/min)
- Wing loading: 65.56 kg/m^{2} (13.43 lb/sq ft)

== See also ==
Related development

- PZL-110 Koliber
