= Poite 3 =

General information
- Type: Two-seat tourer
- National origin: France
- Manufacturer: Usines S.Poite
- Designer: Tétart
- Number built: 1

History
- First flight: August 1931

The Poite 3 was a one-off, all metal touring aircraft which seated two in tandem. It was built and flown in France in 1931.

== Design and development ==
The factory of S. Poite was well known to French aircraft manufacturers for its expertise in welded light metal structures, particularly their fuel tanks but also fuselage frames such as that of the Bodiansky 20. The Poite 3 is the only known aircraft carrying the factory's name. It was designed by M. Tétart and was an all-metal aircraft.

The Poite 3 had a three part, low, cantilever wing, built around twin spars and having a high aspect ratio (10.8). There was a rectangular centre-section which filled about one quarter of the span and almost triangular outer panels which carried light dihedral and tapered in thickness. Its ailerons occupied about half the trailing edges of the outer panels and increased in chord inboard.

Its fuselage was also in three parts, with the engine mountings forward, a central part including the cabin and a rear section supporting the tail; these sections could be easily separated. It was powered by a 71 kW (95 hp) Renault 4 four-cylinder. upright, air-cooled in-line engine. This was closely and unusually cowled with the cylinders completely enclosed in an upper fairing, tapering in plan, which continued aft to the front of the cabin windscreen framing which it matched in height. There were air intakes in the lower sides of the engine cowling; the fuel tank, disposable in an emergency, was behind the engine. Behind that the well-furnished cabin seated pilot and passenger in tandem, with the pilot over the wing and the passenger just aft of the trailing edge. Its multi-glazed enclosure included long transparencies behind the rear seat, ending close to the tail. Access to each seat was via a side door, to starboard for the forward seat and port for the aft, which when opened also raised the corresponding roof panel; the two roof panels could be opened independently of the doors in flight to allow escapes by parachute. As an alternative arrangement, users could specify open cockpits.

The rear fuselage tapered strongly in profile and ended wider than deep; the leading edge of the high aspect ratio horizontal tail, overall trapezoidal in plan and with rounded tips, was joined to it. The fin of the Poite 3 was tall and narrow, though its unbalanced rudder was more generous; the vertical tail had a blunted triangular profile. The rudder ended clear of the elevators, which were also unbalanced.

The Poite 3 had fixed, tail wheel landing gear, mounted from the outer wing centre-section with a track of 2.40 m (7 ft 10 in). Each main wheel leg was based on a pylon formed by an almost vertical, quadrilateral, braced plate from the forward spar with its lower edge joined to the base of a triangular plate, its vertex fixed to the rear spar. Each main wheel axle was mounted on a horizontal U-shaped frame hinged to the bottom of the pylon, with a forked vertical leg containing a rubber-ring Weydert shock absorber attached to a short forward spar extension. The whole structure was enclosed in a trouser-type fairing, with a forward, semi-circular extension for the wheel. The castoring tail wheel had a similar shock absorber and fairing. The main wheels were fitted with independent brakes.

Overall, the Poite 3 was an aerodynamically clean aircraft, with a high aspect ratio wing to minimise induced drag. A maximum lift to drag ratio of 15.4 was calculated, high for a powered aircraft at that time.

The Poite 3 first flew in early August 1930, piloted by Massot. Only the prototype, registered F-ALCZ, was completed. By September 1931 it had been registered to take part in the Official Competition for Touring Aircraft held the following month. No record of its participation or subsequent development has survived.

== Specifications ==
Data from Les Ailes August 1931

General characteristics

- Crew: One
- Capacity: One passenger
- Length: 7.80 m (25 ft 7 in)
- Wingspan: 12.70 m (41 ft 8 in)
- Height: 2.45 m (8 ft 0 in)
- Wing area: 15 m^{2} (160 sq ft)
- Aspect ratio: 10.8
- Empty weight: 440 kg (970 lb)
- Gross weight: 750 kg (1,653 lb)
- Powerplant: 1 × Renault 4P 4-cylinder air-cooled upright inline, 71 kW (95 hp)
- Propellers: 2-bladed Ratier, direct drive, metal

Performance

- Maximum speed: 200 km/h (120 mph, 110 kn)
- Cruise speed: 180 km/h (110 mph, 97 kn)
- Range: 820 km (510 mi, 440 nmi)
- Service ceiling: 6,600 m (21,700 ft) absolute
- Rate of climb: 5.25 m/s (1,033 ft/min)
- Lift-to-drag: 15.4
- Landing speed: 78 km/h (48 mph; 42 kn)
