= PRS Peak =

German single-place paraglider

Peak

General information
- Type: Paraglider
- National origin: Germany
- Manufacturer: Pilots Right Stuff (PRS)
- Status: Production completed

The PRS Peak is a German single-place paraglider that was designed by Pilots Right Stuff (PRS) in conjunction with Robbie Whittall and Ozone Gliders and produced by Pilots Right Stuff of Brannenburg. It is now out of production.

== Design and development ==
The aircraft was designed as a mountaineering descent glider. Reviewer Noel Bertrand noted in a 2003 review that the Peak "opened up a market for very lightweight Para-Trekking models and several competitors have moved into this market gap."

The models are each named for their relative size.

== Variants ==
Peak S
Small-sized model for lighter pilots. Its 11.1 m (36.4 ft) span wing has a wing area of 25.37 m^{2} (273.1 sq ft), 33 cells and the aspect ratio is 4.86:1. The pilot weight range is 60 to 85 kg (132 to 187 lb). The glider model is DHV 1 certified.
Peak M
Mid-sized model for medium-weight pilots. Its 11.57 m (38.0 ft) span wing has a wing area of 25.52 m^{2} (274.7 sq ft), 33 cells and the aspect ratio is 4.86:1. The pilot weight range is 80 to 100 kg (176 to 220 lb). The glider model is DHV 1 certified.
Peak L
Large-sized model for heavier pilots. Its 12.03 m (39.5 ft) span wing has a wing area of 29.76 m^{2} (320.3 sq ft), 33 cells and the aspect ratio is 4.86:1. The pilot weight range is 95 to 120 kg (209 to 265 lb). The glider model is DHV 1 certified.

== Specifications (Peak M) ==
Data from Bertrand

General characteristics

- Crew: one
- Wingspan: 11.57 m (38 ft 0 in)
- Wing area: 27.52 m^{2} (296.2 sq ft)
- Aspect ratio: 4.86:1

Performance

- Maximum speed: 46 km/h (29 mph, 25 kn)

== See also ==
- PRS Pilot One
