= Poullin JP.30 =

French single-seat agricultural aircraft

JP.30
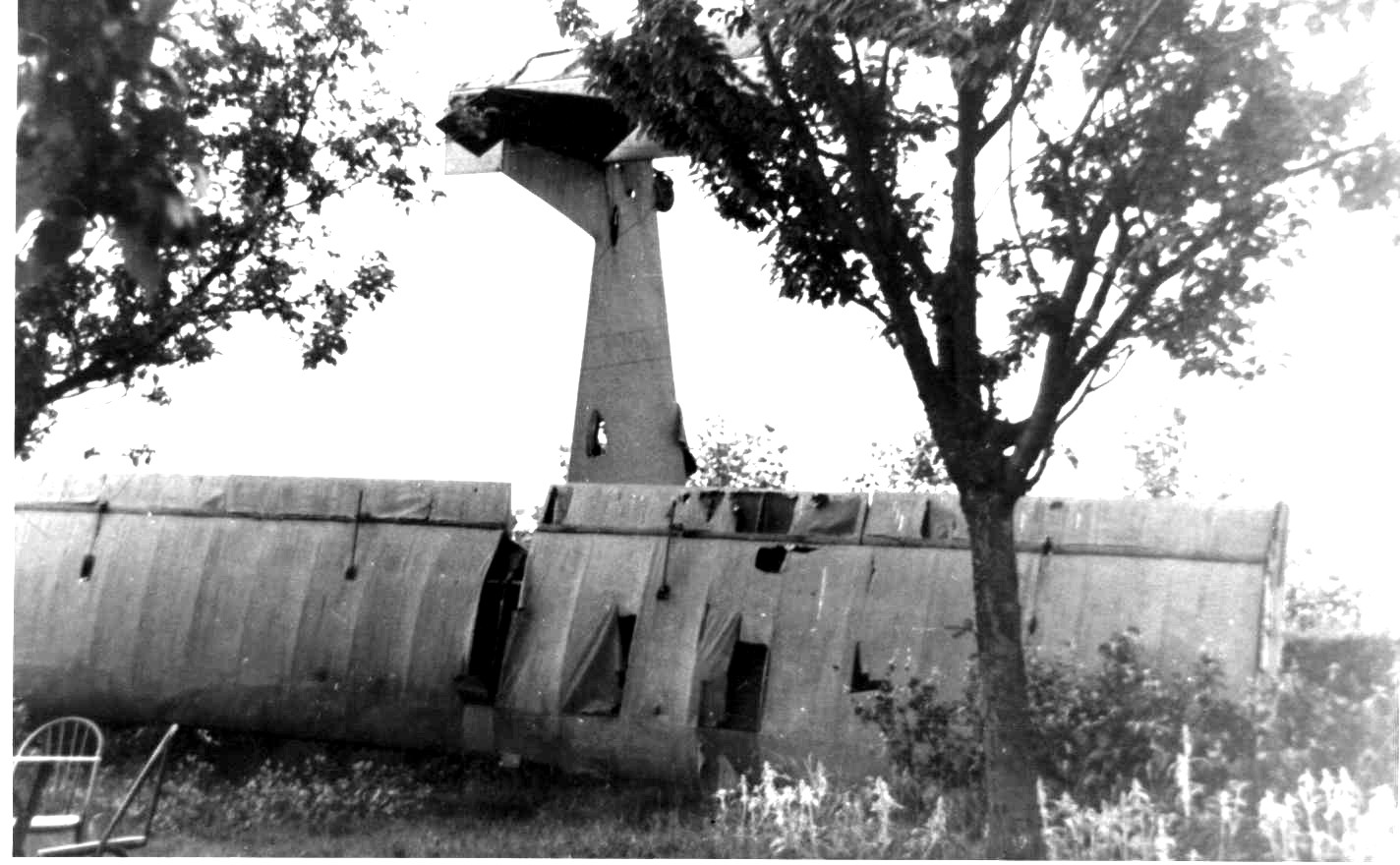
- The sole Poullin JP.30 after retirement, up-ended on its nose, in use as an advertising feature at Guyancourt airfield, Paris, in June 1963.

General information
- Type: single-seat agricultural aircraft
- National origin: France
- Designer: Jean Poullin
- Status: scrapped
- Primary user: agriculture
- Number built: 1

History
- Introduction date: 1952
- First flight: 15 August 1952

The Poullin JP.30 was a French single-seat agricultural aircraft designed and built by Jean Poullin, of which one example was constructed and first flown on 15 August 1952.

== Development ==
The JP.30 was specified for agricultural use including crop-spraying. The powerplant was a Continental C-90 of 90 hp (67 kW). It was a single-seat high-wing monoplane with a fixed tailwheel undercarriage.

== Operational history ==
After several years agricultural service, the aircraft, F-WGIR, was retired and used as an advertising feature for the former Bar de l'Escadrille at Guyancourt airfield to the west of Paris, where it was last noted in June 1963.

== Specifications (variant) ==
Data from Aviafrance

General characteristics

- Crew: 1
- Length: 6.06 m (19 ft 11 in)
- Wingspan: 10.00 m (32 ft 10 in)
- Height: 2.1 m (6 ft 11 in)
- Empty weight: 445 kg (981 lb)
- Gross weight: 695 kg (1,532 lb)
- Powerplant: 1 × Continental C-90 , 67 kW (90 hp)

Performance

- Maximum speed: 140 km/h (87 mph, 76 kn)
