= Polyt V =

Single-engined, single-seat glider tug

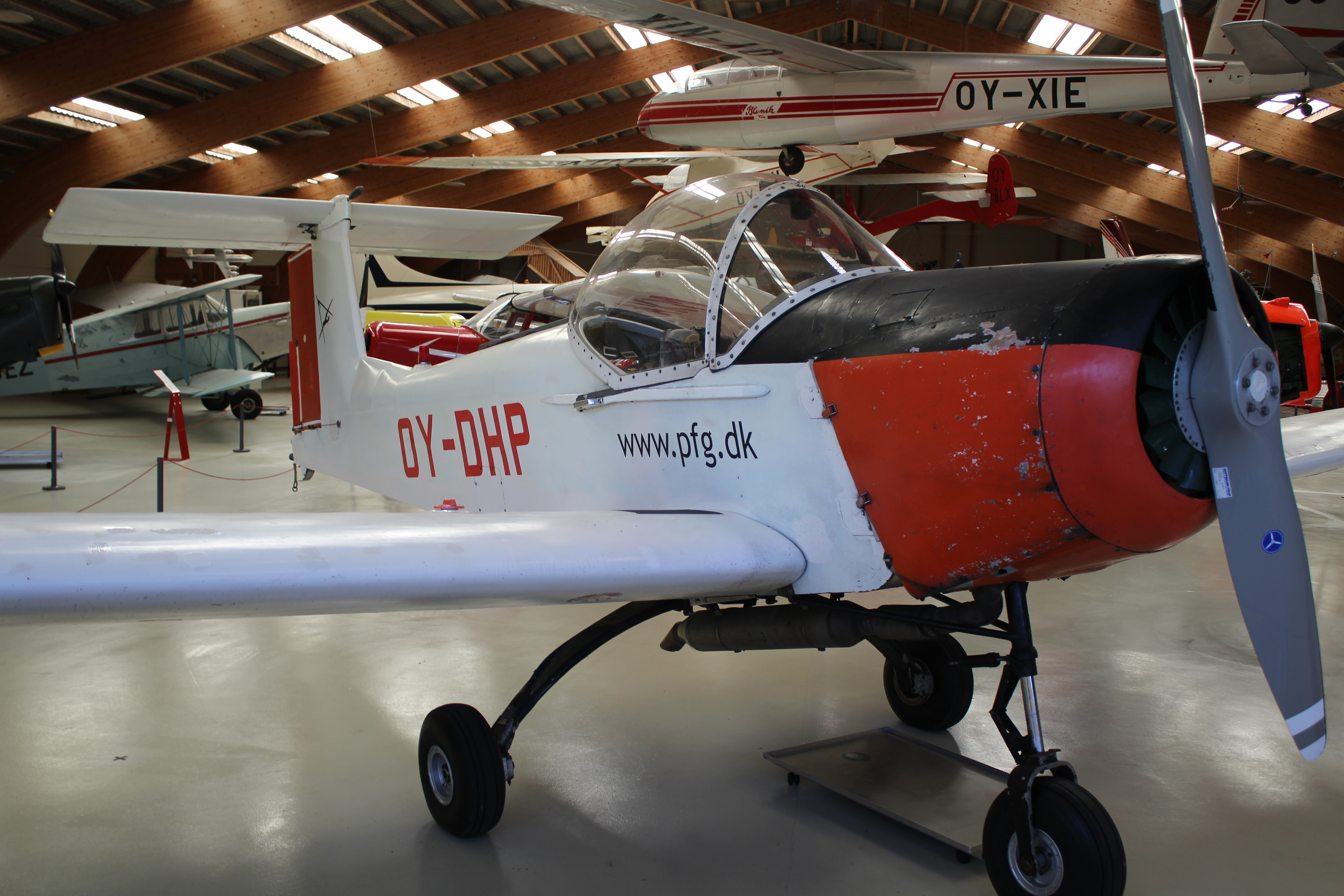

General information
- Type: Single-seat glider tug
- National origin: Denmark
- Manufacturer: Polyteknisk Flyvegruppe (Flying Group of the Technical University of Denmark)
- Designer: Helge Petersen
- Number built: 1

History
- First flight: 12 April 1970

The Polyt V is a single-engined, single-seat glider tug designed and built by graduates and students of the Technical University of Denmark. Only one was constructed but it has had a long active life.

== Design and development ==
The Polyt V, sometimes written as Polyt 5, was intended from the start as a glider tug. It was designed by six members of the Flying Group of the Technical University of Denmark, Copenhagen, a group comprising about 50 students and graduates of that University. As many as 20 other Group members built the aircraft. The Polyt V flew for the first time on 12 April 1970.

It is a low wing, single-seat monoplane with a fixed tricycle undercarriage and a high T-tail, powered by a 200 hp (150 kW) Lycoming IO-360 flat four engine. The powerful engine in combination with a light wooden structure facilitates high rates of climb. The climb rate results in short towing times, and the ability to tow even the heaviest two seated gliders with water ballast. Its wings are built around a wooden box spar and plywood covered except for fibreglass leading edges. They carry wide span ailerons with trim tabs; inboard are glider style aluminium spoilers or airbrakes combined with the flaps, which can be extended to 50° to slow the aircraft after a diving release of the glider. When deployed, the spoiler surfaces extend above the wing, with the upper part being perforated. The tail surfaces are all wood structurally, with plywood covered fixed surfaces and a fabric covered rudder with a short trim tab. The all moving, fabric covered, constant chord tailplane carries full span anti-tabs. The large control surfaces is chosen so the tow pilot still has a lot of control authority when "combating" the potential odd forces from towing an inexperienced sailplane pilot behind him whose flying is a bit unstable.

The fuselage of the Polyt V is a plywood covered box structure, the pilot sitting over the wing under a single piece, rearward-sliding canopy. The bubble canopy in combination with the low wing position gives the tow pilot an excellent view, that is practical for avoiding a midair collision when towing a sailplane into a huge gaggle during a competition. An electrically driven winch at the rear retrieves the launch cable, which exits the aircraft at the narrow extreme stern of the fuselage, at a rate of about 1 m/s. Pulling the rope in decreases the landing distance, since it prevents the rope from being caught in obstacles near the end of the runway on a low final. This feature minimizes the turn-around-time for the Polyt V, so the sailplanes can all be towed to the starting position in a shorter amount of time during a competition. The engine installation is unusual in having a 16 blade adjustable intake cooling fan in the cowling immediately behind the propeller, for low speed high power flight. This additional cooling is automatically blanked off during a dive.

The main wheels are mounted on a 3 m diameter semi-circular glass fibre arc attached to the fuselage underside; the nose wheel unit is largely that of a Piper Colt. The springiness and large dampening factor in the main undercarriage makes the Polyt V tolerant of imprecise flaring and the uneven ground surfaces typically found when towing a plane home from an outlanding on a field.

== Operational history ==
The Polyteknisk Flyvegruppe have used the sole Polyt V to launch their various gliders from 1970 until 2020. OY-DHP is no longer in service, but is on display at the Danish Aircraft Museum, Stauning from summer 2021. Some modifications have been made: the original Polyteknisk designed propeller, optimised for low speed flight has been replaced by a quieter Hoffmann one and the rudder trim tab has been extended to half rudder height. Furthermore the engine cowling has been reshaped and the livery changed from bright orange to a less aggressive white look with orange wingtips, rudder and engine cowling for visibility.

== Specifications ==
Data from Jane's All the World's Aircraft 1972-73

General characteristics

- Crew: 1
- Length: 6.20 m (20 ft 4 in)
- Wingspan: 9.60 m (31 ft 6 in)
- Height: 2.60 m (8 ft 6 in)
- Wing area: 14.4 m^{2} (155 sq ft)
- Empty weight: 615 kg (1,356 lb)
- Max takeoff weight: 760 kg (1,676 lb)
- Powerplant: 1 × Lycoming IO-360-A2B 4-cylinder horizontally opposed air cooled piston, 150 kW (200 hp)
- Propellers: 2-bladed Polyteknisk designed wooden fixed pitch, 2.05 m (6 ft 9 in) diameter

Performance

- Maximum speed: 200 km/h (120 mph, 110 kn) at sea level
- Cruise speed: 185 km/h (115 mph, 100 kn) maximum
- Endurance: about 2 hrs
- Service ceiling: 5,500 m (18,000 ft)
- Rate of climb: 5.3 m/s (1,040 ft/min) towing single-seat glider, 8 m/s (1,575 ft/min) solo
- Wing loading: 52.8 kg/m^{2} (10.8 lb/sq ft)
- Power/mass: 5.06 kg/kW

== See also ==
Related development

- Polyt I sailplane
- Polyt II primary glider
- Polyt III two seat sailplane
- Polyt IV honeycomb sailplane
