= Polen Special =

Homebuilt racing aircraft

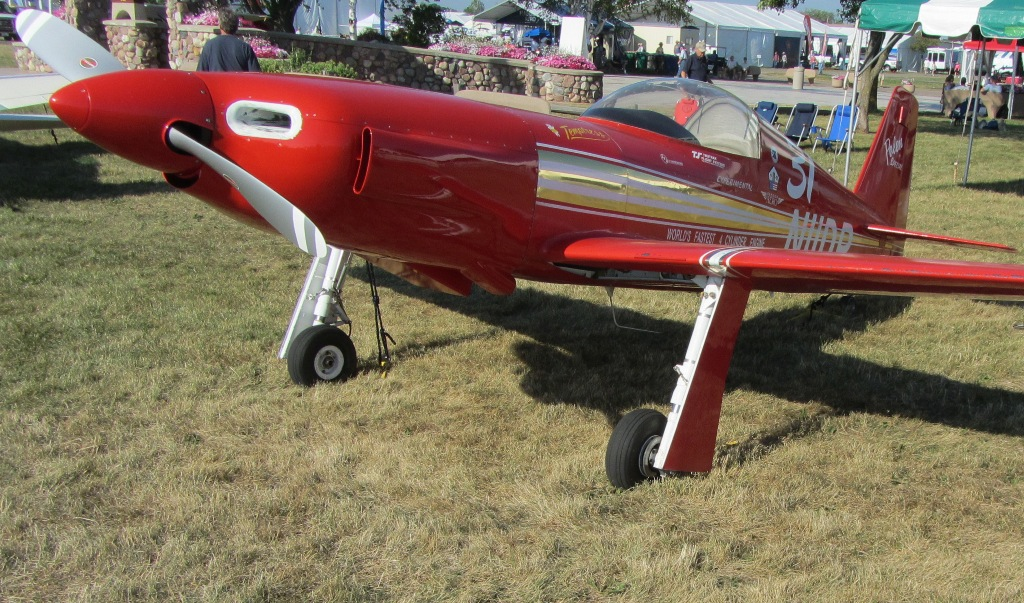

General information
- Type: Homebuilt aircraft
- National origin: United States
- Designer: Dennis Polen, Darryl Usher

History
- First flight: May 1972

The Polen Special, is a homebuilt racing aircraft built to become the fastest four cylinder aircraft in the world.

== Development ==
The Polen Special, (Also known as the Polen Special II) development started in October 1967 by Dennis Polen and Darryl Usher. The project to build a fast single seat racer larger than Formula One limitations began as a retractable gear Midget Mustang modification. After reviewing engine installation shortcomings, a clean sheet design was started. The Polen Special was then designed around a Piper Comanche engine and cowling, which also had design issues with engine canting and required cowling modifications for a single engine installation. A new clean sheet Lycoming IO-360 installation came afterward. Two sets of retractable landing gear were built and tested, but were sold to other homebuilders. Over time, the RayJay turbocharger was removed due to hunting and composite ailerons were installed. The aircraft was sold by Polen to Richard C. Keyt and has been modified several times to increase efficiency and safety. A composite rudder replaced the all-metal rudder that fluttered to destruction at 2500 engine RPM and a modern turbocharger was installed. Keyt and partner Jack Zimmanck formed the Polen Company to develop aircraft technologies with the Polen Special as a flying testbed. A design modification called the "Stage 3" is underway incorporate further improvements.

== Design ==
The Polen Special is a low-wing monoplane with retractable conventional landing gear. The retractable gear is hydraulically operated from a T-33 sequencing valve with electric powered gear doors. The fuselage and wings are all aluminum with flush riveting. The ailerons and elevators use push-pull tubes, with cable control for the rudders. The aircraft is specifically designed to fly at high altitude on IFR routes with the pilot using supplemental oxygen to achieve maximum speed with the turbocharged engine.

== Operational history ==
- 1976: The Polen Special was demonstrated publicly at the Experimental Aircraft Association airshow in Oshkosh, Wisconsin, winning the Reserve Grand Champion homebuilt award.
- 1998: The Paul H. Poberezny Classic Homebuilt Award was awarded to the Polen Special
- 2000: The Polen Special won the Copperstate Dash race, landing on one main gear after a malfunction. The elevator spars and spinner were cracked and an engine replacement was required afterward.
- 2001: The Polen Special set the FAI Class C-1.b (takeoff weight 500 to 1000 kg) speed record of 303.4 mph (488.3 km/h) for a 500 km (310 mi) circuit; the record still stands in 2022. (The Flying article says it flew 360 miles between Oshkosh and Monticello IA in 70 min 03 sec.) Pilot-owner Richard C. Keyt won the Blériot medal for the effort.
- 2002: Keyt won the 305 mile Copperstate Dash race at an average speed of 258.23 knots (478.24 km/h; 297.17 mph).

== Specifications (Polen Special II) ==
Data from Sport Aviation

General characteristics

- Crew: 1
- Length: 19 ft 6 in (5.94 m)
- Wingspan: 21 ft 5 in (6.53 m)
- Height: 4 ft 10 in (1.47 m)
- Wing area: 94 sq ft (8.7 m^{2})
- Airfoil: NACA 65212
- Empty weight: 1,035 lb (469 kg)
- Gross weight: 1,500 lb (680 kg)
- Fuel capacity: 50 U.S. gallons (190 L; 42 imp gal)
- Powerplant: 1 × Lycoming TSIO-360A1A Horizontally opposed four cylinder, 200 hp (150 kW)
- Propellers: 2-bladed

Performance

- Maximum speed: 300 kn (345 mph, 555 km/h)
- Cruise speed: 240 kn (280 mph, 450 km/h)
- Stall speed: 49 kn (56 mph, 90 km/h)
- Service ceiling: 20,000 ft (6,100 m)
- Rate of climb: 4,000 ft/min (20 m/s)
- Wing loading: 16 lb/sq ft (78 kg/m^{2})

== See also ==
Aircraft of comparable role, configuration, and era

- Mustang Aeronautics Midget Mustang
