= Polikarpov TB-2 =

TB-2

General information
- Type: Bomber
- National origin: Soviet Union
- Manufacturer: Polikarpov
- Number built: 1

History
- First flight: 1930

The Polikarpov TB-2 (Russian: Поликарпов ТБ-2) was a Soviet heavy bomber prototype designed and tested in the 1920s. It was a sesquiplane of wooden construction, with engines mounted on the bottom wing. Work on the sole prototype began in 1927 and it was tested in 1930. Although TB-2 performance was superior to that of the Tupolev TB-1 in service at the time, it was deemed insufficient for 1930 and the project was abandoned.

== Specifications (TB-2) ==
Data from Istoriia konstruktskii samoletov v SSSR do 1938 g.

General characteristics

- Crew: 5
- Length: 17.6 m (57 ft 9 in)
- Wingspan: 27 m (88 ft 7 in)
- Wing area: 128 m^{2} (1,380 sq ft)
- Airfoil: Clark Y (16%)
- Empty weight: 4,220 kg (9,304 lb)
- Gross weight: 6,770 kg (14,925 lb)
- Powerplant: 2 × BMW VI V-12 water-cooled piston engines, 373 kW (500 hp) each
- Propellers: 2-bladed fixed-pitch propellers

Performance

- Maximum speed: 216 km/h (134 mph, 117 kn)
- Range: 1,200 km (750 mi, 650 nmi)
- Service ceiling: 6,800 m (22,300 ft)
- Time to altitude: 3,000 m (9,800 ft) in 12 minutes
- Wing loading: 53 kg/m^{2} (11 lb/sq ft)
- Power/mass: 0.110 kW/kg (0.067 hp/lb)
- Take-off run: 210 m (690 ft)
- Landing run: 180 m (590 ft)
- Horizontal turn time: 26 s
