= Pitcairn XO-61 =

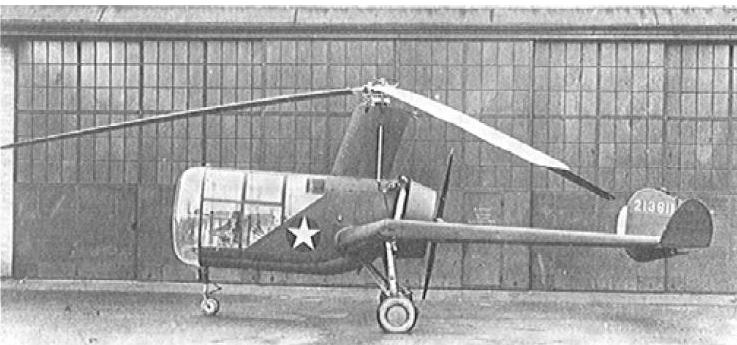

General information
- Type: Autogyro
- National origin: United States
- Manufacturer: Pitcairn Aircraft Inc
- Primary user: United States Army Air Forces

The Pitcairn XO-61 was an American autogyro designed by Pitcairn Aircraft. One of the last autogyros produced, in competition with the Kellett YO-60 and the Sikorsky R-4, it fell victim to cooling problems with its rear-mounted engine and the coming of the helicopter with its ability to hover.

Also known by the company model number PA-44 and the contract designation MX-157, the contract for the XO-61 was taken over by G&A Aircraft upon G&A's acquisition of Pitcairn Aircraft.

== See also ==
Aircraft of comparable role, configuration, and era

- Kellett YO-60
- Sikorsky R-4

Related lists

- List of helicopters
- List of military aircraft of the United States
