= Pitts Special (monoplane) =

American racing aircraft

General information
- Type: Racing monoplane
- National origin: United States
- Designer: Curtis Pitts

History
- First flight: 1948

Pitts built a monoplane racer Special in the early postwar years. Pitts also built several monoplane racing planes in the 1940s–1950s, the most famous of which was the low-winged "Pellet" of 1947 and the mid-winged Special Lil' Monster & Miss Dayton of 1951. Among other one-off projects, he also built a two-seat sport monoplane called the Big Hickey.
