= Pottier P.70 =

P.70
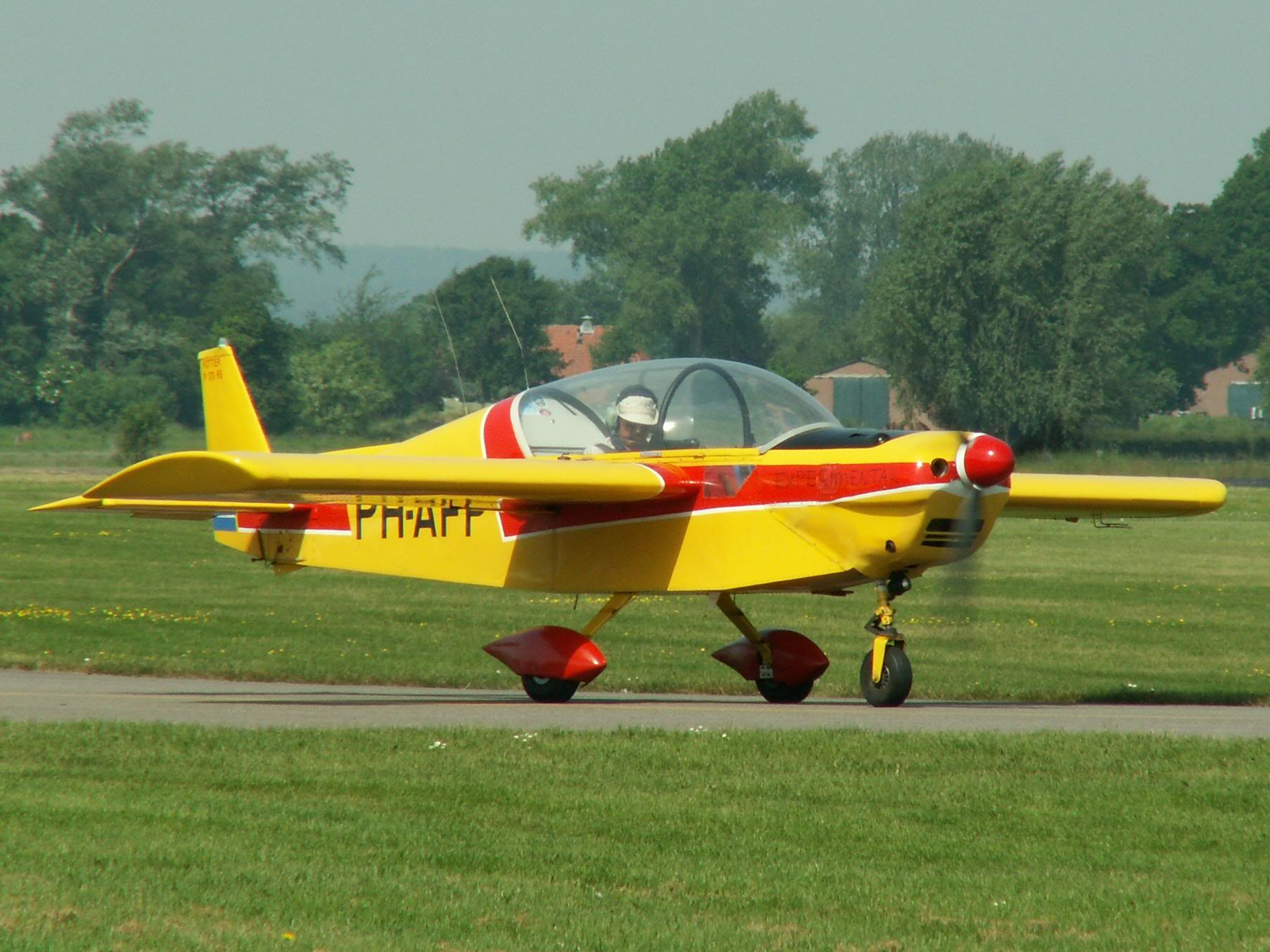
- Pottier P.170S

General information
- Type: Sport aircraft
- National origin: France
- Manufacturer: Homebuilt
- Designer: Jean Pottier

History
- First flight: 1970s

The Pottier P.70 was a single-seat, single-engine sport aircraft developed in France in the 1970s and marketed for homebuilding. It was a mid-wing cantilever monoplane of conventional design with an enclosed cockpit. Originally designed with fixed, tricycle undercarriage, the plans were later revised to offer a fixed, tailwheel option. Construction throughout was of metal. A two-seat, tandem version was developed as the P.170.

== Variants ==
- P.70B - single-seat version with tricycle undercarriage
- P.70S - single-seat version with tailwheel undercarriage
- P.170S - version with two seats in tandem and retractable tricycle undercarriage
- Besneux P.70B - The original P.70B built by Alain Besneux.

== Specifications (P.70S) ==
Data from Jane's All the World's Aircraft 1987–88 p. 588

General characteristics

- Crew: One pilot
- Length: 5.15 m (16 ft 11 in)
- Wingspan: 5.85 m (19 ft 2 in)
- Wing area: 7.2 m^{2} (78 sq ft)
- Empty weight: 215 kg (474 lb)
- Gross weight: 325 kg (716 lb)
- Powerplant: 1 × Volkswagen air-cooled engine , 30 kW (40 hp)

Performance

- Maximum speed: 180 km/h (110 mph, 96 kn)
- Range: 400 km (250 mi, 220 nmi)
- Service ceiling: 4,500 m (14,800 ft)
- Rate of climb: 0.70 m/s (150 ft/min)
