= Pilatus P-2 =

Swiss aircraft type

P-2
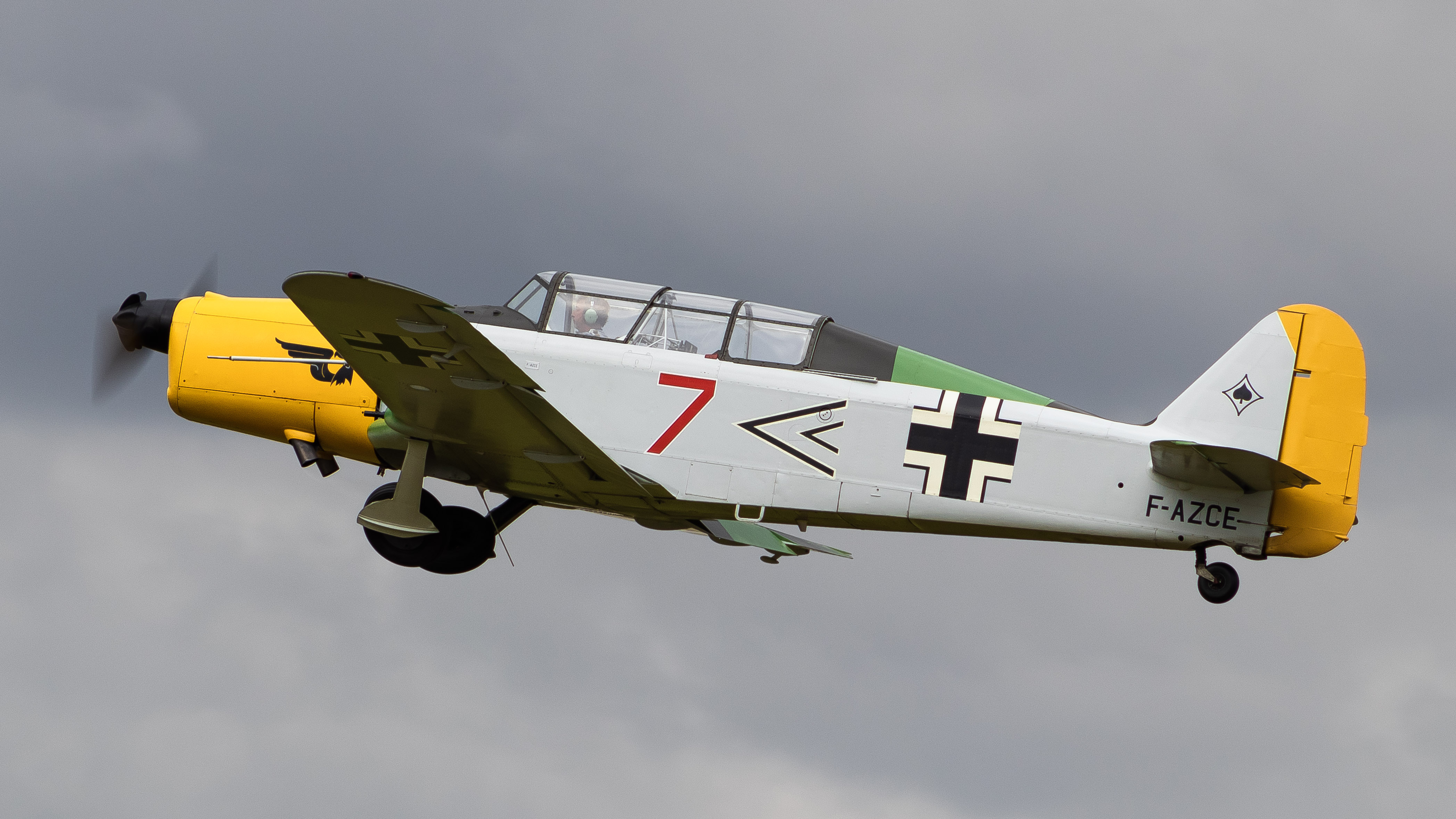
- Pilatus P2 at LFFQ Ferté Alais Airshow 2022

General information
- Type: Trainer
- National origin: Switzerland
- Manufacturer: Pilatus Aircraft
- Primary user: Swiss Air Force
- Number built: 55

History
- First flight: 27 April 1945
- Retired: 1981

The Pilatus P-2 is a trainer aircraft designed and produced by Swiss aircraft manufacturer Pilatus.

The development of the P-2 originates in the first half of the Second World War, during which time Pilatus has attempted to secured a production licence for existing Italian and German trainers before opting to design its own trainer aircraft instead. During 1943, construction of the first prototype commenced; it performed its maiden flight on 27 April 1945. A second prototype was also produced, which was subject to a formal evaluation by the Swiss Air Force before the P-2 was formally produced by the service.

The P-2 was operated by the Swiss Air Force between 1946 and 1981. The majority of the surviving aircraft were sold onto the civilian sector, where they have been often been painted in Luftwaffe markings to appear at both films and airshows alike. The P-2 is fully capable of performing aerobatic maneuvers, although its Argus As 410A-2 V-12 engine is known for being somewhat temperamental and has contributed to some incidents. Various components of the P-2 were sourced from other contemporary aircraft flown by the Swiss Air Force, such as the Messerschmitt Bf 109.

== Design and development ==
The origins of the P-2 can be traced back to the early years of Pilatus and the firm's desire to produce trainer aircraft for the Swiss Air Force. Amid the opening years of the Second World War, Pilatus had repeatedly attempted to obtain a licence to produce both Italian and German training aircraft, however, these endeavours proved to be fruitless. As an alternative, the company opted to develop its own military trainer. A key influence on the project was the Pilatus P-1, a single-seat aircraft that had been designed by the firm but never produced. By late 1943, work had progressed to the point where construction of the first prototype could commence.

The P-2 is a low-wing monoplane of mixed construction (metal, wood and fabric) with a fully retractable tailwheel undercarriage and dual control tandem seating. As an economic measure, several components were identical to existing aircraft operated by the Swiss Air Force, such as elements of the landing gear being sourced from the Messerschmitt Bf 109. There were two series of production machines, one (P-2-05) unarmed and the second (P-2-06) equipped as weapons trainers, with a machine gun above the engine and wing racks for light bombs and rockets. The aircraft is suitable for performing a variety of aerobatic maneuvers.

It is powered by a single Argus As 410A-2 V-12 inverted piston engine, which is capable of producing up to 465 hp. These engines were originally imported from neighbouring Nazi Germany. They are not considered to be particularly durable engine and have a tendency for connecting rod and piston failures. Proper operation of the Argus engine involved both delicate handling and smooth power changes, which was typical of engines designed during the 1930s.

During 1946, after the successful completion of trials using the second prototype, the Swiss Air Force placed an initial order for 26 P-2.05 aircraft. Furthermore, a second batch of twenty-five P-2.06 aircraft were produced and delivered to the Swiss Air Force between December 1949 and September 1950. The P-2 remained in service with the Swiss Air Force until 1981. The type was succeeded by the Pilatus P-3 and the Pilatus PC-7.

After the type's withdrawal from service by the Swiss Air Force, most of the surviving aircraft (roughly around 48) were sold to the civil sector. During 2008, at least 23 appeared on the national registers of Switzerland, Germany, France, the United Kingdom and the United States. They proved to be a popular civil flyer's airplane and have often appeared in Luftwaffe markings in films and airshows as an unidentified "enemy" aircraft.

== Variants ==
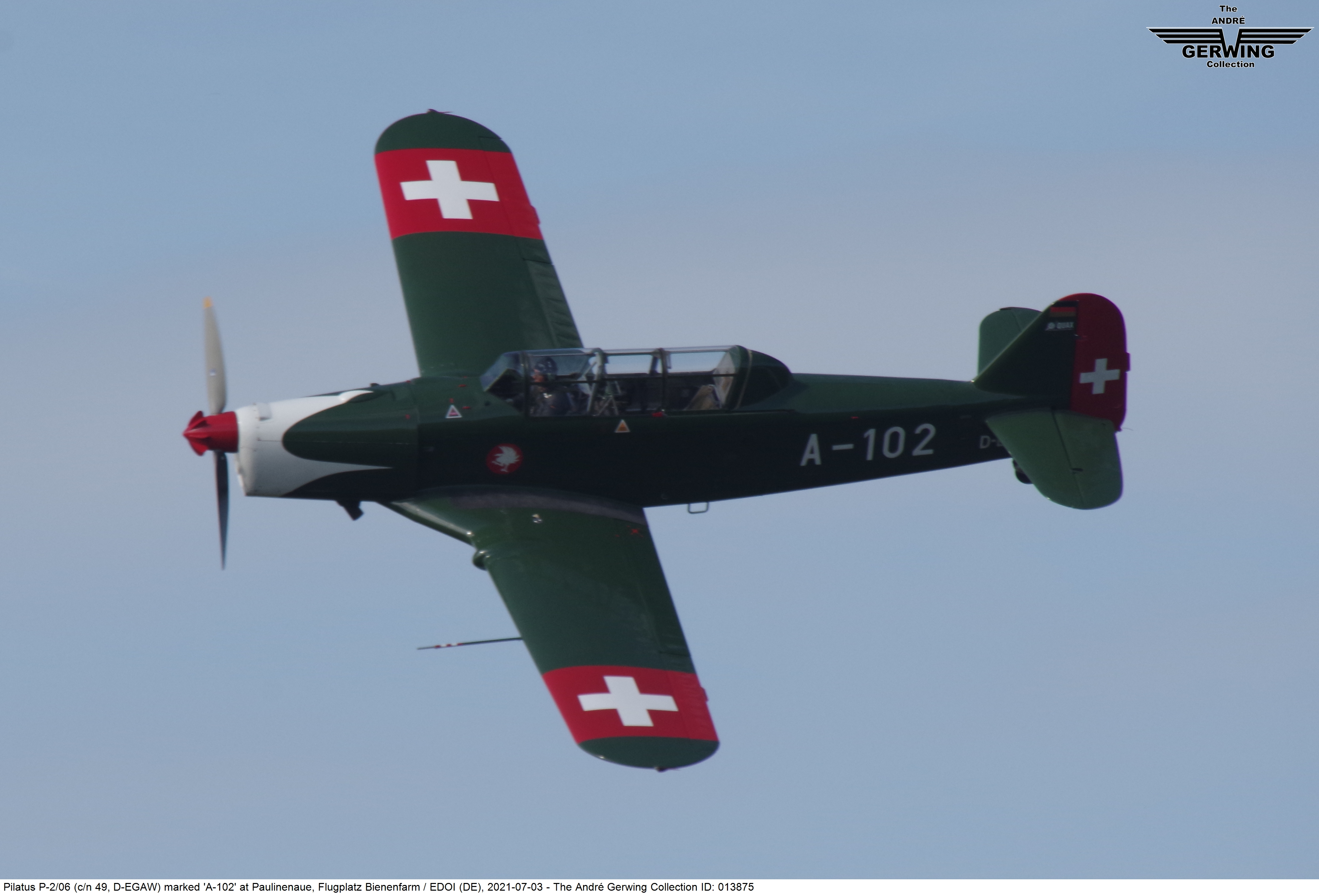
A P-2 in flight, July 2021

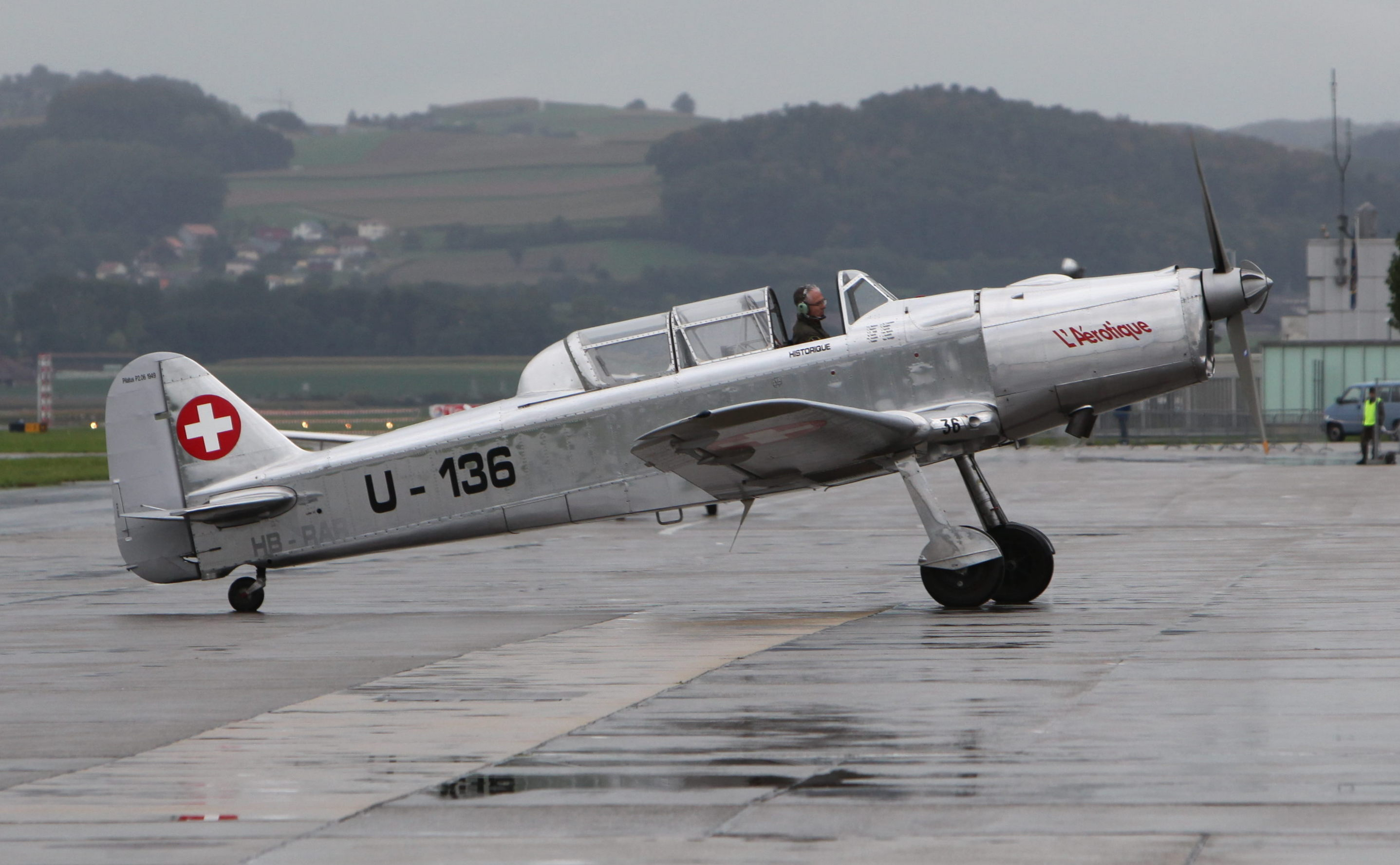
A P-2 with Swiss markings during Payerne Open Day, 2010

P-2-01
First prototype (HB-GAB/A-101/U-101), Argus-powered.

P-2-02
Non-flying static testframe.

P-2-03
Hispano-Suiza HS-12Mb upright V water-cooled engined prototype. Large ventral radiator.

P-2-04

Armed version of P-2-03.

P-2-05
Production version of unarmed machine, Argus motor. 26 delivered to Swiss AF.

P-2-06
Production version of armed machine, Argus motor. 26 delivered to Swiss AF.

== Operators ==
Haiti

- Haitian Air Force

Switzerland

- Swiss Air Force

== Specifications (P-2) ==
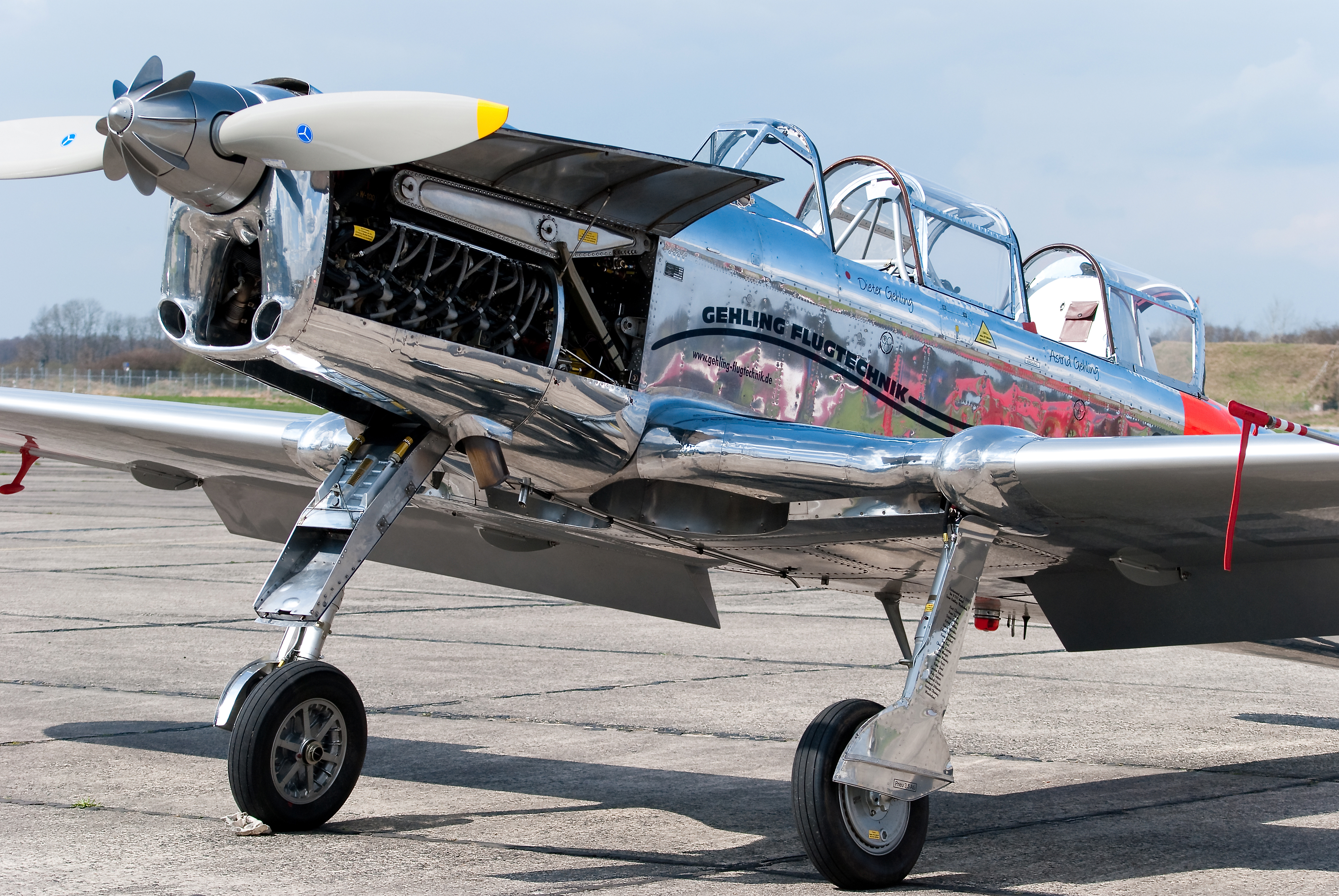
Forward section of a P-2 with the inline engine exposed

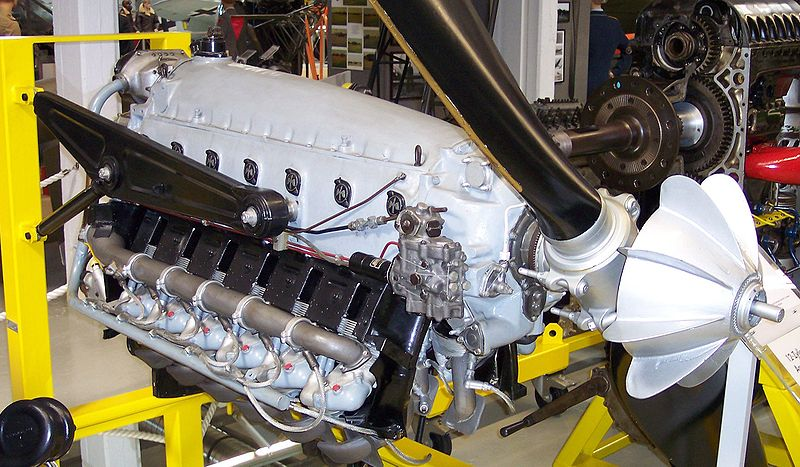
An Argus As 410A-2 V-12 inverted piston engine

Data from Jane's All the World's Aircraft 1951–52

General characteristics

- Crew: 2
- Length: 9.07 m (29 ft 9 in)
- Wingspan: 11 m (36 ft 1 in)
- Height: 2.70 m (8 ft 10 in)
- Wing area: 17.0 m^{2} (183 sq ft)
- Aspect ratio: 7.1:1
- Fuel capacity: 225 L (59 US gal; 49 imp gal) in three tanks
- Powerplant: 1 × Argus As 410A-2 V-12 inverted air-cooled piston engine, 280 kW (370 hp) rated at 2,000 m (6,600 ft) ; 347 kW (465 hp) for take-off
- Propellers: 2-bladed Argus constant-speed propeller

Performance

- Maximum speed: 340 km/h (210 mph, 180 kn) at 2,500 m (8,200 ft)
- Cruise speed: 332 km/h (206 mph, 179 kn) maximum at 3,300 m (10,800 ft)
- Economical cruising speed: 306 km/h (190 mph; 165 kn) at 4,500 m (14,800 ft)
- Landing speed: 105 km/h (65 mph; 57 kn)
- Never exceed speed: 720 km/h (450 mph, 390 kn)
- Range: 865 km (537 mi, 467 nmi) in still air at Economical cruising speed with full fuel
- Rate of climb: 6.5 m/s (1,280 ft/min)
- Take-off run: 231 m (758 ft) from grass
- Landing run: 157 m (515 ft) on grass

== See also ==
Related development

- Pilatus P-1
