= Studienbüro für Spezialflugzeuge SB-5 =

Swiss high-wing civil utility aircraft

SB-5
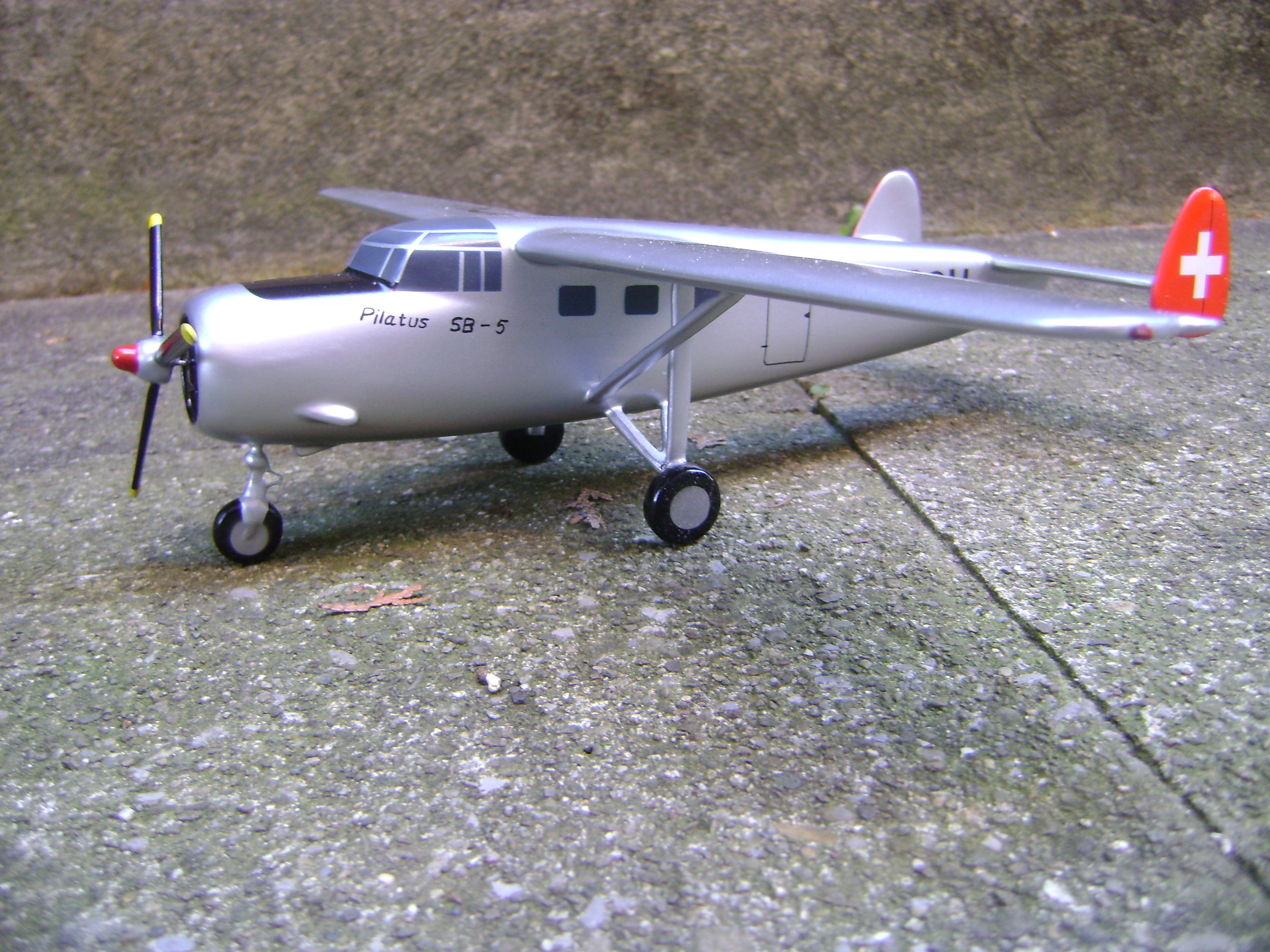
- A model of the proposed SB-5

General information
- Type: Civil utility aircraft
- National origin: Switzerland
- Designer: Studienbüro für Spezialflugzeuge Belart (Designer)

History
- Developed from: Pilatus SB-2 Pelican

The SB-5 was a study for a civil utility aircraft by the Studienbüro für Spezialflugzeuge at the ETH Zurich department of aircraft statics and aircraft construction.

== Background ==
In November 1940, the design of the SB-2, designed by the same office, was proposed to its client the Swiss Federal Office of Civil Aviation which was at the time seeking a test aircraft to evaluate criteria for airfields in mountain valleys. Thus the desired aircraft would be a low-speed aircraft with STOL (Short Take-Off and Landing) performance, as well as very good climbing performance. It was not until May 1944, that the SB-2 first flew.

The SB-5 was a study for an enlarged version of the SB-2. According to the reports of the Studienbüro delivered to the Schweizerische Flugteschnische Vereinigung, whom the Studienbüro was subordinated, design commenced in the first quarter of 1944 and was last mentioned in the first quarter of 1945 as being terminated.

The SB-5 was to be a single-engine high wing monoplane with a fixed nosewheel with a light-alloy semi-monocoque fuselage shell, accommodating 9 passengers in 3 rows of three, with an optional passenger in the co-pilots seat. Power was to have been supplied "possibly" by a Wright Cyclone driving a 3-bladed propeller.

== Specification ==
Data from

General characteristics

- Crew: 1–2
- Capacity: 9–10
- Wingspan: 22 m (72 ft 2 in)
- Wing area: 55 m^{2} (590 sq ft)
- Max takeoff weight: 5,000 kg (11,023 lb)
- Powerplant: 1 × Wright R-1820 Cyclone ("possibly" according to the only source) 9-cylinder air-cooled radial piston engine, 750–890 kW (1,000–1,200 hp)
- Propellers: 3-bladed Escher-Wyss constant-speed reversible-pitch propeller (likely, but source fails to mention)

Performance

- Maximum speed: 250 km/h (160 mph, 130 kn)

== "SB" projects ==
SB-1
Intended as a pure experimental aircraft, commercial use was not planned.
SB-2
The only SB project to be built and flown.

- (Nothing is known about any designs with the names SB-3 and SB-4).
