= P3 Flyers =

- P3 Flyers logo
- Active: 2002–present
- Country: Switzerland
- Type: Civilian aerobatic display team
- Website: Official homepage

Aircraft flown
- Trainer: Pilatus P-3

The P3 Flyers are a civil aviation team flying Pilatus P-3 demonstrations in Europe.

== History ==
The team has Pilatus P-3 aircraft used earlier by the Swiss Air Force. The first Pilatus P-3 was purchased in 1992, the team's debut was in 1996 with two aircraft. In 2001 was the first official show with three aircraft. In the first years, simple flights were shown at airshows with 2 -3 aircraft. However, soon came the desire to show a program with different flight figures. Thus, in 2004, a fourth aircraft was added and the team got a license from the Federal Office of Civil Aviation (FOCA) for aerobatic demonstrations. This entitlement is granted each year by the FOCA, after a 3-day training in spring. In 2006, the 5th aircraft was added, making more complex choreographies and additional elements possible. Since 2007, all five aircraft have been equipped with a smoke system . The P3 flyers fly during the summer months in Switzerland and the rest of Europe.
