= Pilatus P-4 =

P-4
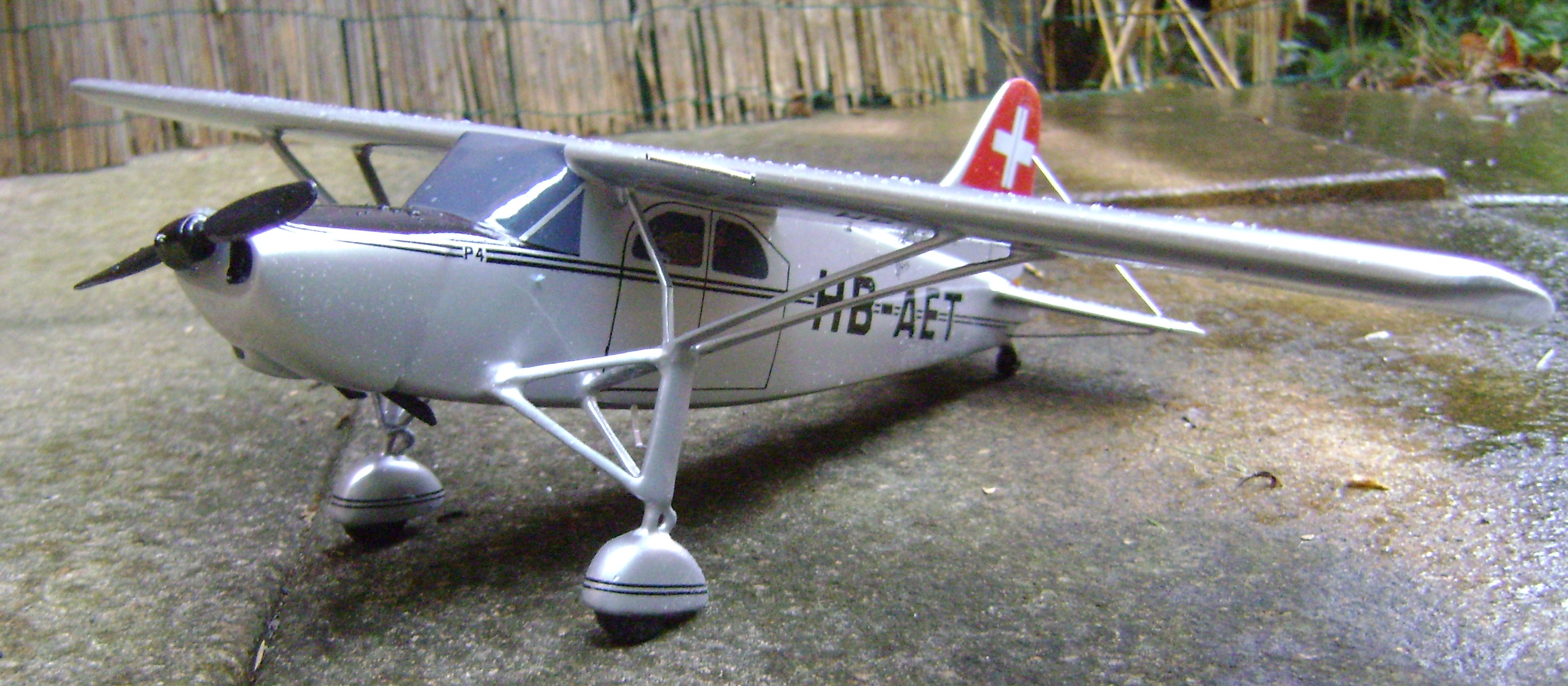
- Model of the Pilatus P-4

General information
- Type: Five-seat cabin monoplane
- National origin: Switzerland
- Manufacturer: Pilatus
- Status: Cancelled
- Number built: 1

History
- First flight: 1948
- Retired: 1957

The Pilatus P-4 was a Swiss five-seat cabin monoplane designed and built by Pilatus.The monoplane had little sales success.

== Design and development ==
The P-4 was not designed specifically as a passenger aircraft but rather as a versatile working aircraft. The aim was to build a robust aircraft with good slow-flying handling, requiring only short takeoff and landing runs and little maintenance.

The P-4 was a high-wing monoplane with a fixed tailwheel undercarriage. The aircraft's fuselage was of fabric-covered steel-tube construction; the wing, which was braced to the fuselage by steel V-struts, was of wooden construction. It was powered by a 190 hp (140 kW) Lycoming GO-435 engine (later replaced by a 240 hp (180 kW) GO-435-C2a) driving a two-bladed variable-pitch propeller. Its enclosed cabin could accommodate a pilot and four passengers, with the provision for carrying two stretchers, photographic equipment or crop spraying equipment. Alternative ski or float undercarriages could be fitted.

The prototype P-4, aircraft registration HB-AET, took off for its maiden flight on 22 March 1948. Although the aircraft was exhibited at the 1949 Paris Air Show, it did not enter production owing to a lack of production capacity because Pilatus were busy refurbishing the Swiss Air Force's P-51 Mustang fighters and later, license-building de Havilland Venom jet fighters.

On 13 October 1957, the P-4 crashed in the Susten Pass region while on an exercise with the Swiss Air Rescue Service and was completely written off. Pilatus Aircraft Ltd. had always owned the P-4 until that time.

== Specifications (P-4) ==
Data from Jane's All The World's Aircraft 1951–52

General characteristics

- Crew: one
- Capacity: four passengers
- Length: 8.6 m (28 ft 3 in)
- Wingspan: 11.85 m (38 ft 11 in)
- Height: 2.5 m (8 ft 2 in)
- Wing area: 20.9 m^{2} (225 sq ft)
- Empty weight: 910 kg (2,006 lb)
- Gross weight: 1,500 kg (3,307 lb)
- Fuel capacity: 230 L (61 US gal; 51 imp gal)
- Powerplant: 1 × Lycoming O-435 , 140 kW (190 hp)

Performance

- Maximum speed: 245 km/h (152 mph, 132 kn)
- Cruise speed: 152 km/h (94 mph, 82 kn)
- Range: 1,000 km (620 mi, 540 nmi)
- Service ceiling: 5,000 m (16,000 ft)
- Rate of climb: 4.5 m/s (890 ft/min)
