= LIBIS KB-11 =

KB-11 Branko
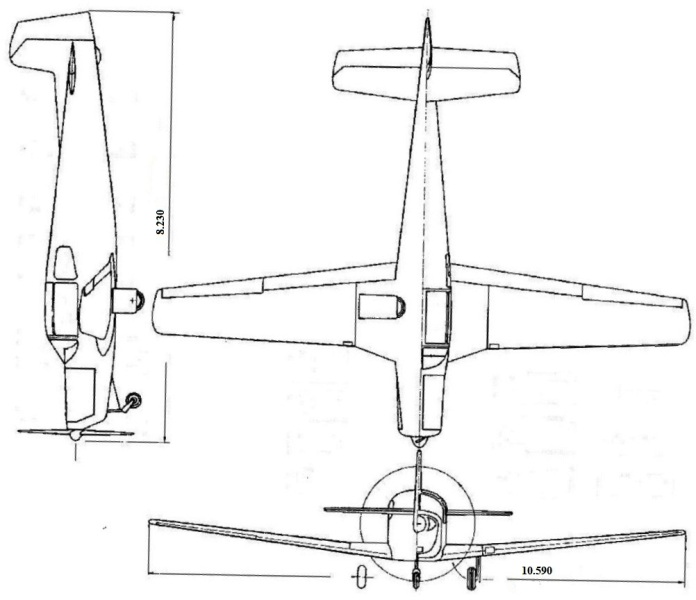

General information
- Type: Four-seat light trainer and tourer
- Manufacturer: LIBIS aircraft (Letalski inštitut Branko Ivanuš Slovenija)

History
- First flight: 1959

The LIBIS KB-11 Branko was a 1950s Slovenian four-seat monoplane designed and produced by LIBIS aircraft during Yugoslavian period.

== Design and development ==
The aircraft design office of the LIBIS aircraft (Letalski Inštitut Branko Ivanuš Slovenija) brought together teachers and students of the Ljubljana technical high school. The KB-11 Branko was a development of the earlier two-seat KB-6 Matajur. First flown in December 1959 the KB-11 was an all-metal cantilever low-wing monoplane with retractable tricycle landing gear and an enclosed heated and ventilated cockpit for four persons. It was intended for use as an air-taxi or for business use but only small numbers were built.

== Specifications (KB-11) ==
Data from Observer's Book of Aircraft 1962

General characteristics

- Crew: 1
- Capacity: 4 total
- Length: 8.23 m (27 ft 0 in)
- Wingspan: 10.59 m (34 ft 9 in)
- Height: 2.45 m (8 ft 0 in)
- Wing area: 1.152 m^{2} (12.40 sq ft)
- Aspect ratio: 7.76:1
- Airfoil: NACA 3415 at root, USA 35B at tip
- Empty weight: 800 kg (1,764 lb)
- Gross weight: 1,250 kg (2,756 lb) normal loaded without tip tanks
- Powerplant: 1 × Lycoming O-435-1 6-cylinder horizontally opposed, 138 kW (185 hp)

Performance

- Maximum speed: 214 km/h (133 mph, 116 kn) at sea level
- Cruise speed: 171 km/h (106 mph, 92 kn) at 1,525 m (5,000 ft) and 75% power
- Stall speed: 98 km/h (61 mph, 53 kn)
- Range: 950 km (590 mi, 510 nmi)
- Service ceiling: 5,300 m (17,500 ft)
- Rate of climb: 4.3 m/s (850 ft/min)
