= Pilatus Aircraft =

Aircraft manufacturer located in Switzerland

Coordinates: 46°58′33″N 8°22′53″E

- Industry: Aerospace
- Founded: 16 December 1939
- Headquarters: Stans (Nidwalden), Switzerland
- Key people: Markus Bucher (CEO); Hansueli Loosli (Chairman)
- Products: Fixed-wing aircraft
- Revenue: $1.07 billion 2018
- Net income: $154.5 million 2018
- Number of employees: 3,000 (August 2025)
- Parent: Oerlikon-Bührle (1939–2000)
- Website: www.pilatus-aircraft.com

Pilatus Aircraft Ltd. is an aerospace manufacturer located in Stans, Switzerland. In August 2025, the company employed around 3,000 people.

The company has mostly produced aircraft for niche markets, in particular short takeoff and landing (STOL) aircraft as well as military training aircraft. During the 1950s and 1960s, Pilatus developed a short takeoff and landing (STOL) light civil transport aircraft, the PC-6 Porter. In 1973, it was decided to restart work on a turbine version of the piston engine trainer P-3, which entered production as the PC-7 Turbo Trainer. In 1979, Pilatus acquired Britten-Norman, manufacturer of the Britten-Norman Islander and Britten-Norman Defender aircraft. During the 1980s, it developed the PC-9, an improved derivative of the PC-7.

During the 1990s, Pilatus opened up a broader civilian market with the introduction of the PC-12, a single-engine turboprop aircraft and has delivered 1,800 as of April 2021. In the 2000s, it also introduced a new member family of its military training aircraft, the turboprop-powered PC-21. During the 2010s, the company developed the PC-24, a twin-engined STOL jet aircraft capable of operating from unpaved runways.

== History ==
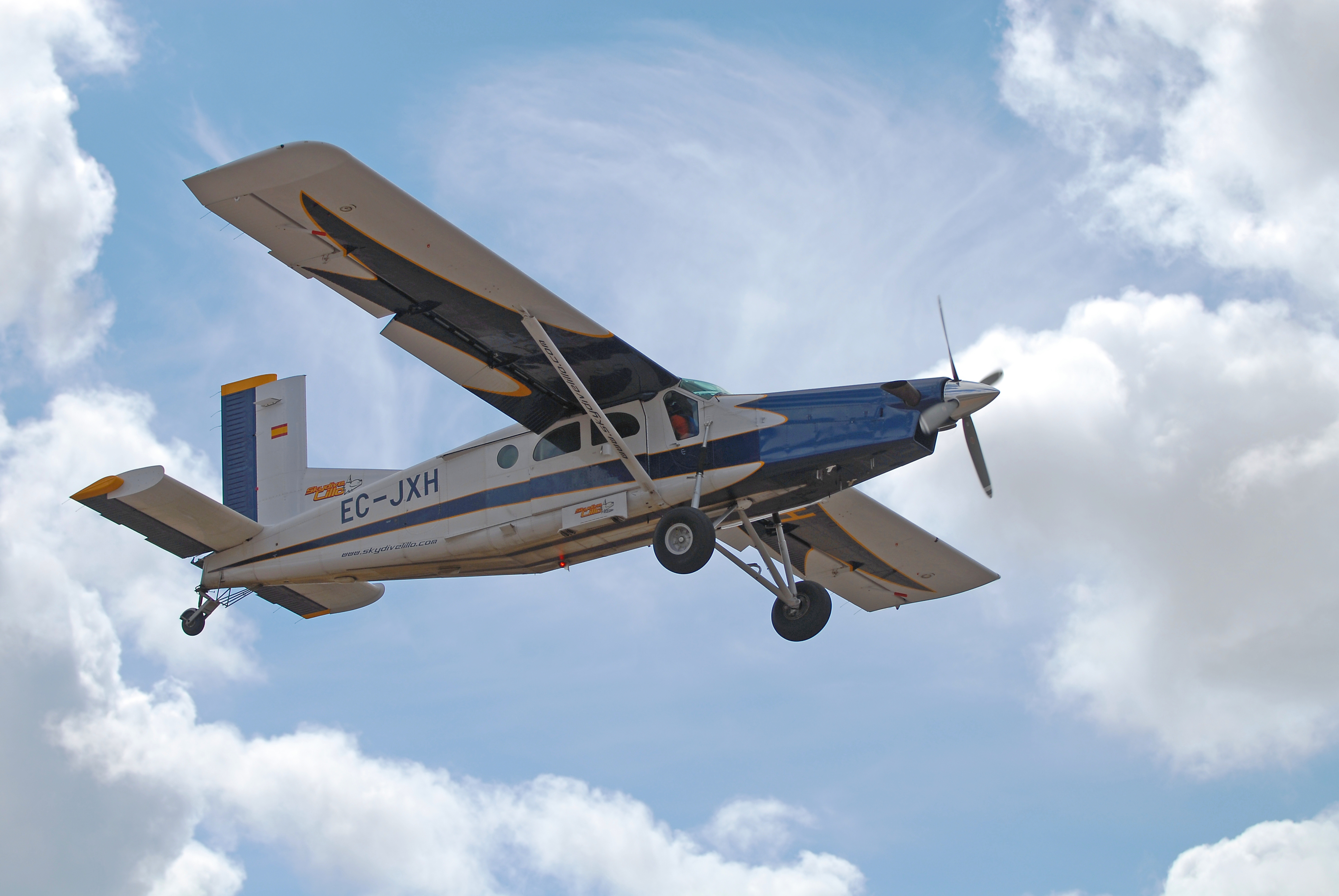
The PC-6 Porter was the first Pilatus aircraft to achieve widespread international success.

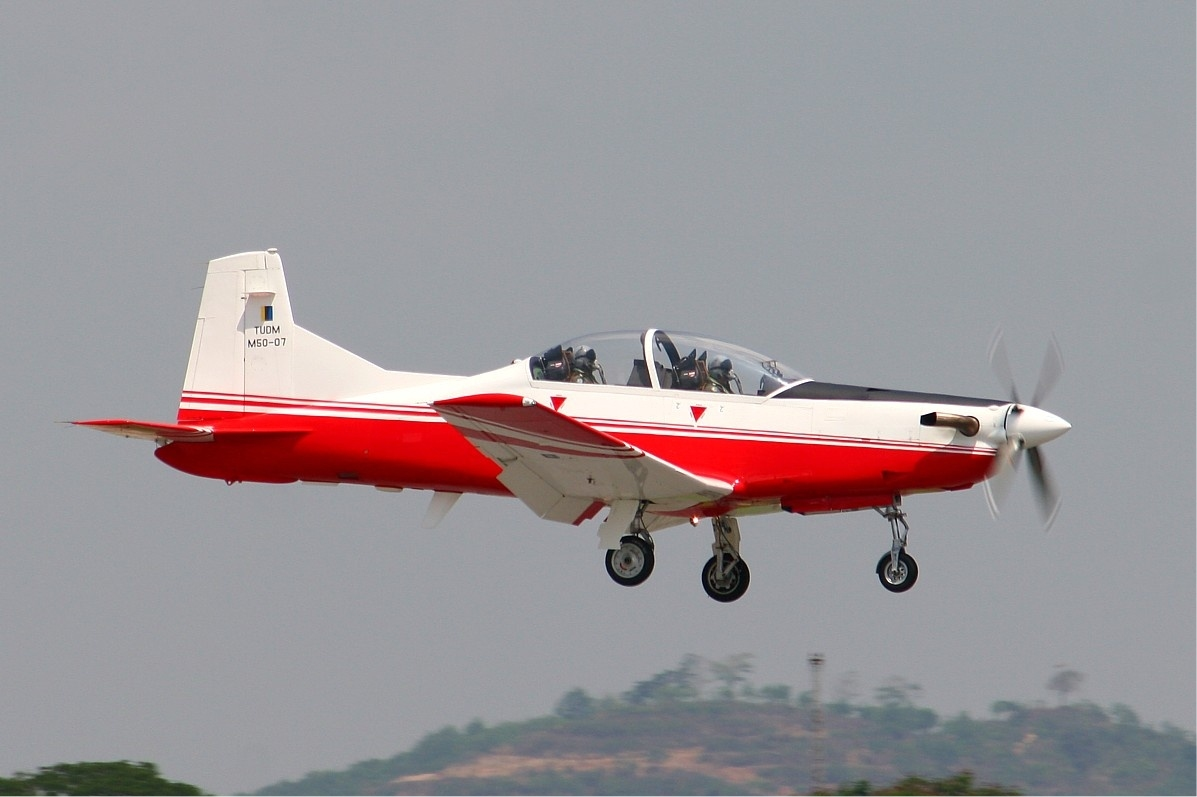
A Royal Malaysian Air Force Pilatus PC-7 Mk2

=== 1939–1949 ===
In August 1938 Vickers offered Spitfire aircraft to the Swiss Kriegstechnische Abteilung (KTA). Antoine Gazda, working as a sales manager for the Werkzeugmaschinenfabrik Oerlikon, negotiated a licence agreement with Vickers and offered swiss-built Spitfires to the Flugwaffe. On October 21, 1938, a society named «Studiengesellschaft zur Gründung einer Flugzeugfabrik AG» was founded and designated the future company to be located at Stans. However the authorities decided to buy complete aircraft from Messerschmitt in Germany. Without the now obsolete «Studiengesellschaft», Emil Bührle and Gazda continued on the project and founded the Pilatus Flugzeugwerke AG with the help of Elektrobank on December 16, 1939. Construction of a production building started in March 1940. After forming, the company obtained contracts to do maintenance and repairs for the Swiss Air Force. The first venture of the new company was the assembly of EKW C-35 reconnaissance biplanes from spare parts, along with overhaul work on other types.

The first company proposal to the Swiss Air Force was a single-seat trainer, designated the P-1, although no records exist of the work done on it and not even the name of the project was ever mentioned on the two drawings that were discovered in the federal archives. The next project was the detail construction of the SB-2 Pelican which had been designed by the Swiss Federal Institute of Technology. The five-seat experimental aircraft first flew on 30 May 1944 and only one of the type was built - resulting in a financial loss for the company that was higher than what it was ever paid for.

In 1942, the company won a contract from the Swiss military to modify 33 EKW C-3603. Following on from the abandoned P-1 design, the company started again on the development of a two-seat trainer, designated the P-2. The P-2 first flew on 27 April 1945, and the company won an order for the Swiss Air Force.

During 1945, the company produced a prototype single-engined light transport, designated the P-4. It made its first flight on 22 March 1948, but only one P-4 was ultimately completed. During the late 1940s, the company produced a number of wooden glider designs, and also handled the production of fuselages and tail-booms for the licence-produced De Havilland Vampire and Venom.

=== 1950–1959 ===
During 1951, the company worked on the P-5, a design project for an artillery observation aircraft, but it was not built. The P-3 was put into quantity production for the Swiss Air Force, and the company also achieved its first export success with the type: an order for six P-3s by the Brazilian Navy.

During 1958, Pilatus began design work on a short takeoff and landing (STOL) light civil transport aircraft which emerged as the PC-6 Porter; this aircraft first flew on 4 May 1959. The Porter was also manufactured under license by Fairchild Hiller in the United States. Roughly 100 of these licence-produced aircraft would be completed, being mainly purchased by civil operators within the US.

=== 1960–1969 ===
The initial turbine-powered models of the PC-6 were equipped with the Astazou II powerplant, however complaints of the reliability of this engine were made. Another early turboprop powerplant that became available for the PC-6 was the Garrett Air Research TPE 331. Some operators such as Air America chose to retrofit their Astazou II-powered PC-6s with the TPE 331 engine in its place. Both the piston and turbine-engine versions of the PC-6 became quickly known for their Short Takeoff and Landing (STOL) capabilities, requiring only a very short takeoff run before being ready for rotation prior to taking off.

Furthermore, during 1965, a twin-engined variant of the PC-6 was built as the PC-8 Twin Porter, although it first flew on 15 November 1967, the aircraft remained an experimental and one-off type, and development was stopped in 1972. Another project, the PC-10, a 16-passenger twin-engined transport, was also kicked off by the company; however, it was not ultimately put into production.

In 1966, a turboprop-powered variant of the P-3 was flown, and was designated the PC-7. This aircraft was lost in a crash, leading to development of the type being put on hold until the 1970s. The termination of work was reportedly driven by a lack of market interest at that time.

=== 1970–1979 ===
In a departure from the production of trainers and Porters, the company bought the rights to the all-metal B-4 glider; Pilatus re-designed the B-4 for easier production and redesignated at the B-4/PC-11. The PC-11 first flew on 5 May 1972 and the company went on to build 322.

During 1973, it was decided to restart work on the PC-7 programme; factors for its revival had included the 1973 oil crisis, the launch of the rival Beechcraft T-34C Turbo-Mentor, and the increasing age of existing trainer aircraft. In 1975, a further PC-7 prototype was flown; following further development, it entered production as the PC-7 Turbo Trainer. On 12 August 1978, the first production standard aircraft made its first flight; on 5 December of that year, Switzerland's Federal Office of Civil Aviation (FOCA) issued civil certification for the PC-7. Over time, sales of the PC-7 generated considerable profits, allowing the company to finance the development of further types of aircraft.

In 1979, Pilatus acquired Britten-Norman, constructor of the Britten-Norman Islander and Britten-Norman Defender aircraft; this move led to the business being restructured as the Pilatus Britten-Norman company. Shortly thereafter, production activity on the Islander/Defender family was transferred to its Bembridge. Under the new company's direction, new features were installed upon the Islander over the years, such as the fitting of silencers upon both the aircraft's engine and propellers to better facilitate operations in noise-sensitive environments.

=== 1980–1989 ===
During 1982, development of an improved variant of the PC-7 was started, it emerged as the Pilatus PC-9 in 1984. It retained the overall layout of its predecessor, but the aircraft had very little structural commonality with it. Amongst other improvements, the PC-9 features a larger cockpit with stepped ejection seats and also has a ventral airbrake. Certification was achieved in September 1985.

Development of what was to become the company's best selling type, the Pilatus PC-12, was started in 1987, a single-engined turboprop transport that could carry up to twelve passengers or freight. In October 1989, Pilatus announced the development of the PC-12 at the annual convention of the National Business Aviation Association (NBAA).

=== 1990–1999 ===
The prototype PC-12 was flown on 31 May 1991. On 30 March 1994, the Swiss Federal Office of Civil Aviation issued the type certificate for the PC-12; The first PC-12 Eagle surveillance aircraft was built in 1995, further developments led to the PC-12 Spectre; amongst other customers, it was adopted by the United States Air Force as the U-28A. Since entering service, Pilatus developed a large number of improvements and options upon the original PC-12 model; changes include increases in the maximum takeoff weight, the use of increasingly powerful engines, the adoption of new avionics, noise-reduction measures, new propellers, speed and range increases, additional interiors and new inflight entertainment systems.

During 1997, TSA Transairco SA of Geneva was acquired by Pilatus. In 1998, Pilatus Australia Pty Ltd was established, while Britten-Norman was sold.

=== 2000–2009 ===
To further its family of military training aircraft, the turboprop PC-21 was developed and first flown in 2002. A key aim for the PC-21 was to allow jet aircraft pilots to perform the majority of their training using the type before converting to jet-powered types, allowing operators to make substantial savings. In order to achieve this aim, the new trainer was required to have an expanded performance envelope in terms of aerodynamics, cockpit equipment, flexibility, and ease of maintenance. In May 2002, Pilatus announced that it aimed for the PC-21 to capture 50% of the global trainer aircraft market between 2005 and 2030.

In December 2000, the owners Unaxis (previously called Oerlikon-Bührle) sold Pilatus to a consortium of Swiss investors. During July 2010, the company delivered its 1,000 PC-12.

=== 2010–2019 ===
In 2013, Pilatus created a new overseas entity, Pilatus Aircraft Industry (China) Co., Ltd, to manufacture both the PC-6 and PC-12 aircraft in Chongqing, China; this company was run as a joint partnership between Pilatus and Beijing Tian Xing Jian Yu Science Co., Ltd. In 2014, the majority of PC-6s delivered that year were to Chinese customers. By April 2016, around 20 PC-6s were in operation in the Chinese market; the type has often been used to replace the Antonov An-2, being reportedly cheaper to operate.

The PC-24 was designed based on feedback from PC-12 customers, who desired increased range and speed, but wanted to retain the PC-12's ability to use very short runways. The design program was first mentioned by Pilatus in its May 2011 annual report. On 21 May 2013, the PC-24 was introduced to the public at the European Business Aviation Convention & Exhibition (EBACE) in Geneva. At the event, the then Pilatus chairman Oscar Schwenk claimed the PC-24 did not fit into any existing business jet categories, and stated that the aircraft was the only one that combined "...the versatility of a turboprop with the cabin size of a medium light jet, and the performance of a light jet". The rollout of the first PC-24, HB-VXA, was on 1 August 2014, Switzerland's national day; the aircraft's first flight was on 11 May 2015.

During 2018, Pilatus' general aviation division delivered 128 aircraft: 80 PC-12s, 27 PC-21s, 3 PC-6s and 18 PC-24s and its revenue was 1.1 billion Swiss francs (SFr.) ($1.0 billion) while order intake for the year was $980 million, boosting the company’s backlog to $2.07 billion. That same year, the company announced the closure of the orderbook for the PC-6 during summer 2018; the last example of the type was completed during early 2019 while parts production is set to continue for at least 20 years.

At the end of 2019, Pilatus recorded revenues of Sfr1.2 billion, which was principally generated via the delivery of 134 aircraft: 40 PC-24s, 83 PC-12NGs, and 11 PC-21s. This compared with revenues of SFr1.1 billion in 2018 on deliveries of 128 aircraft: 18 PC-24s, 80 PC-12NGs, 27 PC-21s and three PC-6s. As of May 2020, the company's backlog stood at $2.1 billion.

=== 2025 ===
In early August 2025, with the 39% tariffs in the second Trump administration on Swiss products, Pilatus could not compensate for the competitive disadvantage and announced it would stop all exports to the United States.

== Aircraft ==
Name	Description
Pilatus SB-2	1941; STOL transporter, only 1 aircraft
Pilatus P-1	1941; Single-seat trainer, project only
Pilatus P-2	1945; Trainer
Pilatus P-3	1953; Trainer
Pilatus P-4	1948; STOL transporter, 1 prototype only
Pilatus P-5	1951 artillery observation aircraft, project only
Pilatus PC-6	1959; STOL transporter
Pilatus PC-7	1966; Turboprop trainer
Pilatus PC-8D	1967; STOL transporter, only 1 prototype
Pilatus PC-9	1984; Turboprop trainer
Pilatus PC-10	1970; Twin-engined transporter, project only
Pilatus B-4	1972; Sailplane given Pilatus project number PC-11
Pilatus PC-12	1991; Single-engined transport/business turboprop
Pilatus PC-21	2001; Turboprop trainer
Pilatus PC-24	2014; Twin-engined transport/business jet

== Locations ==
Pilatus Aircraft has its headquarters, along with a production plant, on the Buochs Airport in the Swiss canton of Nidwalden. The headquarters and plant are in the municipality of Stans.

The company's wartime founding called for a location far from Switzerland's borders and right up against a ridge of Mount Pilatus. Original plans actually called for the factory to be built inside the mountain.

Besides its day-to-day role as an aircraft factory, the Stans plant is perhaps best known for its use as a location for the film Goldfinger, particularly the exterior shots in which James Bond crashes his DB5 and is captured.

Besides its Stans plant, the Pilatus Group has operations in Adelaide, South Australia and in Broomfield, Colorado.

== Controversies ==
=== Violation of Swiss Arms Export Law ===
In 2019, the Swiss Federal Department of Foreign Affairs (FDFA) launched an investigation into the company for providing logistical support and maintenance services to military aircraft in Saudi Arabia and the United Arab Emirate, both involved in the war in Yemen. Pilatus Aircraft’s support of military operations in Saudi Arabia and the UAE was deemed a breach of Swiss export laws, which prohibit aiding military activities in countries involved in ongoing conflicts. In June 2019, the FDFA ordered Pilatus to halt its operations in both countries. Pilatus Aircraft appealed the decision. In 2021, the decision of the FDFA was annulled by the Federal Administrative Court based on "incompatibility with the [Swiss] government's foreign policy objectives"

=== Indian Bribery case ===
Pilatus Aircraft was implicated in a bribery scandal in India. In 2019, the Indian Central Bureau of Investigation launched an investigation into alleged corruption involving the sale of 75 PC-7 MkII trainer aircraft to the Indian Air Force. The $350 million deal, signed in 2012, was reportedly tainted by bribes paid to Indian officials to secure the contract.

Pilatus was accused of violating India’s Prevention of Corruption Act, with investigations revealing financial transfers to intermediaries and consultants allegedly involved in facilitating the deal. Indian authorities, as part of the inquiry, scrutinized the involvement of middlemen including notorious arms dealer Sanjay Bhandari, who would have received $50 million through the Dubai branch of Offset India Solutions Private Limited. Pilatus refused to comment and India scrapped a contract to purchase a further 38 aircraft from the Swiss manufacturer.
