= Pilatus P-3 =

Swiss training aircraft

P-3
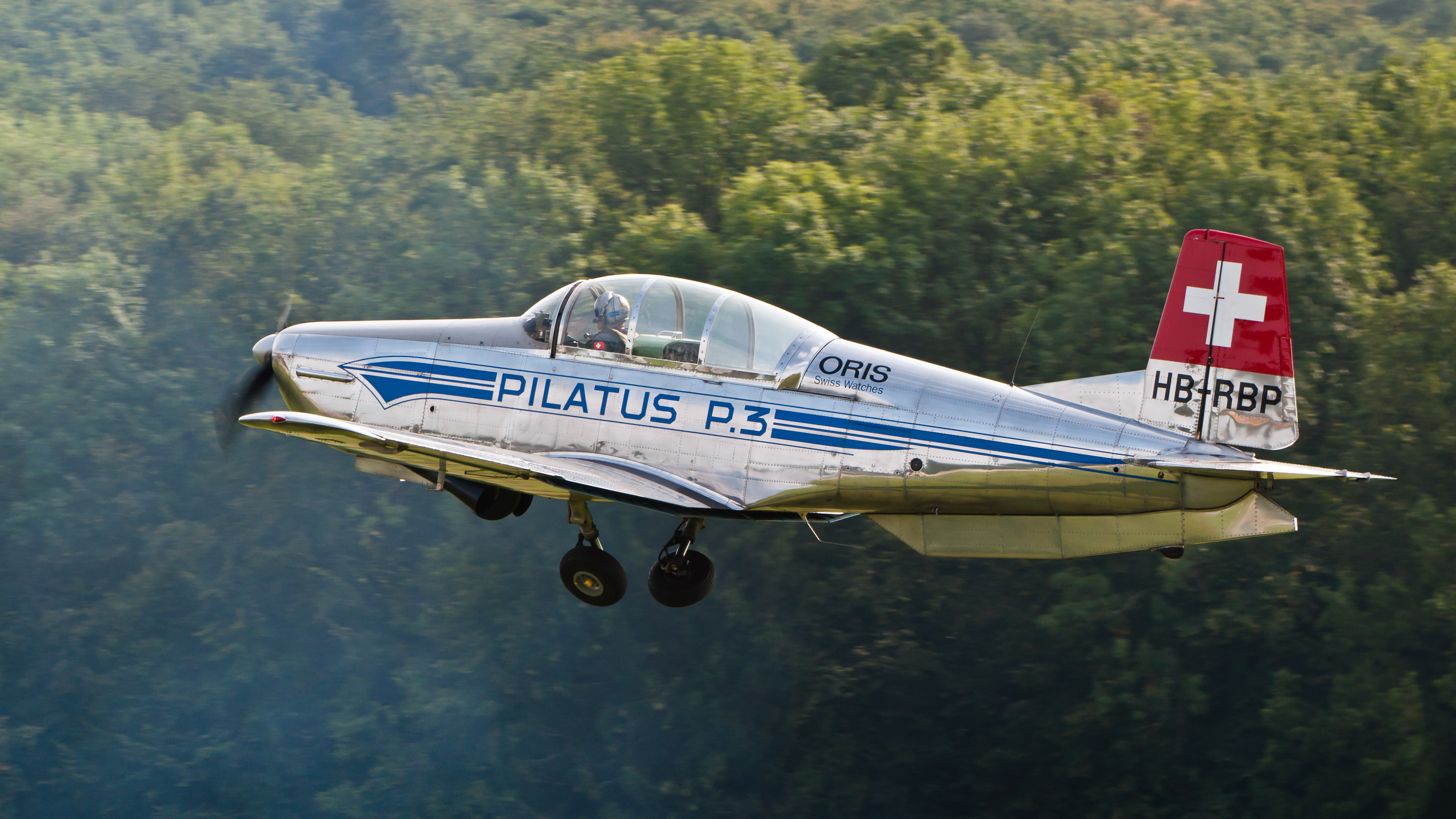

General information
- Type: Trainer aircraft
- Manufacturer: Pilatus Aircraft
- Status: in use in private hands
- Primary users: Swiss Air Force Brazilian Navy
- Number built: 80 (Note: The variant production figures give a total of 80 aircraft: one P-3-01 prototype, one P-3-02 military prototype, 12 P-3-03s, six P-3-04s and 60 P-3-05s.)

History
- Introduction date: 1956
- First flight: 3 September 1953
- Developed into: Pilatus PC-7

The Pilatus P-3 was a military training aircraft built by Pilatus Aircraft of Switzerland.

== Design and development ==
The Pilatus P-3 was designed for primary and advanced training (including night flying, aerobatics and instrument flying). The military versions were designated P-3-03 to P-3-05. It was of all-metal construction with a retractable tricycle undercarriage and tandem seating. There was provision for underwing racks for light practice bombs or rockets and a machine gun in a pod below the port wing. Although such kits were purchased, they were never used.

== Operational history ==
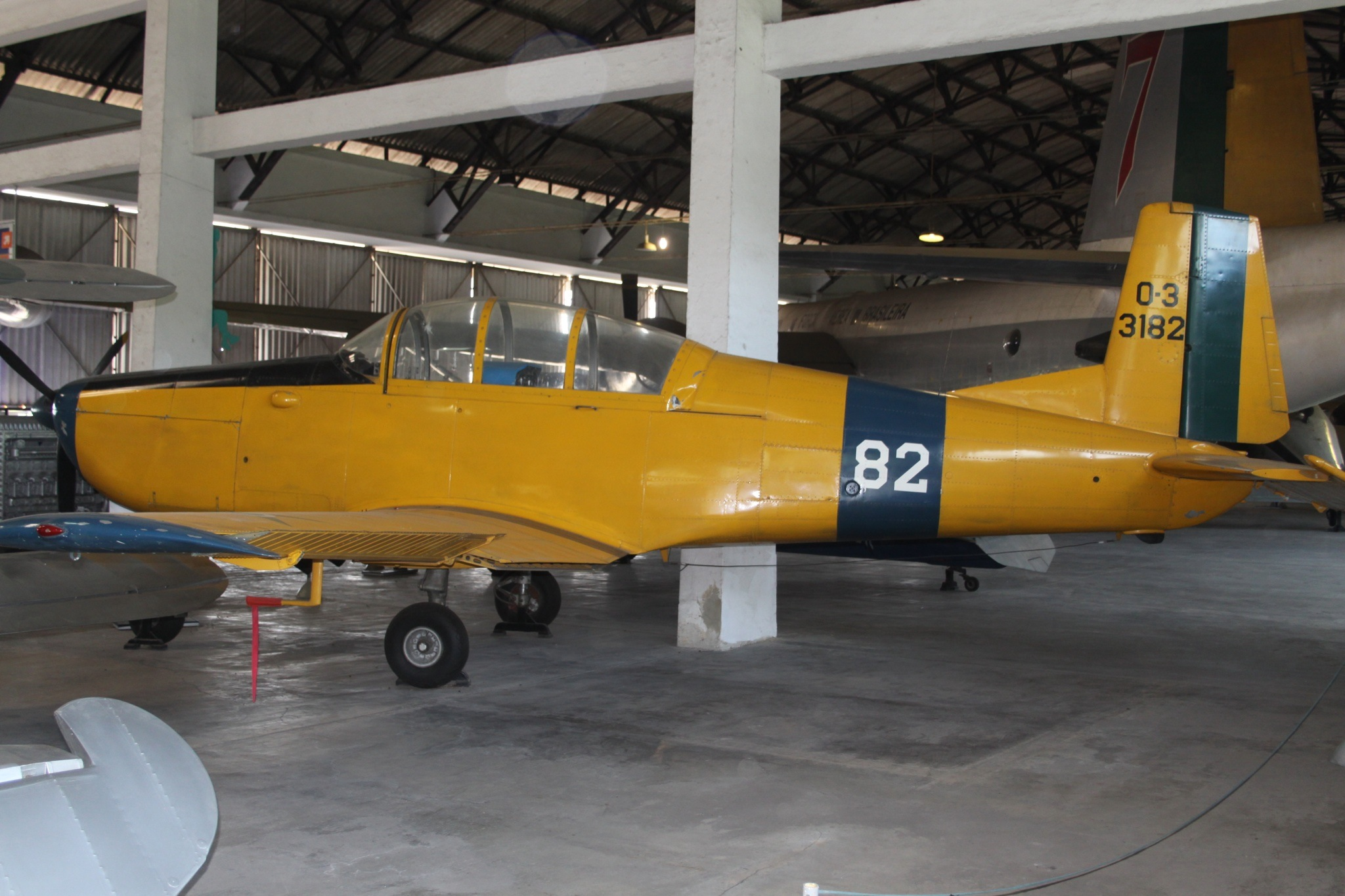
Brazilian P-3, lacking the ventral fin

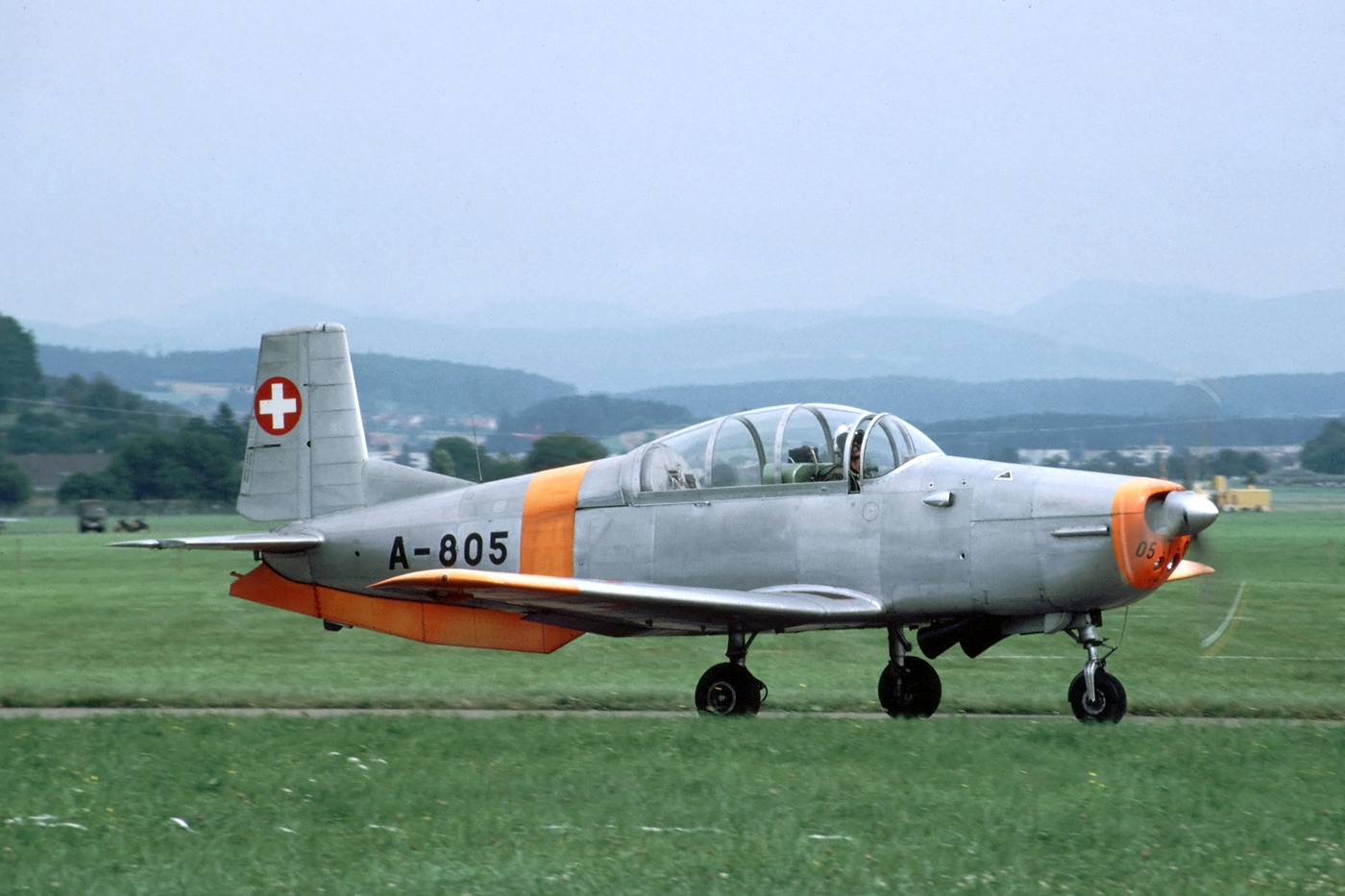
Pilatus P3-03

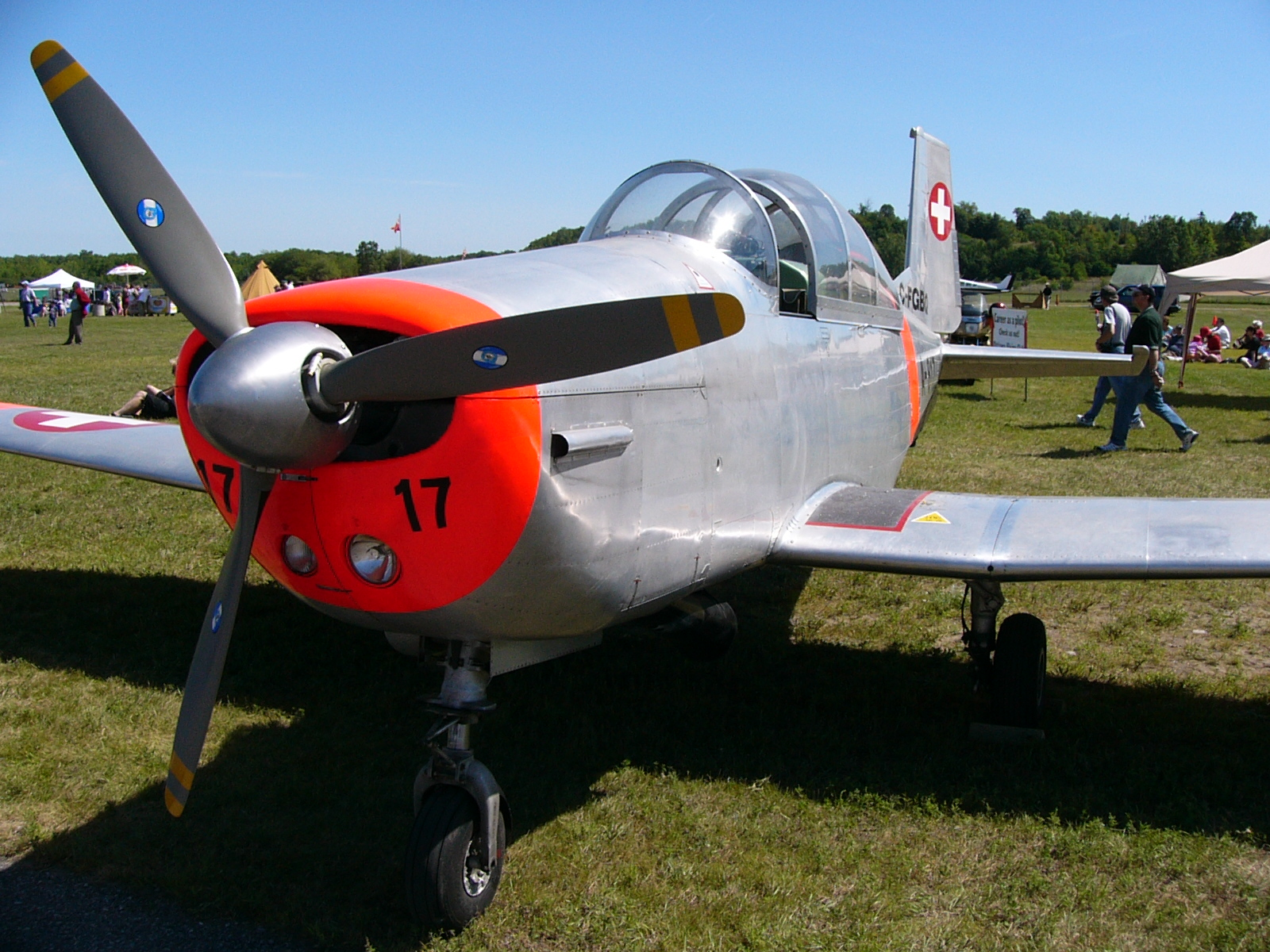
A civil Pilatus P-3-05

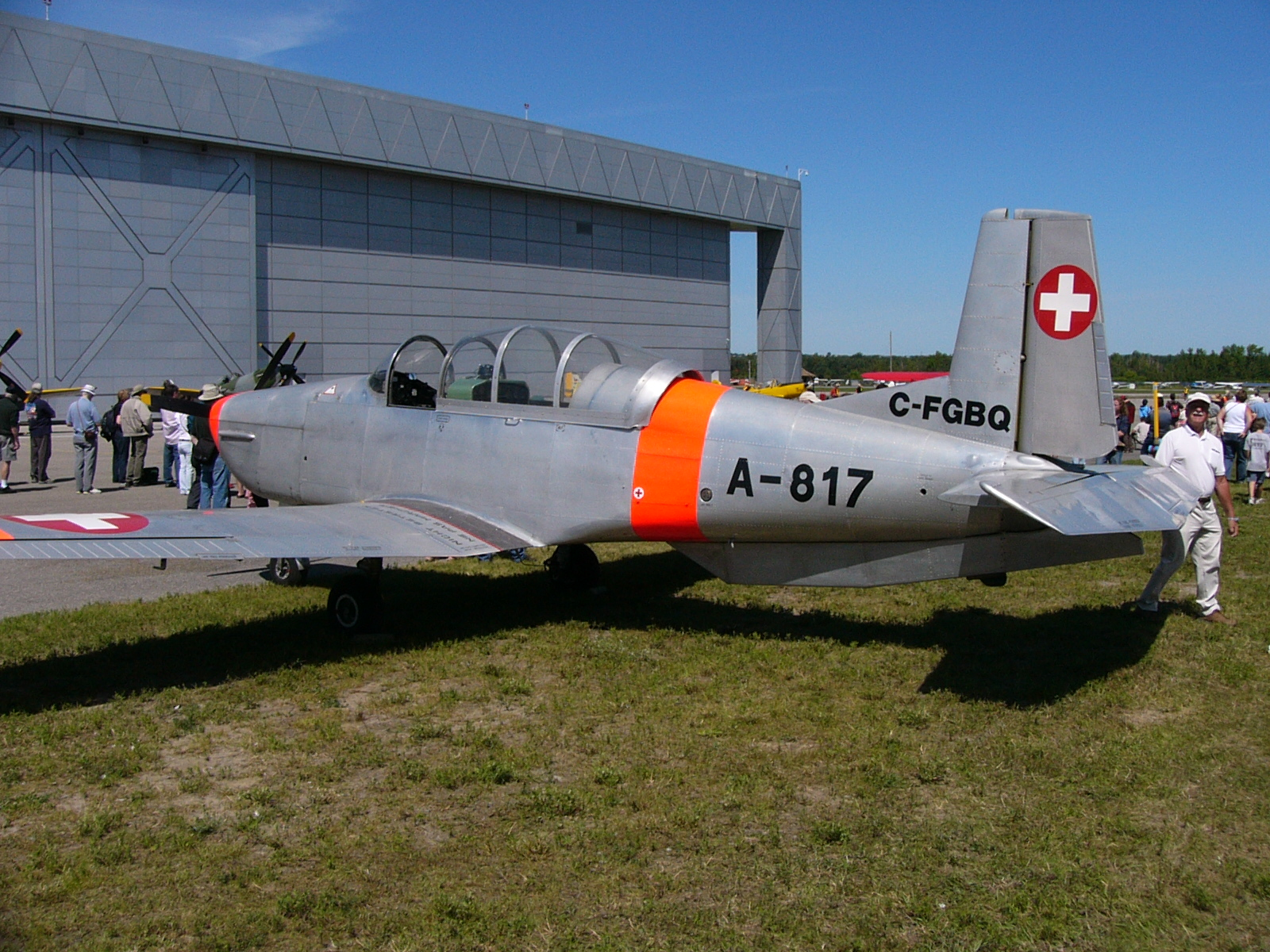
Pilatus P-3-05

The first prototype P-3.01 was built in 1953 and flew on 3 September the same year with a two-blade propeller. The power of the engine of the aircraft proved to be insufficient. A second prototype to become the military prototype flew in August, 1954, now equipped with a different engine and a three blade propeller. During the evaluation of the military prototype, now designated P-3.02 (HB-HOO, becoming A-801 in January 1956), the aircraft had to perform against a T-34 Mentor that had been brought to Switzerland. The test pilot at the demonstration flight went to the limits and flew a standing "8", knowing, the Mentor would not be able to fly this manoeuvre. After the acceptance by the Swiss Air Force, the service received a pre-series of 12 aircraft type P-3.03 (A-802-A-813). Six additional examples were built and flew with civilian markings, those P-3.04 were later acquired by the Brazilian Navy. The Swiss Air Force then purchased 60 airframes of the type P-3.05 (A-814-A-873) and used their P-3s as a training aircraft until 1983, although it continued to be used as a liaison aircraft for another decade. In 1993–1995, 65 ex-Swiss Air Force aircraft were sold on the private market.

The Pilatus P-3 entered service with the Swiss Air Force in 1956.

After two crashes resulting from an aircraft going into a flat spin, the aircraft A-858 received a ventral fin. After successful testing, all swiss P-3 received the fin.

The prototype P-3.01 HB-HON was used by Pilatus' sister company Contraves as a target tug before returning to Pilatus to become the prototype of the PC-7 in 1966.

== Variants ==
P-3-01
Prototype
P-3-02
Military prototype
P-3-03
Pre-production aircraft for the Swiss Air Force. 12 built.
P-3-04
Six built with and flown in civilian markings. Later acquired by the Brazilian Navy and designated L-3, O-3, and later U-3.
P-3-05
Production variant for the Swiss Air Force. 60 built.

== Operators ==
Brazil

- Brazilian Navy

Switzerland

- Swiss Air Force
- P3 Flyers

The P-3 Flyers is an independent air display team based in Switzerland. Formed in 1996. it currently operates five ex-Swiss Air Force P3 aircraft.

== Specifications (Pilatus P-3-03) ==
Data from Jane's All The World's Aircraft 1958–59

General characteristics

- Crew: one
- Capacity: one passenger
- Length: 8.75 m (28 ft 8 in)
- Wingspan: 10.40 m (34 ft 1 in)
- Height: 3.05 m (10 ft 0 in)
- Wing area: 16.55 m^{2} (178.1 sq ft)
- Aspect ratio: 6.55:1
- Airfoil: NACA 64A series
- Empty weight: 1,090 kg (2,403 lb)
- Gross weight: 1,415 kg (3,120 lb)
- Max takeoff weight: 1,500 kg (3,307 lb)
- Fuel capacity: 160 L (42 US gal; 35 imp gal)
- Powerplant: 1 × Lycoming GO-435-C2-A2 6-cylinder air-cooled four stroke horizontally opposed piston engine, 190 kW (260 hp)
- Propellers: 3-bladed Hartzell constant-speed propeller

Performance

- Maximum speed: 310 km/h (190 mph, 170 kn) sea level to 2,000 m (6,600 ft) at 1,500 kg (3,307 lb) AUW
- Cruise speed: 252 km/h (157 mph, 136 kn) economical cruise

275 km/h (171 mph; 148 kn) maximum cruise

- Stall speed: 100 km/h (62 mph, 54 kn)
- Never exceed speed: 500 km/h (310 mph, 270 kn)
- Range: 750 km (470 mi, 400 nmi) maximum in still air
- Service ceiling: 5,500 m (18,000 ft)
- Absolute ceiling: 5,100 m (16,700 ft)
- Rate of climb: 7 m/s (1,400 ft/min)
- Wing loading: 90.63 kg/m^{2} (18.56 lb/sq ft)
- Power/mass: 0.12 kW/kg (0.073 hp/lb)
- Take-off distance to 15 m (49 ft): 342 m (1,120 ft) on hard runway at sea level
- Landing distance from 15 m (49 ft): 390 m (1,280 ft) on hard runway at sea level

== See also ==
Related development

- Pilatus PC-7
- Pilatus PC-9

Aircraft of comparable role, configuration, and era

- Beechcraft T-34 Mentor
- HAL HPT-32 Deepak
- PZL TS-8 Bies

== Bibliography ==
- Genève, Alain (January 1990). "50 ans d'aviation au pied du Mont Pilatus (2): Le Pilatus P-3" [50 Years of Aviation at the Foot of Mount Pilatus: The Pilatus P-3]. Le Fana de l'Aviation (in French) (242): 18–21. ISSN 0757-4169.
