= Pilatus SB-2 =

SB-2 Pelican
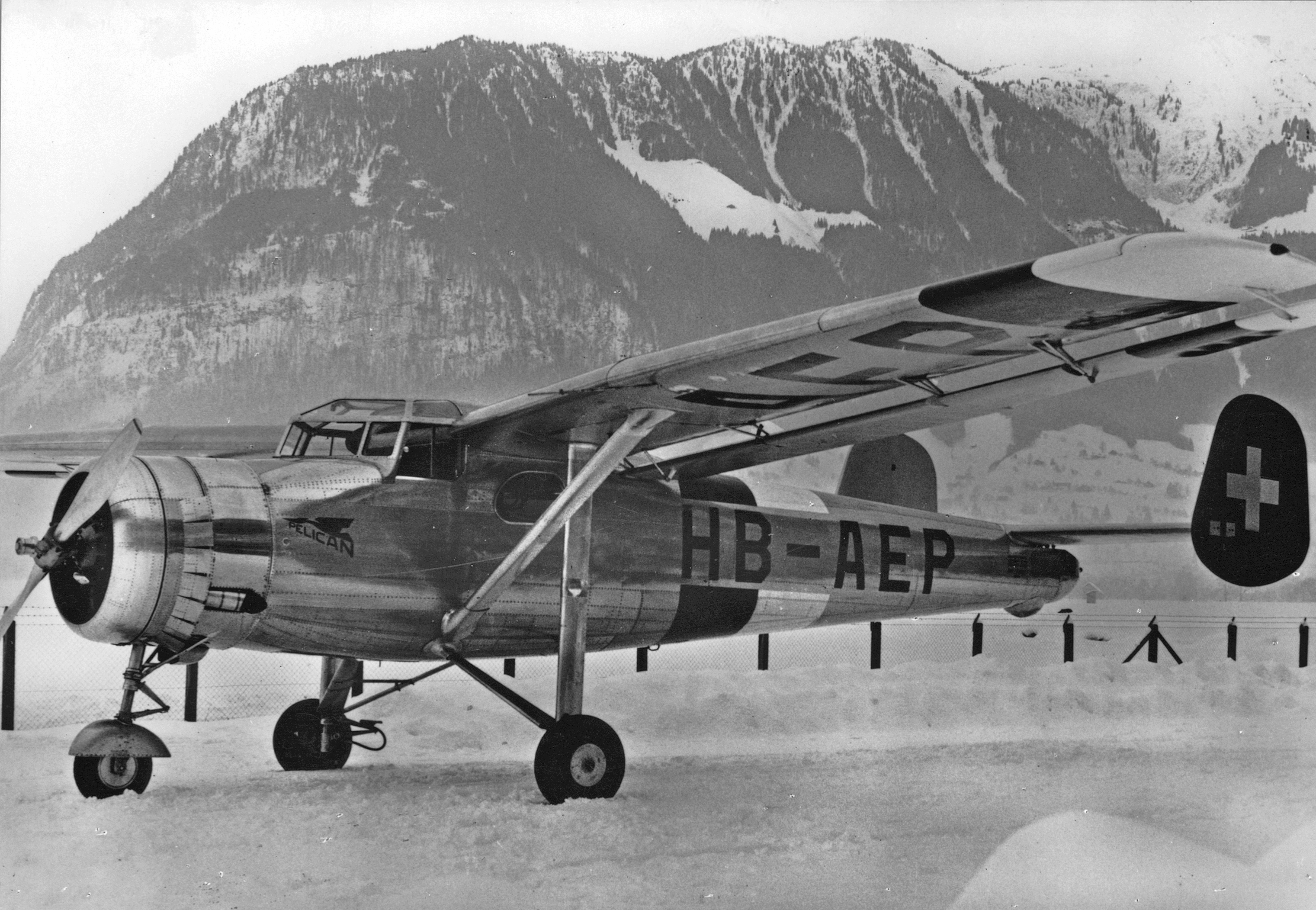
- Pilatus SB-2

General information
- Type: Four/six-seat light transport
- National origin: Switzerland
- Manufacturer: Pilatus Aircraft
- Number built: 1

History
- First flight: 30 May 1944

The Pilatus SB-2 Pelican was a civil utility aircraft developed by a purposely founded development bureau at the ETH Zurich on behalf of the Federal Air Authority. In November 1940 it was decided to go on with the project and build the aircraft, in February 1941 the Authority approved the development bureau to have it built at the newly formed Pilatus Aircraft company.

== Design and development ==
In 1938 the Federal Air Authority was looking for an aircraft able to land at minimal airfields in mountain valleys. In fact the aircraft was desired to define the criteria such possible future airfields would have to meet. So this was not to be the aircraft for such air transport itself but a means to find possible airfield locations.

The previous project of a four-seater STOL experimental aircraft under the designation Studienbüro für Spezialflugzeuge SB-1 was not implemented, so it was followed by the SB-2, which at some moments was also discussed for commercial use. Work on the SB-2 Pelican, a special “slow-flying” aircraft, commenced in the winter of 1941. Good short takeoff and landing credentials, plus steep climbing capabilities, were essential attributes of the aircraft flown in the narrow Alpine valleys at that time. The aircraft was designed to carry five people, the double controls could be reduced to one if flown with only one pilot.

The configuration of the SB-2 was slightly unusual, in that it was provided with tricycle undercarriage (an uncommon feature at the time), and a wing that had a slight forward sweep.

As it turned out, the type was never actually tested in its originally intended role. Only twice the aircraft was used later by the company it was sold to, Alpar, to land in a narrow mountain valley.

The SB-2 also served as the basis for the design work on a larger STOL aircraft with an increased passenger capacity, the Studienbüro für Spezialflugzeuge SB-5, whose development was stopped prior to any construction work.

== Operational history ==
The SB-2 made its maiden flight on 30 May 1944. After extensive trials, the only model built went to Alpar AG in Bern. The Pelikan was well suited for passenger operations, but could have also been used for aerial photography, which it never was. The bottom loading opening was useful for some freight transport and agricultural work.

During an air display on 13 June 1948, the Pelican flipped over because the nosewheel sheared off from an unnoticed transverse slip. It was stored damaged during which time still improvements were discussed by the chief engineer Belart of the Studienbüro, while Alpar was hoping to raise the takeoff weight and asked Pilatus to submit a bid for a conversion to seven seats at the end of January 1949. Calculations were made and drawings produced with other wheels. When Pilatus refused to offer a price and insisted on effort calculation, estimated at 160'000 Swiss Francs, Alpar had to give up plans to rebuild the aircraft. On March 23, 1949, the aircraft was removed from the Swiss registry.

== Specifications (SB-2) ==

Data from Jane's all the World's Aircraft 1947

General characteristics

- Crew: 1/2
- Capacity: up to five passengers
- Length: 9.9 m (32 ft 6 in)
- Wingspan: 15.5 m (50 ft 10 in)
- Height: 3.2 m (10 ft 6 in)
- Wing area: 29 m^{2} (310 sq ft)
- Empty weight: 1,596 kg (3,519 lb) 4 pax
- Gross weight: 2,095 kg (4,619 lb) 4 pax
- Fuel capacity: 340 L (90 US gal; 75 imp gal) fuel in two wing tanks; 30 L (7.9 US gal; 6.6 imp gal) oil
- Powerplant: 1 × Pratt & Whitney R-985 Wasp Junior TB 9-cyl air-cooled radial piston engine, 330 kW (440 hp) for take-off
- Propellers: 2-bladed Hamilton Standard 2-position variable-pitch propeller

Performance

- Maximum speed: 230 km/h (140 mph, 120 kn) at sea level
- Cruise speed: 201 km/h (125 mph, 109 kn) at sea level (280 hp (210 kW) at 1,950 rpm)
- Minimum level speed:76 km/h (47 mph; 41 kn)
- Range: 805 km (500 mi, 435 nmi)
- Endurance: 4 hours
- Take-off distance: 366 m (1,201 ft) to 15 m (49 ft)
- Landing distance: 220 m (720 ft) from 15 m (49 ft)
- Wing loading: 14.7 kg/m^{2} (3.0 lb/sq ft) 4 pax
- Power/mass: 6.37 kg/kW (10.5 lb/hp) (four passengers at take-off)

External images
- Pilatus ETH SB-2 Pelican
- Pilatus SB-2 Plan
- Pilatus SB-2 Air
- Pilatus SB-2 Taxiway
- Pilatus SP-2 Side
- Pilatus SP-2 front
- Pilatus SB-2 top

== See also ==
Aircraft of comparable role, configuration, and era

- Max Holste Broussard
