= Pilatus P-1 =

P-1
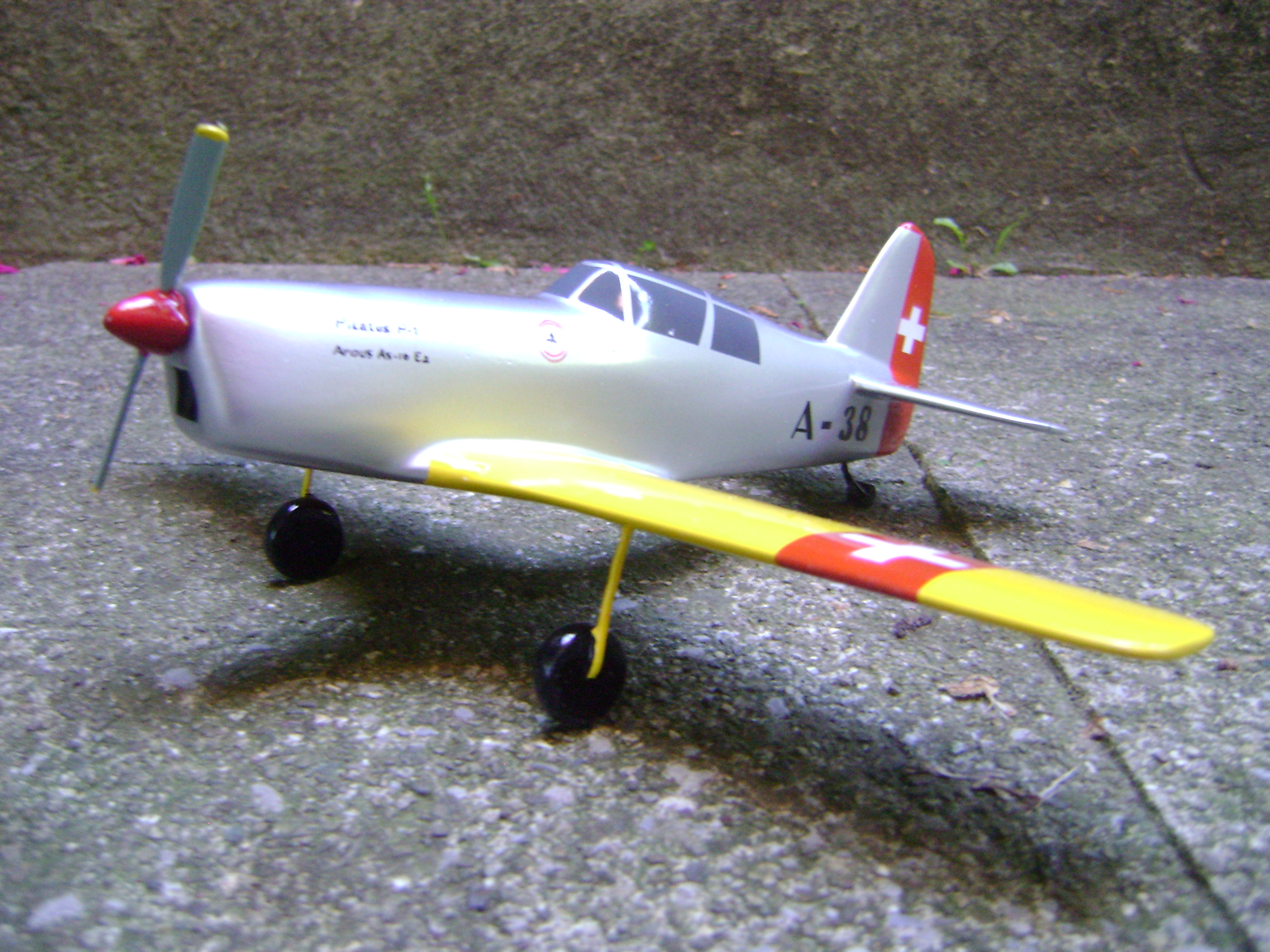
- Sketch of the Pilatus P-1

General information
- Type: single-seat military trainer
- National origin: Switzerland
- Manufacturer: Pilatus Aircraft
- Number built: 0

The Pilatus P-1 was a single-engined, single-seat training aircraft project from Pilatus Aircraft in Switzerland, ca.1941.

== Design and development ==
External images
- Pilatus P-1
- Pilatus P-1 Plan
- A Pilatus P-2 converted to a Pilatus P-1

The P-1 project began around the end of October 1940 as the first project of Pilatus, influenced by engineer Henri Fiert. The layout and design principles were carried through to the Pilatus P-2, which achieved success as a trainer with the Swiss Air Force. The fuselage structure of the P-1 would have consisted of welded steel tube, with removable front aluminium alloy panels and fabric covering aft of the cockpit. The wings would have been of wood built up around a one-piece wooden spar with plywood skinning.

== Specifications (P-1 estimated) ==
Data from Pilatus Flugzeuge: 1939–1989

General characteristics

- Crew: one
- Length: 6.9 m (22 ft 8 in)
- Wingspan: 9.2 m (30 ft 2 in)
- Height: 2.1 m (6 ft 11 in)
- Wing area: 12.7 m^{2} (137 sq ft)
- Empty weight: 850 kg (1,874 lb)
- Gross weight: 1,150 kg (2,535 lb)
- Powerplant: 1 × Argus As 10E2 V-8 inverted air-cooled piston engine, 180 kW (240 hp)

Performance

- Maximum speed: 325 km/h (202 mph, 175 kn)
- Service ceiling: 6,000 m (20,000 ft)
- Rate of climb: 6.5 m/s (1,280 ft/min)

== See also ==
Related development

- Pilatus P-2

Aircraft of comparable role, configuration, and era

- Miles Master
