= Pilatus B-4 =

Swiss glider

B4-PC11
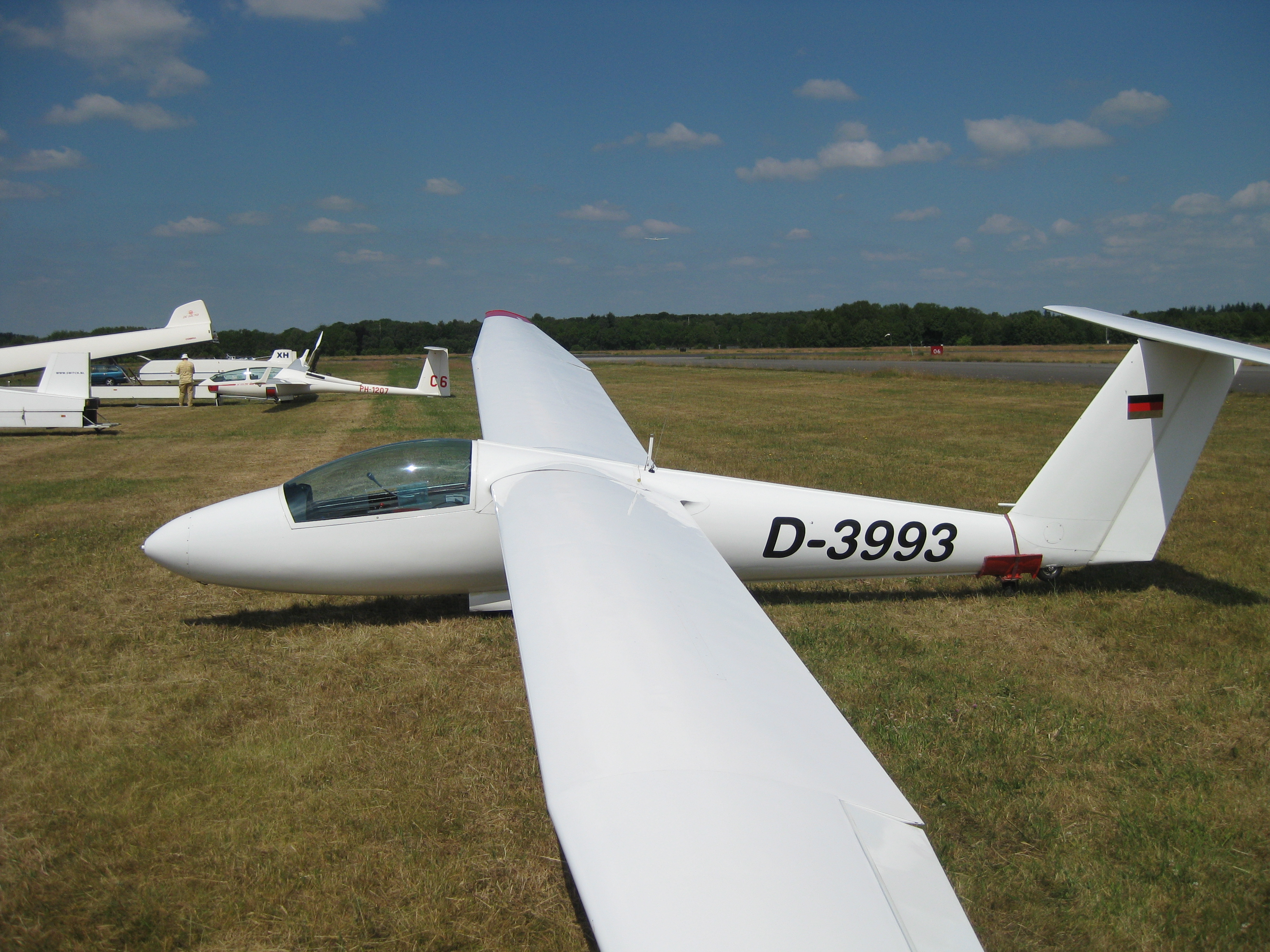

General information
- Type: Club-class glider
- National origin: Switzerland
- Manufacturer: Pilatus
- Designer: Ingo Herbst, Manfred Küppers and Rudolf Reinke
- Number built: 322

History
- First flight: 7 November 1966

The Pilatus B4-PC11 (also known as the PC-11 in the Pilatus numbering sequence) is an all-metal intermediate glider built by Pilatus Aircraft of Switzerland.

The B4-PC11 is designed to Standard Class specifications, meaning that it has a 15-metre wingspan and no wing flaps. Air brakes are provided on the top surface of each wing for glidepath control. Construction is aluminium, with foam ribs in the mainplane, fin and tailplane.

== Development ==
The design of this glider originated in the 1960s, when the company Firma Rheintalwerke G. Basten(from which the "B" in the original designation is derived) manufactured the first two prototypes. The designers were Ingo Herbst, Manfred Küppers and Rudolf Reinke. The first flight of the first prototype took place on 7 November 1966. However, no series production was started.

In 1972 Pilatus bought the manufacturing licence for the B-4 and renamed it the B4-PC11. In the spring of the same year the first production example (numbered HB-1100) made its first flight.

A total of 322 B4-PC11s of all versions were built by Pilatus by 1980, when the license to manufacture the craft was sold to Nippi Corporation of Japan, who built only 13 gliders, plus one two-seater prototype designated the Nippi B4T.

Subsequently, in 1994, EWMS Technomanagement GmbH, which was founded in 1994 at Fribourg, Switzerland and was deregistered in 2024, bought the rights to produce and service the B4-PC11. This company also specialized in renovating and upgrading older B4-PC11 craft. In addition, it manufactured a motorized B4-PC11.

== Variants ==
B4-PC11
Permitted to fly a number of aerobatic manoeuvres, it was not permitted to do inverted loops or flick/snap/quick maneuvers. The B4-PC11 was available with either fixed or retractable landing gear.
B4-PC11A
developed to perform inverted loops and was also able to handle higher g-forces.
B4-PC11AF

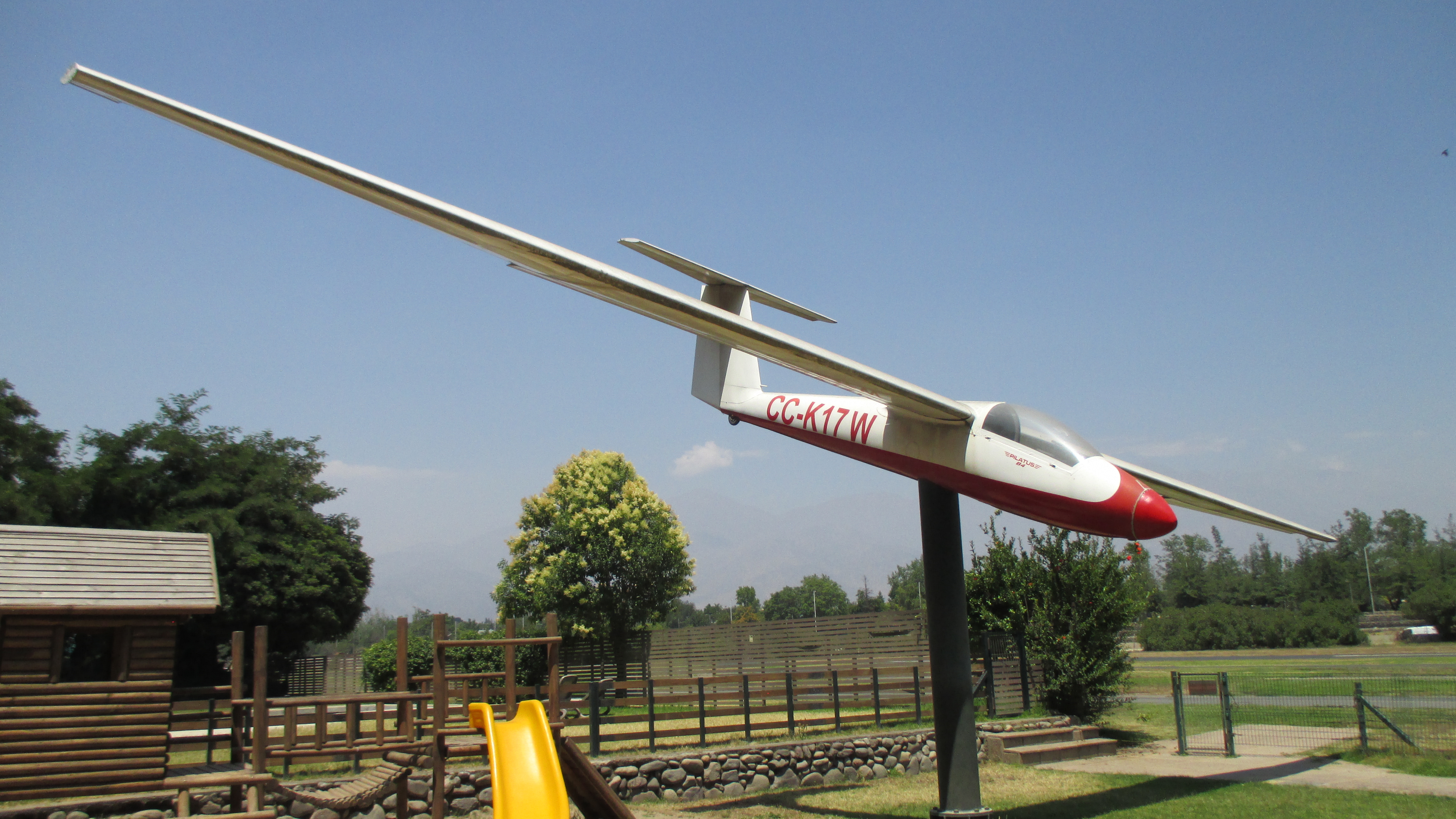
A B4-PC11AF on display.

released in 1975, with full aerobatic capabilities. Nippi Corporation in Japan produced 13 pieces with Japanese Type Certificate Nippi-Pilatus B4-PC11AF (1978-1994). Then the rights were transferred to EWMS Technomanagement.
Nippi B4T
One prototype tandem was made by Nippi in 1983.
Lynch B4M1
a motor glider conversion in Australia by John F. Lynch, powered by a 17.9 kW (24.0 hp) König SC 430 engine.

The changes in construction from B4-PC11 through A and AF variants were to add extra ribs through the fuselage section (increasing torsional rigidity, only AF variant), and to modify the control column stops and shorten the rudder, giving greater control surface deflection.

== Specifications ==
General characteristics

- Crew: one
- Length: 6.57 m (21 ft 7 in)
- Wingspan: 15 m (49 ft 3 in)
- Height: 1.57 m (5 ft 2 in)
- Wing area: 14 m^{2} (150 sq ft)
- Aspect ratio: 16
- Airfoil: NACA 64(3)-618
- Empty weight: 230 kg (507 lb)
- Gross weight: 350 kg (772 lb)

Performance

- Never exceed speed: 240 km/h (150 mph, 130 kn)
- g limits:

PC-11
+5.3 -3
PC-11A
+6.5 -4
PC-11AF
+7 -5

- Maximum glide ratio: 35:1 (Measurements performed by Idaflieg suggest 30)
- Rate of sink: 0.63 m/s (124 ft/min)

== See also ==
Aircraft of comparable role, configuration, and era

- Schweizer SGS 1-34
- ICA-Brasov IS-29

Related lists

- List of gliders
