= Pilatus P-5 =

P-5
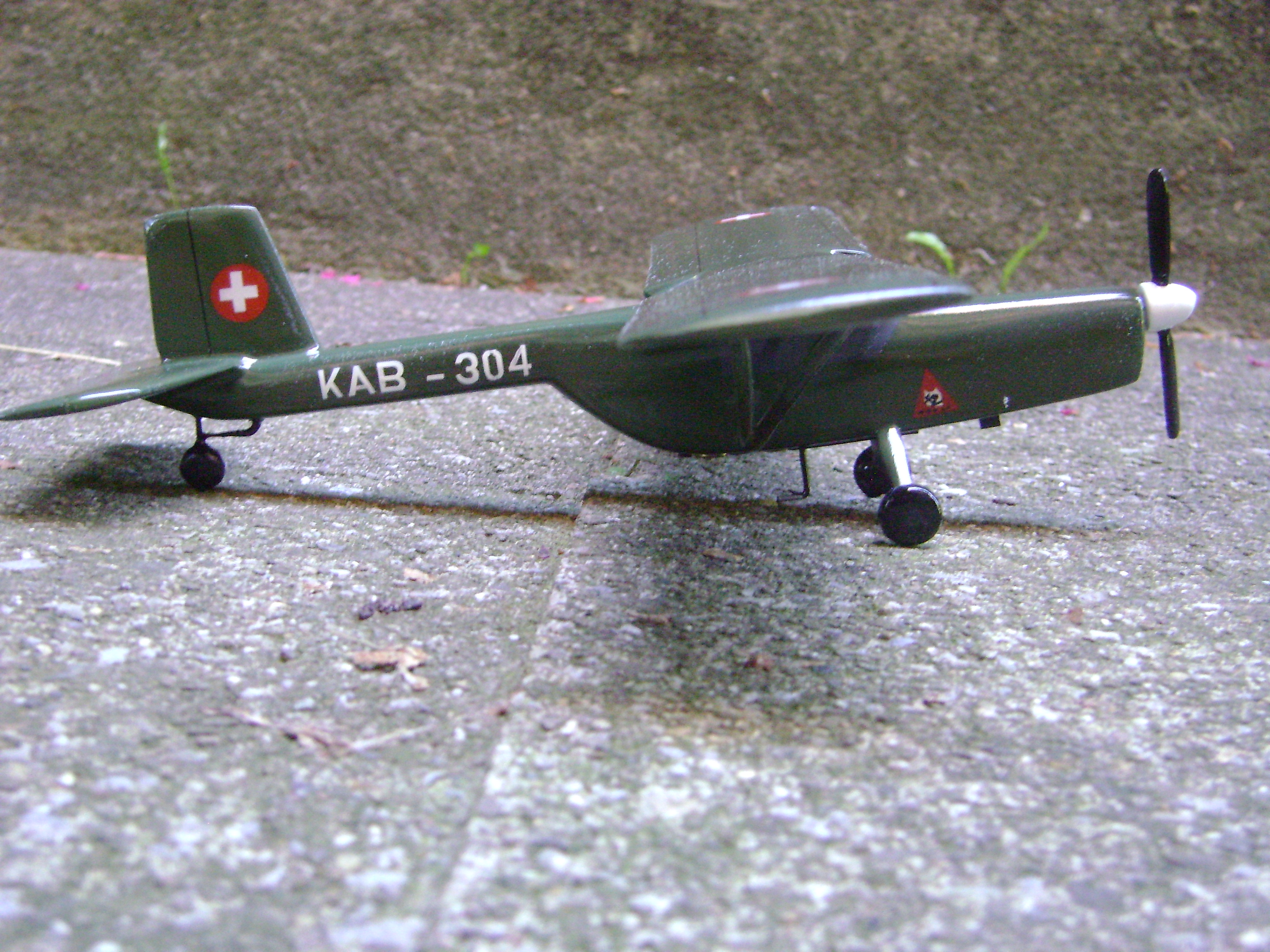
- Model of the Pilatus P-5 (artist's concept)

General information
- Type: two-seat artillery observation aircraft
- National origin: Switzerland
- Manufacturer: Pilatus Aircraft
- Number built: 0

The Pilatus P-5 was a single-engined artillery observation aircraft project from Pilatus Aircraft in Switzerland.

== Design and development ==
External image
- Pilatus P-5
- Pilatus P-5

The first drawings for the Pilatus P-5 were made in 1951. The client was the Federal Military Department (EMD). The main purpose for the P-5 was for artillery observation. It was a single-engine, two-seat high-wing monoplane with fixed wheels. The aircraft frame was intended to be built out of tubular steel and skinned with metal. The main wings and tail were intended to be made from an alloy, not steel. This aircraft had fixed wing with slats and flaps fitted on to them. The pilot and observer were seated in a generously glazed cabin that had exceptionally good visibility in all directions. This view was due mainly to the curved sides which allowed the aircrew to look almost straight down. This P-5 design was abandoned in 1951 and no prototype aircraft were ever built.

== Specifications (P-5 estimated) ==
Data from Pilatus Flugzeuge: 1939–1989

General characteristics

- Crew: 2
- Length: 9.2 m (30 ft 2 in)
- Wingspan: 12 m (39 ft 4 in)
- Height: 2.5 m (8 ft 2 in)
- Empty weight: 860 kg (1,896 lb)
- Powerplant: 1 × Walter Minor 6-III I-6 inverted air-cooled piston engine, 120 kW (160 hp)

Performance

- Maximum speed: 190 km/h (120 mph, 100 kn)
- Landing speed: 53 km/h (33 mph; 29 kn)
- Service ceiling: 4,800 m (15,700 ft)
- Rate of climb: 6 m/s (1,200 ft/min)
- Take off distance: 65 m (213 ft)
- Landing distance: 50 m (164 ft)

== See also ==
Aircraft of comparable role, configuration, and era

- Miles Master
