= Studienbüro für Spezialflugzeuge SB-1 =

SB-1
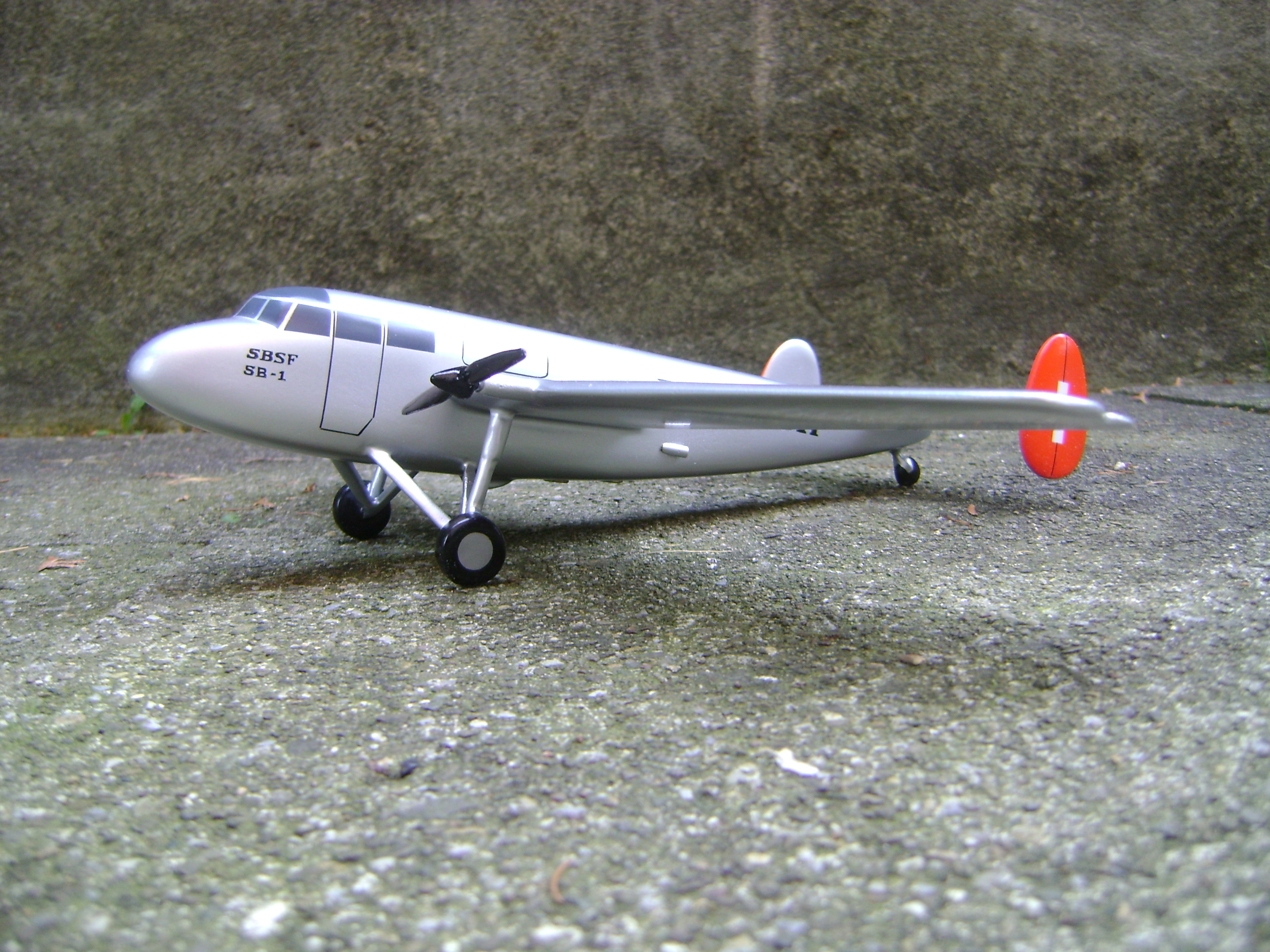
- A model of the SB-1

General information
- Type: Twin-engined experimental
- National origin: Switzerland
- Designer: Studienbüro für Spezialflugzeuge

The SB-1 was to be an experimental aircraft developed by the Studienbüro für Spezialflugzeuge at the ETH Zurich department of aircraft statics and aircraft construction at request of the Federal Air Authority. (SB - Schweizer Bergflugzeug - Swiss mountain aircraft).

== Design and development ==
In 1938 the Bundesamt für Zivilluftfahrt was looking for an aircraft able to land at minial airfields in mountain valleys. In fact the aircraft was desired to define the criteria such possible future airfields would have to meet. So this was not to be the aircraft for such air transport itself but a mean to find possible airfield locations.

The SB-1 was intended to be a mid-wing monoplane with accommodation for four people. The fuselage was to have built-up from welded steel tube covered with light-alloy (front) and fabric (rear). The aircraft would have been powered by a single Argus As 10E / Argus As 410 air-cooled V-8 engine, located at the center of gravity, in the fuselage, below the wing centre-section. The engine drove two-bladed propellers, driven by V-belts and idlers, mounted on the wing leading-edges either side of the fuselage, reducing drag and imbuing favorable low-speed flight characteristics due to the air flow of the propellers acting directly on the leading edge of the wing. The SB-1 was designed with a fixed tail-wheel undercarriage and also had a twin-fin tail unit. A study was also made of two coupled engines mounted in the fuselage.

The wing profile was tested in the local wind tunnel at the ETH. The power transmission for the propellers was tested in a factory building at Uster in original size using an aircraft engine borrowed from the Flugwaffe. A structure of the wooden wing was built in Berne and tested at the Swiss Federal Laboratories for Materials Science and Technology as well as at the department of aircraft statics and aircraft construction.

Development of this project was abandoned when after evaluation of the Fieseler Storch in 1940 it became clear, that the configuration chosen wouldn't lead to the desired aircraft.

Even the type SB-2 of the same developer, that was subsequently built, was actually never tested in its originally intended role.

== Specifications (SB-1) ==
Data from

General characteristics

- Crew: one
- Capacity: up to 3 observers
- Length: 10.3 m (33 ft 10 in)
- Wingspan: 15 m (49 ft 3 in)
- Powerplant: 1 × Argus As 10E / Argus As 410 V-8 air-cooled inverted piston engines, 336 kW (451 hp)

Performance

- Maximum speed: 250 km/h (160 mph, 130 kn)
- Wing loading: 26 kg/m^{2} (5.3 lb/sq ft)
