= Lycoming O-435 =

American 1940s aircraft engine

O-435
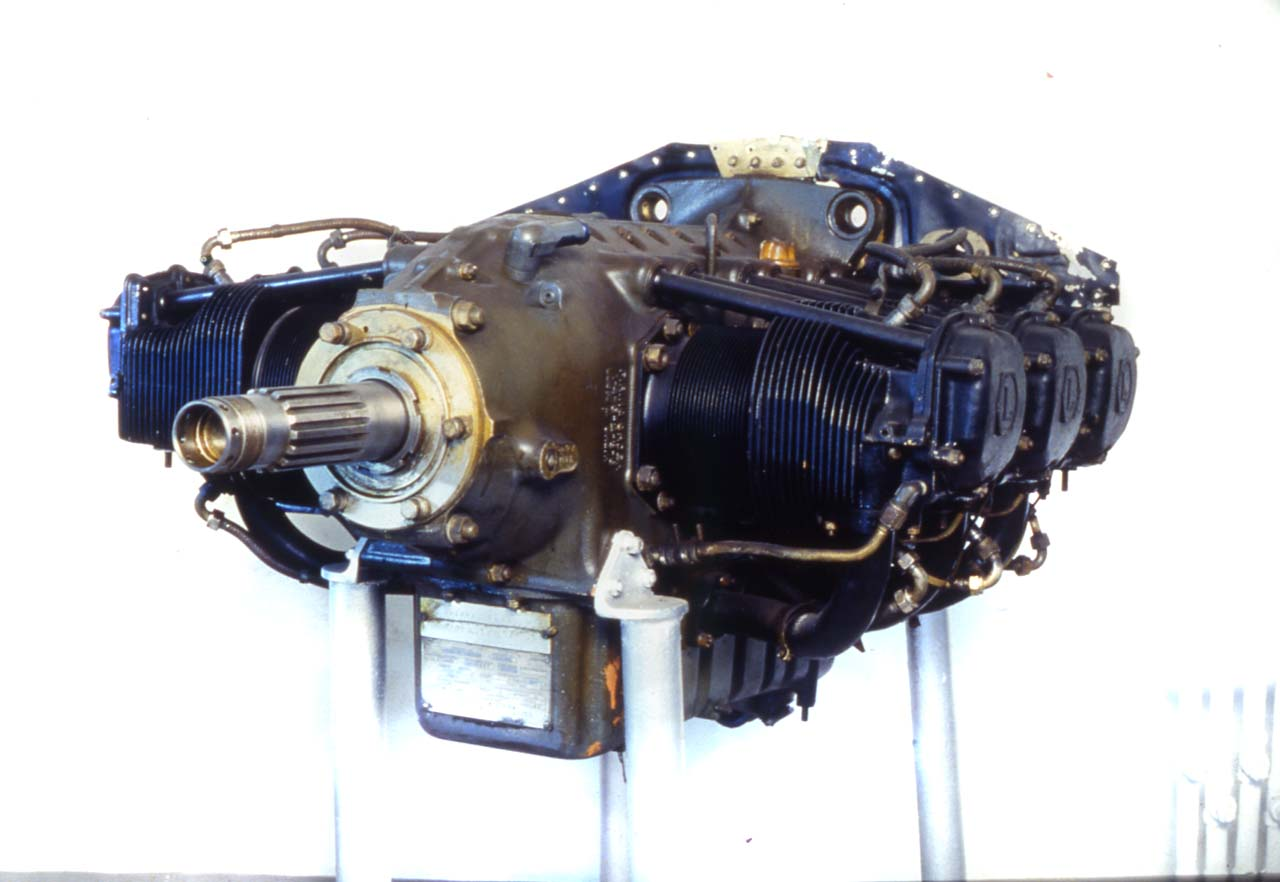
- Type: Piston tank and aircraft engine
- National origin: United States
- Manufacturer: Lycoming Engines
- First run: 1939
- Major applications: Beechcraft Bonanza; Bell 47; Helio Courier; Hiller OH-23 Raven; M22 Locust; Stinson L-5 Sentinel
- Manufactured: 1942–1975 out of production
- Developed from: Lycoming O-290

The Lycoming O-435 is an American six-cylinder, horizontally opposed, internal combustion aircraft engine. Used on both fixed-wing airplanes and helicopters, the engine is a six-cylinder version of the four-cylinder Lycoming O-290.

== Design and development ==
The powerplant is a horizontally opposed Lycoming six-cylinder, gasoline-fueled internal combustion design. It is a direct-drive or geared, air-cooled, and naturally aspirated engine. The cylinders have steel barrels with aluminum heads, and the valves are operated by hydraulic lifters. The crankshaft is supported in an aluminum-alloy split case by four main bearings and one ball-thrust bearing, and lubricating oil is supplied from a 12 quart wet sump. The camshaft rides in journals that do not employ bearing inserts. The accessory housing supports two magnetos, a starter, a generator, and a dual tach drive. A spare mounting pad is included for a vacuum pump.

== Variants ==
All engines have an additional prefix preceding the 435 to indicate the specific configuration of the engine. There are also numerous engine suffixes, denoting different accessories such as different manufacturers' carburetors, or different magnetos.

=== O-435 models ===
O-435
Baseline engine model, producing 175 hp (130 kW) at 2300 rpm, with a compression ratio of 6.25:1, a dry weight of 347 lb (157 kg) and fitted with a Marvel MA-4 carburetor. Type certified on February 11, 1942.
O-435-A
Engine model with provisions for automotive type accessories, producing 190 hp (142 kW) at 2550 rpm, with a compression ratio of 6.5:1, a dry weight of 348 lb (158 kg) with a -8 magneto and 342 lb (155 kg) with a -20 magneto and fitted with a Marvel MA-4-5 or PS-5C carburetor. Type certified on February 11, 1942.
O-435-A2
Engine model with a redesigned improved crankcase, cylinders, valves and valve seats, exhaust valve guides and rocker shaft bushing. It also has provisions for automotive-type accessories. It produced 225 hp (168 kW) at 3000 rpm, with a compression ratio of 7.5:1, a dry weight of 365 lb (166 kg) and fitted with a Marvel MA-4-5 carburetor. Type certified on October 19, 1949 and cancelled on February 25, 1944.
O-435-A3
Type certified on January 5, 1951 and cancelled on February 8, 1955.
O-435-B (military designation O-435-5)
Engine model with provisions for AN type accessories, producing 235 hp (175 kW) at 3000 rpm, with a compression ratio of 7.5:1, a dry weight of 362 lb (164 kg) and fitted with a Marvel MA-4-5 carburetor. Type certified on October 7, 1943 and cancelled on November 2, 1950.
O-435-C (military designation O-435-1)
Engine model with provisions for AN type accessories, producing 175 hp (130 kW) at 2300 rpm, with a compression ratio of 6.25:1, a dry weight of 356 lb (161 kg) and fitted with a Marvel MA-4SPA carburetor. Type certified on January 11, 1943.
O-435-C1 (military designation O-435-11)
Engine model, with revised type valves, valve guides, an accessory case with generator and starter drive, producing 175 hp (130 kW) at 2300 rpm, with a compression ratio of 6.25:1, a dry weight of 366 lb (166 kg) and fitted with a Marvel MA-4 carburetor. Type certified on January 2, 1948.
O-435-C2 (military designation O-435-13)
Engine model, with provisions for O-435-C accessories carburetor, producing 175 hp (130 kW) at 2300 rpm, with a compression ratio of 6.25:1, a dry weight of 368 lb (167 kg) and fitted with a Marvel MA-4SPA carburetor. Type certified on January 2, 1948.
O-435-K
Engine model that incorporates a GO-435-C2 accessory case and crankcase. It produces 240 hp (179 kW) at 3000 rpm, with a compression ratio of 7.3:1, a dry weight of 405 lb (184 kg) and fitted with a Marvel MA-4-5 carburetor. Type certified on January 24, 1951.
O-435-K1 (military designation O-435-4)
Engine model with increased maximum continuous rating and the generator pad omitted, approved for helicopter installations. It produces 250 hp (186 kW) at 3000 rpm, with a compression ratio of 7.3:1, a dry weight of 405 lb (184 kg) and fitted with a Marvel MA-4-5 carburetor. Type certified on March 30, 1951.
O-435-2
Military engine model.
O-435-2-M1
Civil modified military engine model, by the Associated Aircraft Modification Company, with Bendix PS-5C carburetor with 380123-1 setting. It produces 235 hp (175 kW) at 3200 rpm, with a compression ratio of 7.5:1, a dry weight of 405 lb (184 kg). Only military O-435-2 engines with serial numbers L00849-11 through L-1117-11 are eligible for this modification.

=== GO-435 models ===
GO-435
Baseline geared engine model. It incorporates six 3rd-order crankshaft torsional vibration dampers and reduction gearing. It produced 210 hp (157 kW) at 3000 rpm, with a compression ratio of 6.25:1, a dry weight of 407 lb (185 kg) and fitted with a Marvel MA-4-5 carburetor. Type certified on August 30, 1944 and cancelled on November 2, 1950.
GO-435-A2
Type certified on October 19, 1949 and cancelled on February 8, 1955.
GO-435-C2 (military designation O-435-17)
Geared engine model which incorporates an improved crankcase and cylinder assembly. It produces 260 hp (194 kW) at 3400 rpm for takeoff, with a compression ratio of 7.3:1, a dry weight of 422 lb (191 kg) and fitted with a Marvel MA-4-5 or PS-5BD carburetor. Type certified on October 19, 1949.
GO-435-C2A
Geared engine model, incorporates S6LN-20 or -21 magnetos, producing 260 hp (194 kW) at 3400 rpm for takeoff, with a compression ratio of 7.3:1, a dry weight of 438 lb (199 kg) and fitted with a Marvel MA-4-5 or PS-5BD carburetor. Type certified on January 2, 1951, cancelled on February 8, 1955 and reinstated July 15, 1955.
GO-435-C2A2
Geared engine model, with a dry sump and without provisions for a hydraulic propeller control or governor, producing 260 hp (194 kW) at 3400 rpm for takeoff, with a compression ratio of 7.3:1, a dry weight of 432 lb (196 kg) and fitted with a Marvel MA-4-5 or PS-5BD carburetor. Type certified on October 24, 1957.
GO-435-C2B
Geared engine model with provisions for a hydraulic propeller and governor. It produces 260 hp (194 kW) at 3400 rpm for takeoff, with a compression ratio of 7.3:1, a dry weight of 430 lb (195 kg) and fitted with a Marvel MA-4-5 or PS-5BD carburetor. Type certified on November 6, 1952.
GO-435-C2B1
Geared engine model which incorporates a dual generator and vacuum pump drive. It produces 260 hp (194 kW) at 3400 rpm for takeoff, with a compression ratio of 7.3:1, a dry weight of 430 lb (195 kg) and fitted with a Marvel MA-4-5 or PS-5BD carburetor. Type certified on February 8, 1955.
GO-435-C2B2
Geared engine model with S6LN-20, or -21 magnetos. It produces 260 hp (194 kW) at 3400 rpm for takeoff, with a compression ratio of 7.3:1, a dry weight of 430 lb (195 kg) and fitted with a Marvel MA-4-5 or PS-5BD carburetor. Type certified on February 28, 1956.
GO-435-C2C
Geared engine model producing 260 hp (194 kW) at 3400 rpm for takeoff, with a compression ratio of 7.3:1, a dry weight of 422 lb (191 kg) and fitted with a Marvel MA-4-5 or PS-5BD carburetor. Type certified on November 24, 1953 and cancelled on July 5, 1956.
GO-435-C2D
Geared engine model producing 260 hp (194 kW) at 3400 rpm for takeoff, with a compression ratio of 7.3:1, a dry weight of 420 lb (191 kg) and fitted with a Marvel MA-4-5 or PS-5BD carburetor. Type certified on July 20, 1954 and cancelled on July 5, 1956.
GO-435-C2E
Geared engine model with S6LN-20, or -21 magnetos. It produces 260 hp (194 kW) at 3400 rpm for takeoff, with a compression ratio of 7.3:1, a dry weight of 420 lb (191 kg) and fitted with a Marvel MA-4-5 or PS-5BD carburetor. Type certified on September 27, 1956.
GO-435-D1
Geared engine model with a dry sump oil system and crosswise accessory drives. It produces 260 hp (194 kW) at 3400 rpm for takeoff, with a compression ratio of 7.3:1 and fitted with a Marvel MA-4-5 or PS-5BD carburetor. Type certified on September 25, 1953.

=== VO-435 models ===
VO-435
Base model, vertically-mounted engine for helicopters, with a dry sump oil system and side-mounted AN type accessory drives. It produces 260 hp (194 kW) at 3400 rpm for takeoff, with a compression ratio of 7.3:1, a dry weight of 396 lb (180 kg) and fitted with a Marvel MA-4-5 or MA-4-5AA carburetor. Type certified on October 11, 1954. Was re-designated as VO-435-A1A.
VO-435-A1A (military designation O-435-21)
Vertically-mounted engine model for helicopters, with a dry sump oil system and side-mounted AN type accessory drives. It produces 260 hp (194 kW) at 3400 rpm for takeoff, with a compression ratio of 7.3:1, a dry weight of 396 lb (180 kg) and fitted with a Marvel MA-4-5 or MA-4-5AA carburetor. Type certified on October 29, 1954. Re-designated from VO-435.
VO-435-A1B (military designation O-435-6)
Vertically-mounted engine model for helicopters, with a dry sump oil system and a modified accessory section. It produces 260 hp (194 kW) at 3400 rpm for takeoff, with a compression ratio of 7.3:1, a dry weight of 391 lb (177 kg) and fitted with a Marvel MA-4-5 or MA-4-5AA carburetor. Type certified on June 10, 1955.
VO-435-A1C (military designations O-435-23, O-435-23A O-435-23B and O-435-23C)
Vertically-mounted engine model for helicopters, with a dry sump oil system, which incorporates a crankcase and oil sump modification giving increased strength and an oil pump housing which is machined for a hydraulic pump drive. It produces 260 hp (194 kW) at 3400 rpm for takeoff, with a compression ratio of 7.3:1, a dry weight of 399 lb (181 kg) and fitted with a Marvel MA-4-5 or MA-4-5AA carburetor. Type certified on July 18, 1954.
VO-435-A1D (military designation O-435-6A)
Vertically-mounted engine model for helicopters, with a dry sump oil system, with crankcase and oil sump modifications for increased strength. It produces 260 hp (194 kW) at 3400 rpm for takeoff, with a compression ratio of 7.3:1, a dry weight of 390 lb (177 kg) and fitted with a Marvel MA-4-5 or MA-4-5AA carburetor. Type certified on September 27, 1956.
VO-435-A1E
Vertically-mounted engine model for helicopters, with a dry sump oil system and 6RN-200 or S6LN-204 magnetos. It produces 260 hp (194 kW) at 3400 rpm for takeoff, with a compression ratio of 7.3:1, a dry weight of 392 lb (178 kg) and fitted with a Marvel MA-4-5AA carburetor. Type certified on October 15, 1959.
VO-435-A1F
Vertically-mounted engine model for helicopters, with a dry sump oil system. It has internal piston cooling oil jets and heavy duty cylinders and may be converted to a model TVO-435-A1A. It produces 260 hp (194 kW) at 3400 rpm for takeoff, with a compression ratio of 7.3:1, a dry weight of 399 lb (181 kg) and fitted with a Marvel MA-4-5AA carburetor. Type certified on March 6, 1961.
VO-435-B1A
Vertically-mounted engine model for helicopters, with a redesigned accessory drive section, a wet oil sump and a higher compression ratio. It produces 265 hp (198 kW) at 3200 rpm for takeoff, with a compression ratio of 8.7:1, a dry weight of 419 lb (190 kg) and fitted with a Marvel MA-4-5AA carburetor. Type certified on December 15, 1965.
TVO-435-A1A
Turbocharged, vertically-mounted engine model for helicopters, with a dry sump oil system. It produces 260 hp (194 kW) at 3200 rpm for takeoff, with a compression ratio of 7.3:1, a dry weight of 468 lb (212 kg) and fitted with a Marvel-Schebler MA-6AA carburetor. Type certified on May 12, 1961.

=== TVO-435 models ===
TVO-435-A1A
Turbocharged, vertically-mounted engine model for helicopters, with a dry sump oil system. It produces 260 hp (194 kW) at 3200 rpm for takeoff, with a compression ratio of 7.3:1, a dry weight of 468 lb (212 kg) and fitted with a Marvel-Schebler MA-6AA carburetor. Type certified on May 12, 1961.
TVO-435-B1A (military designation O-435-25A)
Turbocharged, vertically-mounted engine model with internal piston cooling oil jets, for helicopters, with a dry sump oil system and cylinder assemblies machined for long-reach spark plugs. It produces 270 hp (201 kW) at 3200 rpm for takeoff, with a compression ratio of 7.3:1, a dry weight of 478 lb (217 kg) and fitted with a Marvel-Schebler MA-6AA carburetor. Type certified on November 21, 1962.
TVO-435-B1B
Turbocharged, vertically-mounted engine model for helicopters, with a dry sump oil system and TCM (formerly Bendix) S6RN-1208 and S6LN-1209 magnetos. It produces 270 hp (201 kW) at 3200 rpm for takeoff, with a compression ratio of 7.3:1, a dry weight of 479 lb (217 kg) and fitted with a Marvel-Schebler MA-6AA carburetor. Type certified on June 20, 1966.
TVO-435-C1A
Turbocharged, vertically-mounted engine model for helicopters, with a dry sump oil system and a T-1112 turbosupercharger. It produces 380 hp (283 kW) at 3200 rpm for takeoff, with a compression ratio of 7.3:1, a dry weight of 478 lb (217 kg) and fitted with a Marvel-Schebler MA-6AA carburetor. Type certified on November 21, 1962.
TVO-435-D1A
Turbocharged, vertically-mounted engine model for helicopters, with a dry sump oil system. It has a TK-0659 turbocharger and TCM (formerly Bendix) S6RN-1208 (retarded breaker) and S6LN-1209 magnetos. It produces 270 hp (201 kW) at 3200 rpm for takeoff, with a compression ratio of 7.3:1, a dry weight of 465 lb (211 kg) and fitted with a Marvel-Schebler MA-6AA carburetor. Type certified on March 10, 1966.
TVO-435-D1B
Turbocharged, vertically-mounted engine model for helicopters, with a dry sump oil system. It has TCM (formerly Bendix) S-200 series magnetos. It produces 270 hp (201 kW) at 3200 rpm for takeoff, with a compression ratio of 7.3:1, a dry weight of 464 lb (210 kg) and fitted with a Marvel-Schebler MA-6AA carburetor. Type certified on February 23, 1967.
TVO-435-E1A
Turbocharged, vertically-mounted engine model for helicopters, with a dry sump oil system and a Kelly Aerospace (formerly AiResearch) TK-0659 turbocharger. It produces 260 hp (194 kW) at 3200 rpm for takeoff, with a compression ratio of 7.3:1, a dry weight of 490 lb (222 kg) and fitted with a Marvel-Schebler MA-6AA carburetor. Type certified on March 7, 1967.
TVO-435-F1A
Turbocharged, vertically-mounted engine model for helicopters, with a wet sump oil system, different accessory section and a higher power rating. It produces 280 hp (209 kW) at 3200 rpm for takeoff, with a compression ratio of 7.3:1, a dry weight of 490 lb (222 kg) and fitted with a Marvel-Schebler MA-6AA carburetor. Type certified on January 22, 1968.
TVO-435-G1A
Turbocharged, vertically-mounted engine model for helicopters, with a dry sump oil system and a different automatic waste gate control setting for a higher power rating. It produces 280 hp (209 kW) at 3200 rpm for takeoff, with a compression ratio of 7.3:1, a dry weight of 465 lb (211 kg) and fitted with a Marvel-Schebler MA-6AA carburetor. Type certified on January 11, 1968.
TVO-435-G1B
Turbocharged, vertically-mounted engine model for helicopters, with a dry sump oil system and different magnetos. It produces 280 hp (209 kW) at 3200 rpm for takeoff, with a compression ratio of 7.3:1, a dry weight of 464 lb (210 kg) and fitted with a Marvel-Schebler MA-6AA carburetor. Type certified on November 25, 1968.
TVO-435-25
Turbocharged, vertically-mounted military engine model for helicopters, with a dry sump oil system. This military model is similar to the -A1A, except it has cylinder assemblies from the -B1A. It produces 260 hp (194 kW) at 3200 rpm for takeoff, with a compression ratio of 7.3:1, a dry weight of 493 lb (224 kg) and fitted with a Marvel-Schebler MA-6AA carburetor. Type certified on June 10, 1963.

== Applications ==
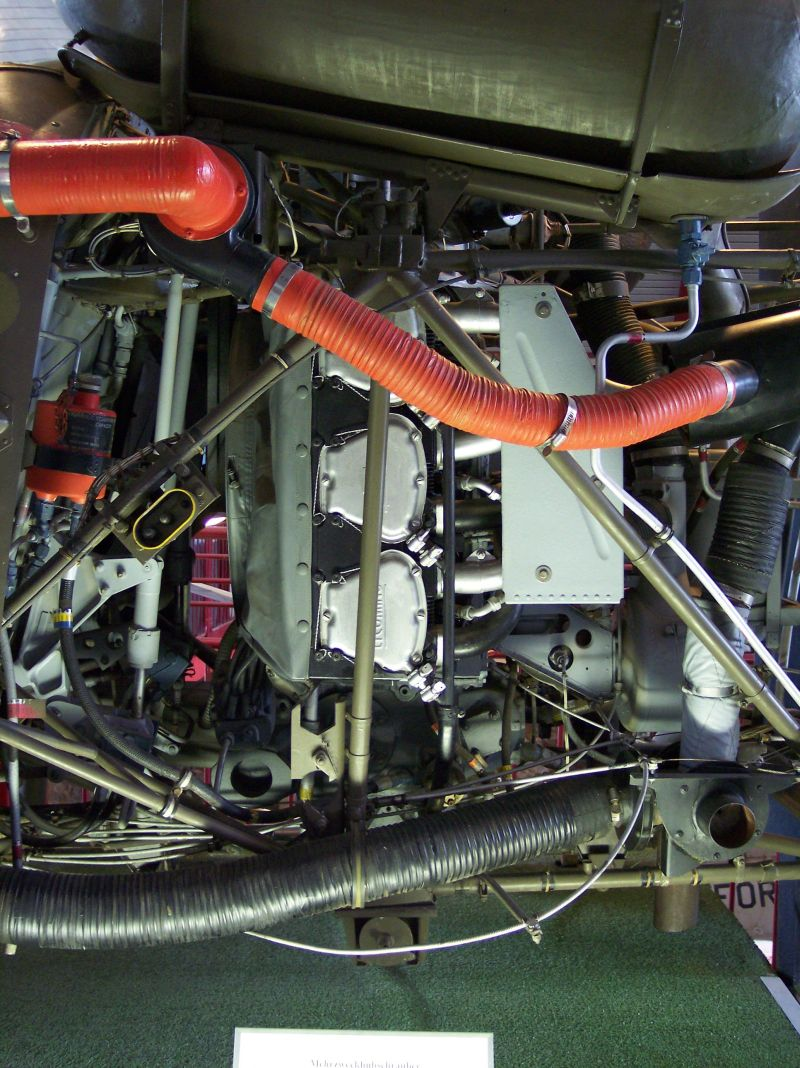
A Lycoming TVO-435 installed in a Bell 47G "Whirlybird"

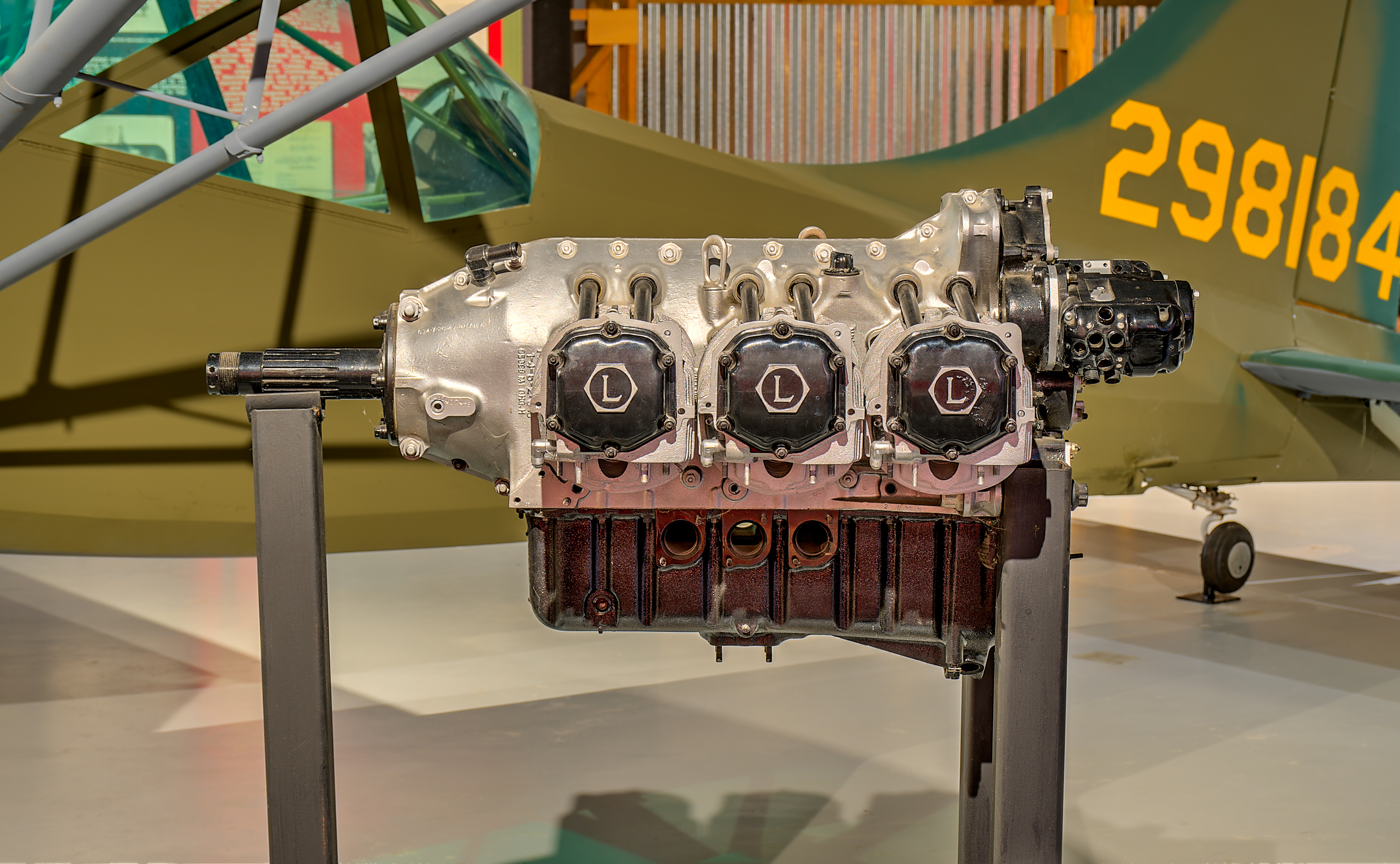
Lycoming O-435 on display at the Museum of Aviation

Aircraft

- Aero Commander 500
- AISA I-115
- Beechcraft Bonanza
- Bell 47
- Bell Wing Ding
- Bell H-13 Sioux
- Bellanca Cruisemaster
- Boisavia Mercurey
- D'Apuzzo Senior Aero Sport
- de Havilland Canada Super Chipmunk
- Fleetwings BQ-2
- Fleetwings PQ-12
- Fokker F.25
- Fokker S-11
- Helio Courier
- Hiller OH-23 Raven
- Interstate TDR
- Jeffair Barracuda
- Kaman K-190A
- Kaman K-225
- Karhumäki Karhu
- Kawasaki KAL-2
- Kawasaki KAT-1
- Kawasaki KH-4
- LIBIS KB-11
- Miles Aerovan
- Piaggio P.148
- Piaggio P.149
- Pilatus P-4
- Ra-Son Warrior
- Ryan Navion
- Saab 91 Safir
- Stinson 108
- Stinson L-5 Sentinel
- St Croix Sopwith Triplane
- UTVA Aero 3
- UTVA 56
- Vertical Hummingbird

Other

- M22 Locust - tank

== Specifications (O-435-D) ==
Data from Jane's.

=== General characteristics ===
- Type: Six-cylinder horizontally-opposed gasoline piston engine
- Bore: 4.875 in (123.8 mm)
- Stroke: 3.875 in (98.4 mm)
- Displacement: 434 cu in (7.1 L)
- Width: 33.5 in (851 mm)
- Height: 43.5 in (1,105 mm)
- Dry weight: 433 lb (196.6 kg)

=== Components ===
- Valvetrain: Overhead valve (OHV, pushrod actuated), one inlet and one exhaust valve per cylinder
- Fuel system: Marvel-Schebler carburetor
- Fuel type: 100 octane gasoline
- Oil system: Pressure pump type
- Cooling system: Air-cooled by fan (helicopter installations)
- Reduction gear: Direct-drive

=== Performance ===
- Power output: 212 hp (158 kW) at 3,000 rpm at sea level
- Compression ratio: 7.5:1

== See also ==
Related development

- Lycoming O-290

Comparable engines

- de Havilland Gipsy Queen
- Franklin O-335

Related lists

- List of aircraft engines
