= Potez 661 =

661
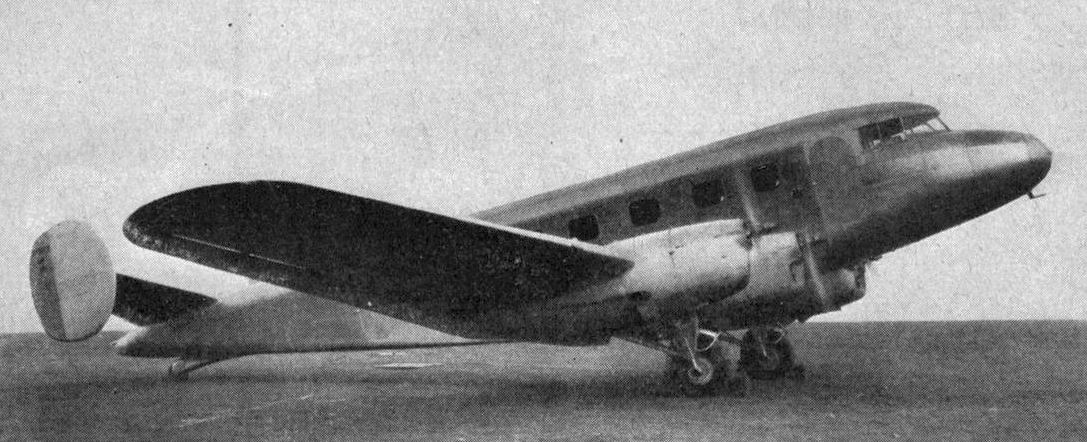

General information
- Type: Passenger transport
- National origin: France
- Manufacturer: S.N.C.A.N.
- Primary user: Air Afrique
- Number built: 2

History
- First flight: 18 July 1937

The Potez 661 was a four-engined metal low-wing monoplane airliner developed in France just before World War II. The single example flew with Air Afrique on French colonial routes.

== Design and development ==
In 1936 the well-established Potez company became part of the Société Nationale de Constructions Aéronautique du Nord (S.N.C.A.N.), under the Law for the Nationalisation of Military Industries. In 1937 they produced their first four-engined aircraft, the Type 661. This was a commercial machine with seating for up to twelve passengers. It was a low wing cantilever, almost all-metal monoplane. The wing tapered with a nearly straight trailing edge that carried outboard balanced ailerons and split trailing edge flaps over the whole of the centre section. The four 220 hp (164 kW) Renault 6Q inverted inline engines were conventionally mounted of the front wing spar and drove variable-pitch twin-bladed propellers.

The fuselage was a metal monocoque, with a port side passenger door aft of six windows on each side, one per seat. Though the standard seat arrangement was for twelve, two seats could be removed to allow the installation of chaises-longues for longer flights. The pilots' cabin was enclosed, with side by side dual control seating. The tail unit carried twin vertical endplate fins, slightly oval on a tailplane that had strong dihedral. The balanced rudders and elevators were metal structures with the only fabric covering used on the aircraft. The elevators carried trim tabs. There was a small tailwheel, the main undercarriage retracting into the inner engine nacelles.

== Operational history ==
The first flight was on 18 July 1937. By August 1938 the 661 had completed its Air Ministry tests and by April 1939 its 100 hr "endurance" tests. In mid-April it was handed over to Air Afrique and had made its first flight on the trans-Africa route from Dakar to Pointe Noire. Though only one was built before the war, it gained the reputation of being an economical transport. There were suggestions, in war-time England at least that the Potez 661 or its more powerful development the Potez 662 might be built in occupied France for German use, but there is no evidence that any more were produced.

== Variants ==
Potez 661
The initial prototype powered by 4x 160 kW (220 hp) Renault 6Q-02 air-cooled inverted in-line engines
Potez 662
A second prototype powered by 4x 490 kW (660 hp) Gnome & Rhône 14M-5 radial engines, with equal tapered outer wings to allow for changes in the centre of gravity with the heavier radial engines.

== Specifications (Potez 661) ==
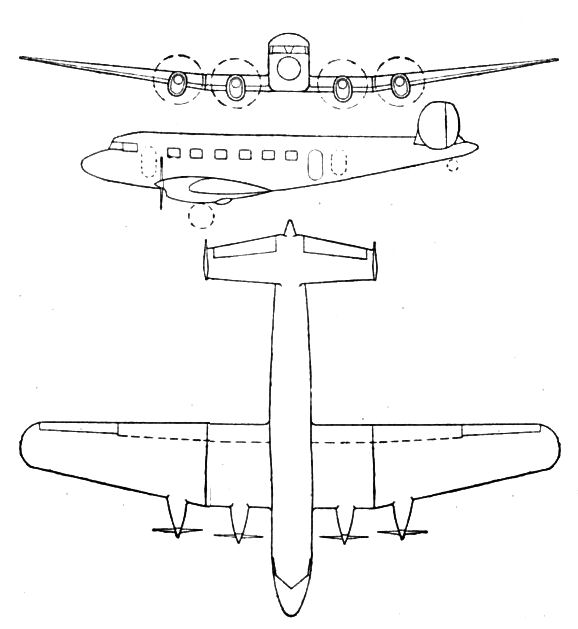
Potez 661 3-view drawing from L'Aerophile January 1938

Data from Grey 1972, pp. 110c

General characteristics

- Crew: 2
- Capacity: 12
- Length: 16.6 m (54 ft 5 in)
- Wingspan: 22.5 m (73 ft 10 in)
- Height: 4.4 m (14 ft 5 in)
- Wing area: 64 m^{2} (689 sq ft)
- Empty weight: 3,986 kg (8,788 lb)
- Gross weight: 6,326 kg (13,946 lb)
- Powerplant: 4 × Renault 6Q air cooled 6-cylinder inverted in-line , 164 kW (220 hp) each

Performance

- Maximum speed: 326 km/h (203 mph, 176 kn)
- Cruise speed: 300 km/h (186 mph, 162 kn)
- Range: 1,000 km (620 mi, 540 nmi)
