= Potez 32 =

Potez 32 and 33
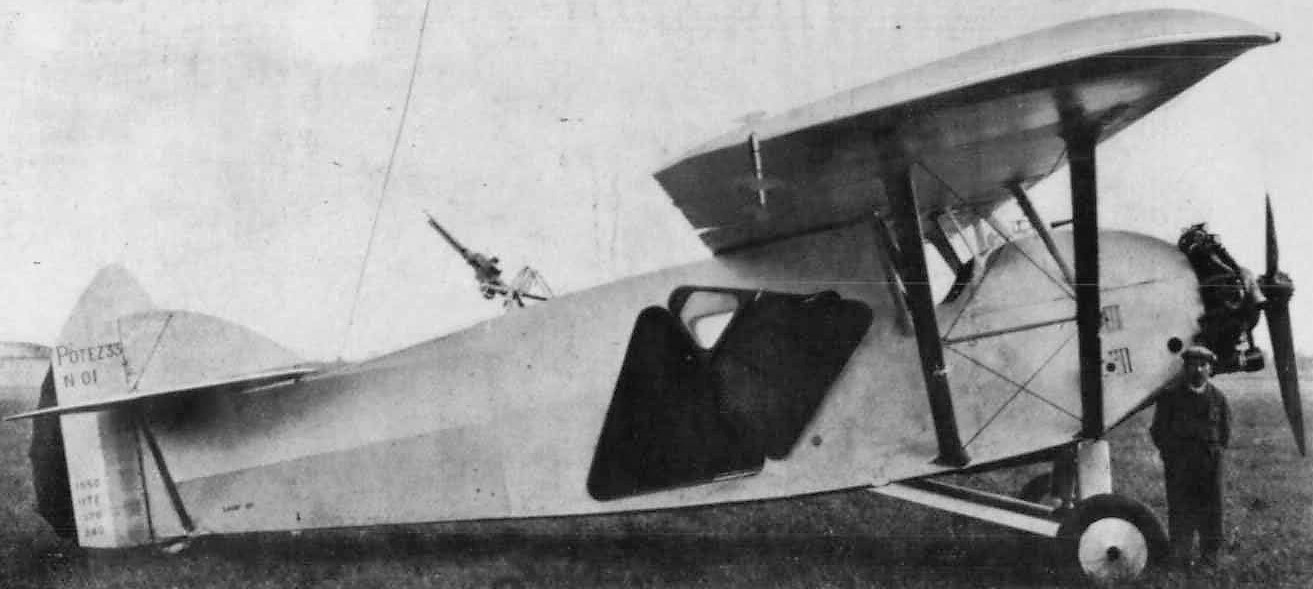
- Potez 33

General information
- Type: Transport monoplane
- National origin: France
- Manufacturer: Potez
- Primary user: French Air Force
- Number built: 102

History
- First flight: 1928
- Developed from: Potez 29

The Potez 32 and its military version the Potez 33 was a single-engine monoplane transport design and built by the French aircraft manufacturer Potez. It was the first French-built medium-sized aircraft to see active use by both domestic and foreign airlines.

The Potez 32 was based on the earlier Potez 29 biplane, sharing the same fuselage, empennage, and landing gear of the Potez 29; it differed by being a high-wing strut-braced monoplane that could be configured as either a five-passenger transport or mail plane. During 1928, the first aircraft performed its maiden flight, it was followed by 54 production aircraft. The Potez 32 was marketed towards the civil market, it quickly led to a militarized version, the Potez 33.

The Potez 33, which first flown in 1928, was designed for roles such a liaison / observation aircraft or could be used as a pilot or observer trainer. The Potez 33 was fitted with dual controls and foldable seating for trainees and an instructor. The cabin featured a floor hatch and large windows that lent themselves to observation and photo reconnaissance duties. It could also be fitted with armaments, such as a dorsal machine gun and light bombs upon under-fuselage racks.

== Development ==
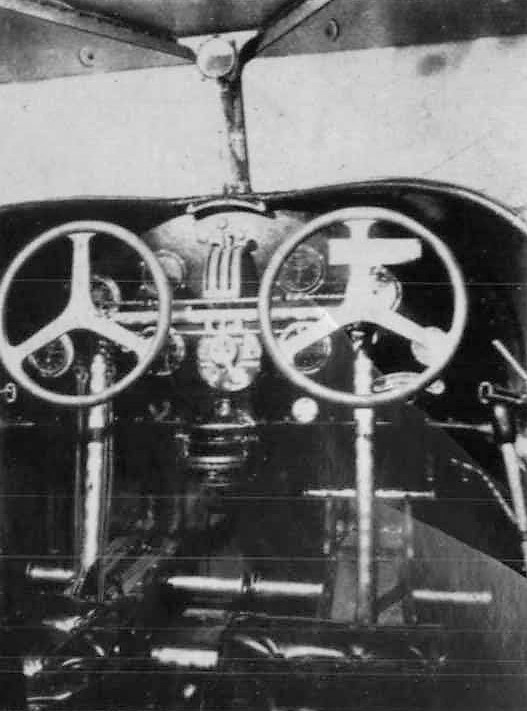
Cockpit of a Potez 33, circa 1929

The Potez 32/33 was a relatively manoeuvrable and adaptable single-engine monoplane, suitable for performing both peacetime and wartime activities. Roles that the aircraft could be readily used for included as a trainer aircraft (for both pilots and observers), a Liaison aircraft, and as an air ambulance. Features such as its low landing speed enabled it to make use of austere landing strips and even unprepared fields. The Potez 33's flying characteristics remained similar to those of the commercial Potez 32.

The cockpit of the Potez 33 accommodated two pilots seated side-by-side, both being furnished with flying controls. In front of the pilot was an instrumentation panel with various gauges to display information such as the airspeed indicator, altimeter, turn indicator, oil temperature, and fuel level gauge. Other instrumentation, such as a compass and drift indicator were mounted in a position where they could be readily observed by both the pilot and navigator. A second drift indicator was also fitted in the cabin to aid in the instruction of student observers. The aircraft was comprehensively outfitted to conduct night time flights. Furthermore, the equipment fitout was designed to be customisable by the operator to make use of the space as to best suit their requirements; specifically, special fittings in the cabin enabled the aircraft's rapid conversion into an air ambulance configuration, capable of transporting two wounded personnel in a reclined position, a single wounded person sitting, and a single attendant.

The Potez 33 could be equipped with various armaments. A pair of machine guns could be installed in a balanced Scarff mount fitted to the upper rear portion of the cabin; this position had a relatively small dead angle (area that cannot be seen or defended by the gunner) due to the elevated position of the wing. It was also furnished with a pilot-operated Optique & Précision de Levallois gun camera gun, the controls for which being placed directly above the instrumentation panel. Bombing apparatus consisted of a Services de Technologies Industrielles Atlantique (STIA) bombsight and a vertical bomb rack that could accommodate up to twelve 10-kilogram (22-pound) bombs within the cabin. For external observation purposes, the cabin features relatively large windows; engine noise is also dampened somewhat by the cabin's wooden walls, to the extent that students could readily hear the guidance delivered to them by their instructor.

The cabin's size permitted many tasks to be accomplished in relatively comfortable conditions in comparison to the majority of contemporary aircraft then in military use. The crew were provided with folding seats, as well as a table for use during flight. The pilots were enclosed and thus protected from inclement weather conditions. Assisted by these myriad design aspects, lengthy flights could be conducted without incurring undue fatigue amongst the crew. Vertical photographs could be taken via a hatch in the cabin floor while oblique images could be taken via an orifice in the left wall of the cabin; customisable supports were provided so that all types of cameras then in use with the French Army could be used. An onboard radio set was also installed in the forward portion of the cabin, messages across which could be sent either from the cabin or from the navigator's position. Alternative communication methods included the use of up to eight signal rockets via a detachable rocket discharging tube.

== Variants ==
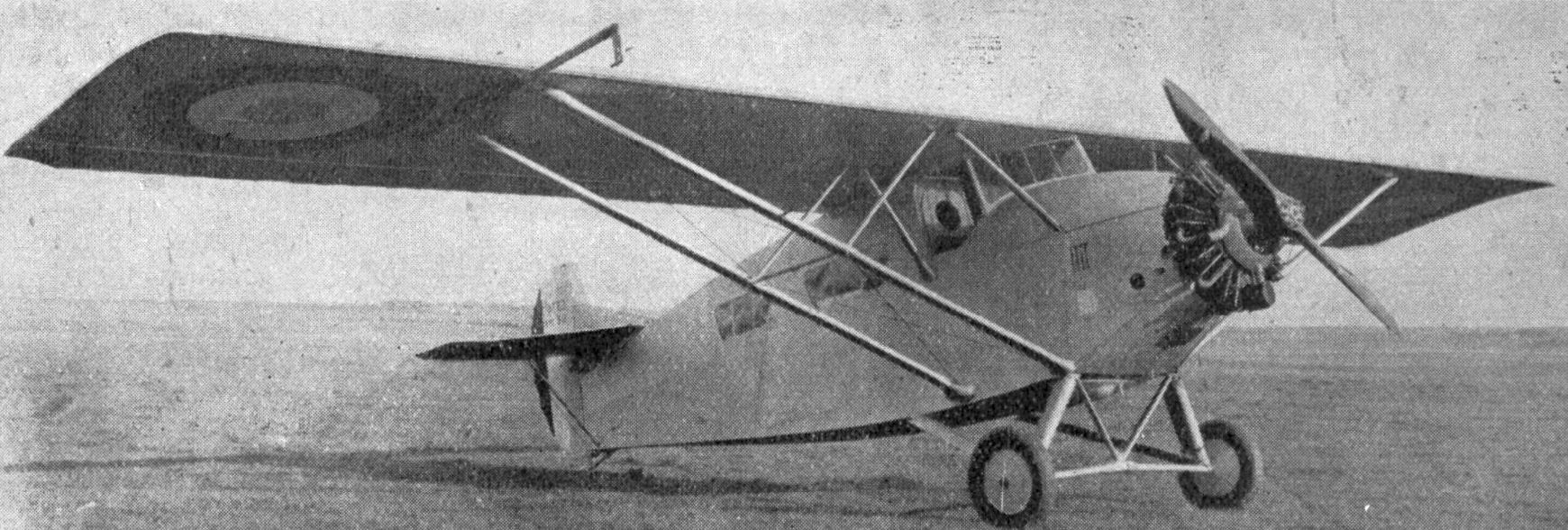
Potez 32 photo from L'Aérophile November 1927

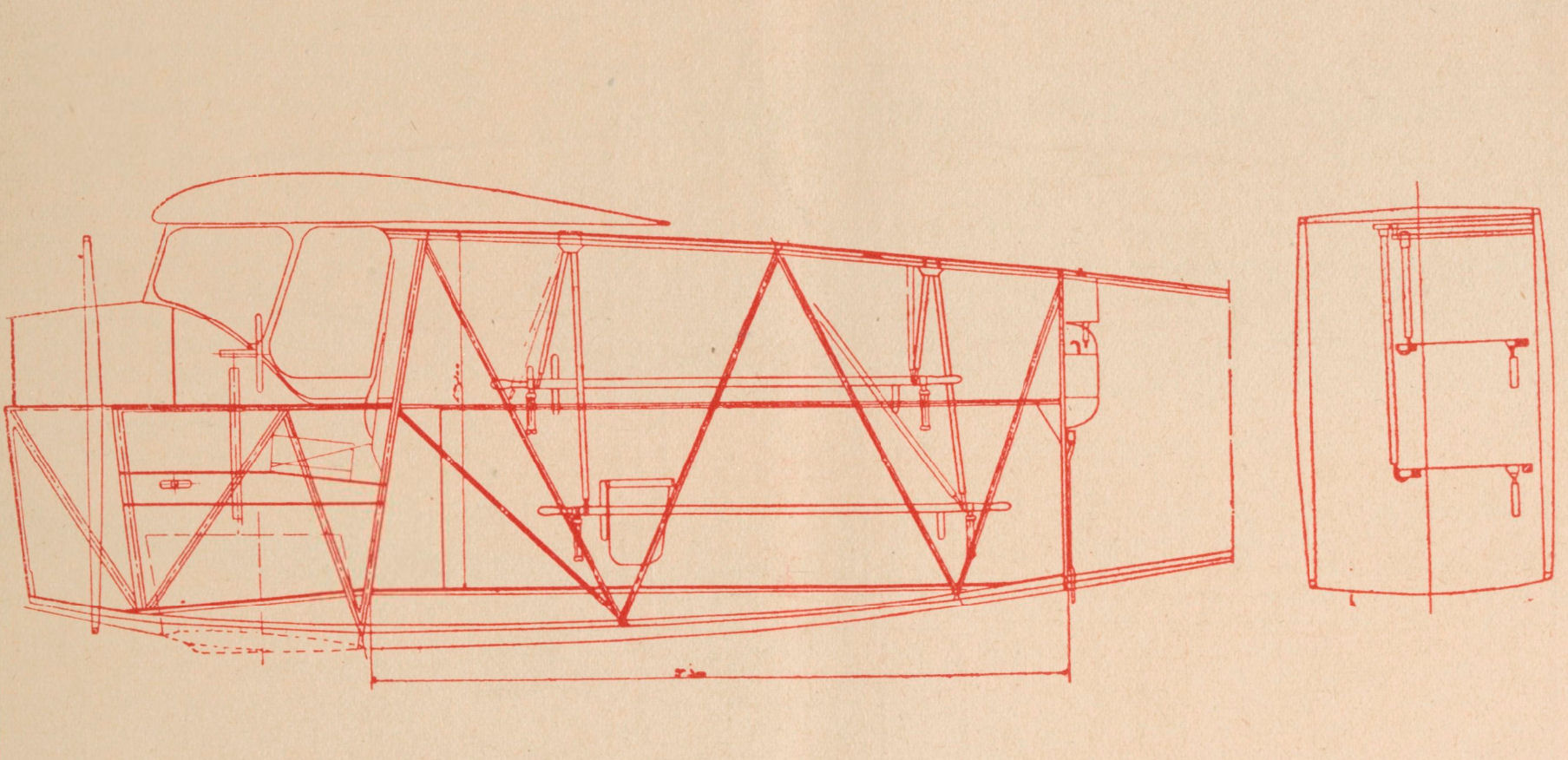
Drawing of a Potez cabin layout

Potez 32
Civil variant powered by a Salmson 9Ab engine, prototype and 31 production aircraft.
Potez 32/2
Civil variant powered by a 171 kW (230 hp) Lorraine 7Ma engine, one built.
Potez 32/3
Civil export variant for Canada with a 164 kW (220 hp) Wright J-5 radial engine, seven built.
Potez 32/4
Civil variant powered by a 283 kW (380 hp) Gnome-Rhône 9A and a small increase in wing area, nine built and five converted for Potez 32.
Potez 32/5
Experimental variant with a Hispano-Suiza 9Qd engine, one built.
Potez 33/1
Military variant with a 171 kW (230 hp) Lorraine 7Me, two built for Portugal.
Potez 33/2
Military production variant with a Salmson 9Ab, 40 built for Brazilian and French Air Forces.
Potez 33/3
Military variant for Belgium with a 224 kW (300 hp) Gnome-Rhône 7Kdrs radial, four built.
Potez 33/4
Military variant for Belgium with a 224 kW (300 hp) Lorraine Algol 9Na, eight built.

== Operators ==
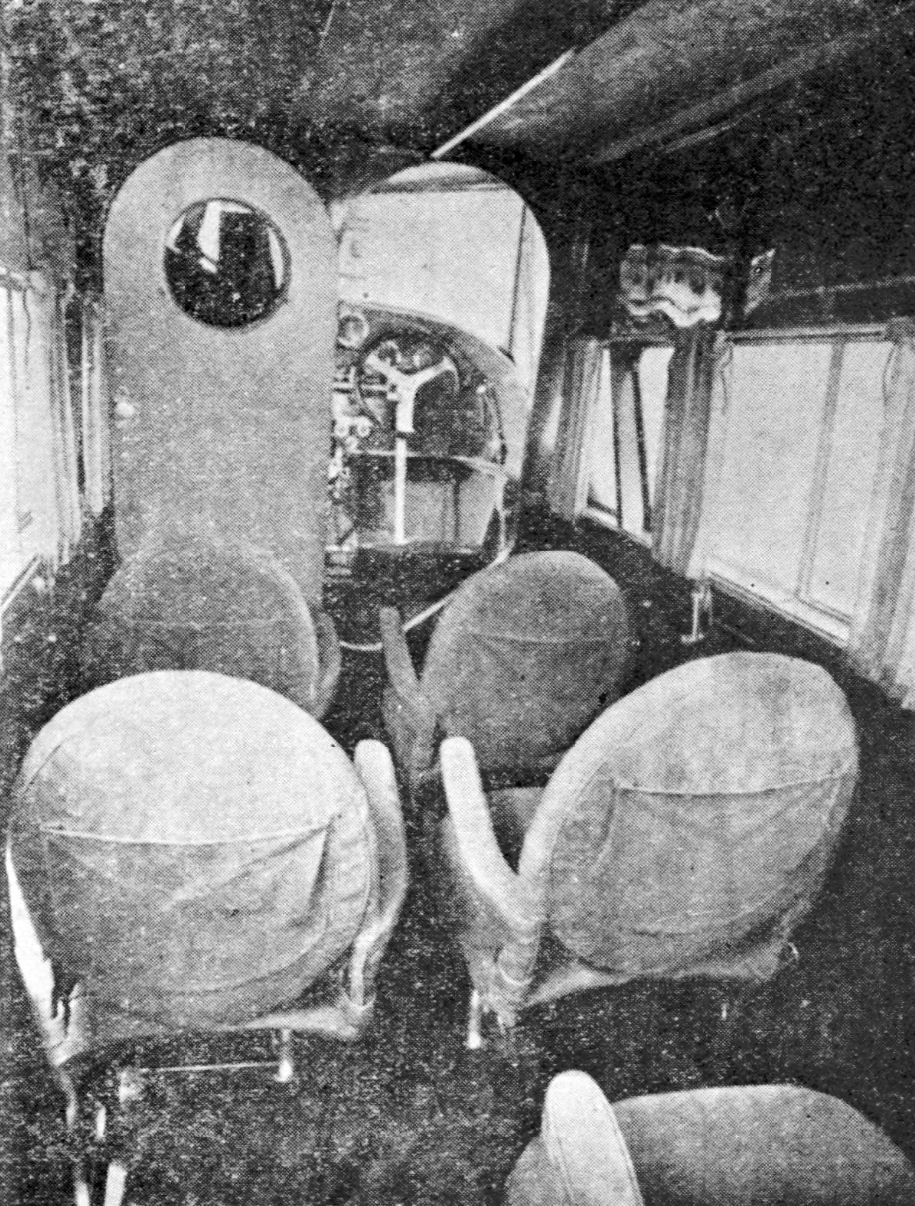
View from inside the cabin looking forwards, circa 1929

=== Potez 32 civil operators ===
Canada
France

- Aéropostale
- Air Orient
- CIDNA

=== Potez 33 military operators ===
Belgium

- Belgian Air Force

Brazil

- Brazilian Air Force

France

- French Air Force

Portugal

- Portuguese Air Force

== Specifications (Potez 33/2) ==
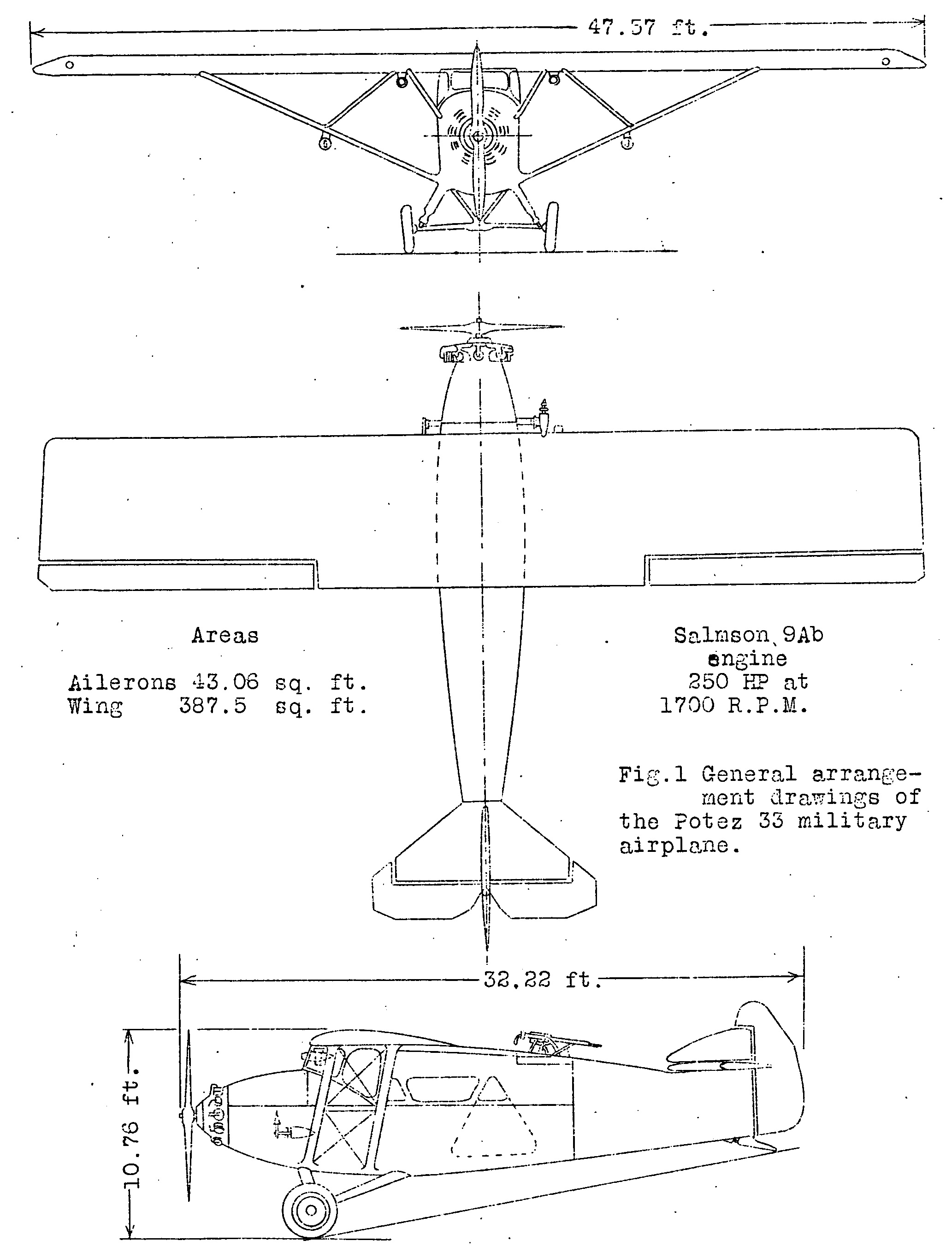
Potez 33 3-view drawing from NACA Aircraft Circular No.96

Data from Jane's all the World's Aircraft 1928, N.A.C.A

General characteristics

- Crew: Two (pilot and crew member)
- Capacity: Four passengers (Potez 32)
- Length: 10.15 m (33 ft 4 in)
- Wingspan: 14.5 m (47 ft 7 in)
- Height: 4 m (13 ft 1 in)
- Wing area: 35 m^{2} (380 sq ft)
- Empty weight: 950 kg (2,094 lb)
- Gross weight: 1,750 kg (3,858 lb)
- Powerplant: 1 × Salmson 9Ab nine-cylinder air-cooled radial piston engine, 170 kW (230 hp)
- Propellers: 2-bladed fixed pitch propellers

Performance

- Maximum speed: 190 km/h (120 mph, 100 kn)
- Cruise speed: 150 km/h (93 mph, 81 kn)
- Range: 670 km (420 mi, 360 nmi)
- Service ceiling: 4,500 m (14,800 ft)
- Wing loading: 50 kg/m^{2} (10 lb/sq ft)
- Power/mass: 0.0978 kW/kg (0.0595 hp/lb)

Armament

- Guns: 2 × 7.7 mm (0.303 in) Lewis machine gun on a ring mount.
- Bombs: 12x 10 kg (22 lb) bombs in internal bomb-bay

Avionics
radio equipment and aerial cameras
