= Potez 43 =

Family of French light utility and sports aircraft

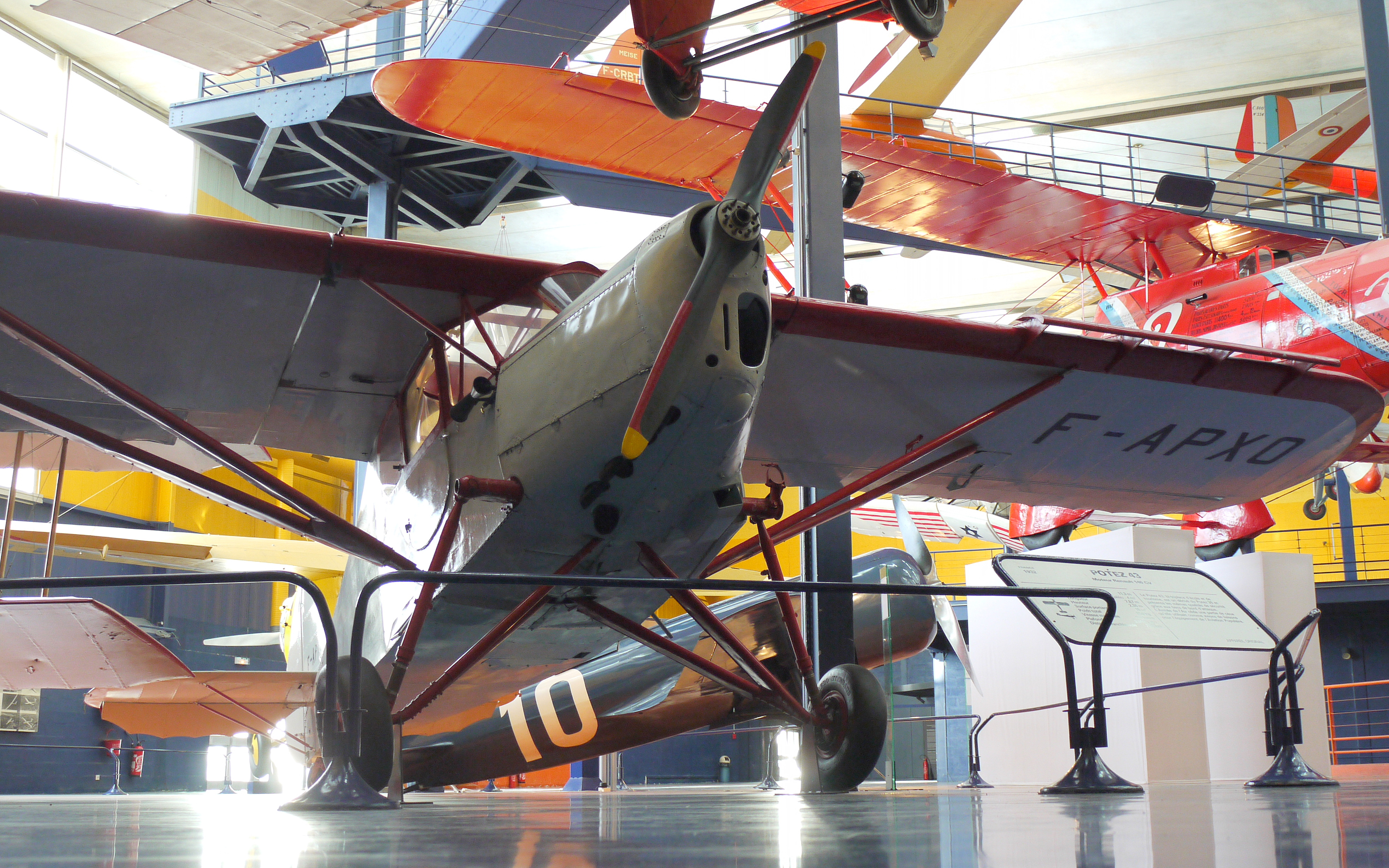
- The Potez 43 at Musée de l'Air et de l'Espace.

General information
- Type: Sports and utility plane
- Manufacturer: Potez
- Primary user: France
- Number built: 161

History
- Manufactured: 1932-1934
- Introduction date: 1932
- First flight: June 1932

The Potez 43 was a family of French light utility and sports aircraft, developed in early 1930s. They were three-seat single-engine high-wing monoplanes.

== Design and development ==
The plane was a development of Potez 36. First of all it featured new, slimmer fuselage, with three seats, instead of two. A disadvantage were non-folding wings, with shorter slats. The original Potez 430 first flew in June 1932, powered by a 78 kW (105 hp) Potez 6Ас radial engine. 25 examples of this variant were completed, followed by other variants, differing with the last digit in designation. Other variants built in significant numbers were Potez 431 and Potez 438. 161 of Potez 43 family were built in total.

== Operational service ==
Two Potez 430s (registrations: F-AMBM and F-AMBN) took part in the Challenge 1932 international tourist plane contest. Pierre Duroyon took the 22nd place (for 43 starting and 24 finishing crews), while Georges Detre was disqualified due to low cruise speed.

== Variants ==
Potez 430
First version, 78 kW (105 hp) Potez 6Ас engine, 25 built.
Potez 431
Modified series version of 1933, Potez 6Ас engine, 60 built.
Potez 432
Version with 75 kW (100 hp) Renault 4Pei engine, 3 built (first flew 21 April 1933).
Potez 434
Version with 89 kW (120 hp) de Havilland Gipsy Major I straight engine, 9 built (first flew 2 November 1933).
Potez 435
Version with 89 kW (120 hp) Renault 4Pdi engine, 11 built (first flew 23 June 1933).
Potez 436
Potez 437
Modified version with 89 kW (120 hp) Renault 4Pdi engine, 9 built (first flew 17 July 1934).
Potez 438
Military trainer and liaison version with 89 kW (120 hp) Renault 4Pdi engine and a tail wheel, of 1934. 40 built (according to other sources, 33).
Potez 439

== Operators ==
France

- French Air Force

== Specifications (Potez 430) ==
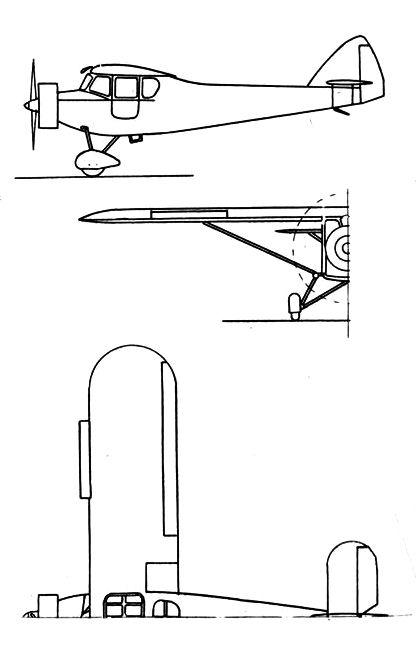
Potez 43 3-view drawing from L'Aerophile Salon 1932

Mixed construction strutted high-wing monoplane. A steel framed fuselage covered with canvas. Rectangular two-spar wing, with rounded ends, of wooden construction, canvas covered. Wings were equipped with slats on 1/3 span and supported with main V-shaped struts. Closed cabin with three seats, well glazed. Engine in front, two-blade propeller. Conventional fixed landing gear, with a rear skid, wheels in teardrop covers.

Data from Aviafrance: Potez 430

General characteristics

- Crew: 1
- Capacity: 2 passengers / 330 kg (728 lb) payload
- Length: 7.65 m (25 ft 1 in)
- Wingspan: 11.3 m (37 ft 1 in)
- Height: 2.36 m (7 ft 9 in)
- Wing area: 18 m^{2} (190 sq ft)
- Empty weight: 470 kg (1,036 lb)
- Gross weight: 800 kg (1,764 lb)
- Powerplant: 1 × Potez 6Ac 6-cylinder 2-row air-cooled radial piston engine, 78 kW (105 hp)
- Propellers: 2-bladed fixed-pitch propeller

Performance

- Maximum speed: 160 km/h (99 mph, 86 kn)
- Cruise speed: 140 km/h (87 mph, 76 kn)
- Stall speed: 60 km/h (37 mph, 32 kn) ~
- Range: 800 km (500 mi, 430 nmi)
- Service ceiling: 5,000 m (16,000 ft)
- Wing loading: 44.4 kg/m^{2} (9.1 lb/sq ft)
- Power/mass: 0.094 kW/kg (0.057 hp/lb)
- Take-off distance to 8 m (26 ft): 156.5 m (513 ft)
- Landing distance from 8 m (26 ft): 102.8 m (337 ft)

== See also ==
Related development

- Potez 36 - Potez 51 - Potez 58

Aircraft of comparable role, configuration, and era

- RWD-6 - RWD-13 - de Havilland Puss Moth - Comte AC-12 - Monocoupe 110

== Bibliography ==
- Comas, Mathieu (September 1999). "La débacle des ambulanciers... ou l'histoire inconnu d'une section d'avions ambulanciers en mai-juin 1940" [Debacle of the Ambulances: Or the Unknown History of an Aerial Ambulance Section in May–June 1940]. Avions: Toute l'Aéronautique et Son Histoire (in French) (78): 18–21. ISSN 1243-8650.
