= Potez 58 =

Family of French light utility and touring aircraft

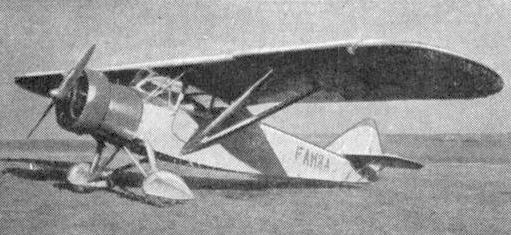

General information
- Type: Utility and touring aircraft
- Manufacturer: Potez
- Primary user: France
- Number built: ~202

History
- Manufactured: 1934–1938
- First flight: 7 March 1934

The Potez 58 was a family of French light utility and touring aircraft, developed in mid-1930s. They were three-seat single-engine high-wing monoplanes.

== Design and development ==
The plane was a further development of Potez 43 family, tracing its roots from Potez 36. An airframe changed little from Potez 43, main difference were stronger engines. A prototype Potez 58 first flew on 7 March 1934. In September 1934 the first serial variant Potez 580 was flown, powered with 120 hp radial engine Potez 6B. There were built 80 of this variant. An air ambulance variant was also evaluated.

There were next built several small-series variants, differing with the last digit in designation. The second variant built in a significant series was Potez 585 – 108 built.

Mixed construction strutted high-wing monoplane. Rectangular two-spar wing, with rounded ends, supported with V-shaped spars. Wings were equipped with slats on 1/3 span. Closed cabin with three seats. Radial engine in front, with a Townend ring, two-blade propeller. Conventional fixed landing gear, with a rear skid, wheels in teardrop covers.

== Operational history ==
French Air Force operated 99 Potez 585 as liaison aircraft.

== Variants ==
Potez 58
Prototype.
Potez 580
First series variant of 1934, 89 kW (120 hp) Potez 6B engine; 80 built.
Potez 582
Potez 584
Variant with 89 kW (120 hp) de Havilland Gipsy Major I straight engine; 4 built in 1935.
Potez 585
Liaison and utility aircraft, 97 kW (130 hp) Potez 6Ba engine; 108 built.
Potez 586
Four-seater variant; 10 built in 1936–1937.

== Operators ==
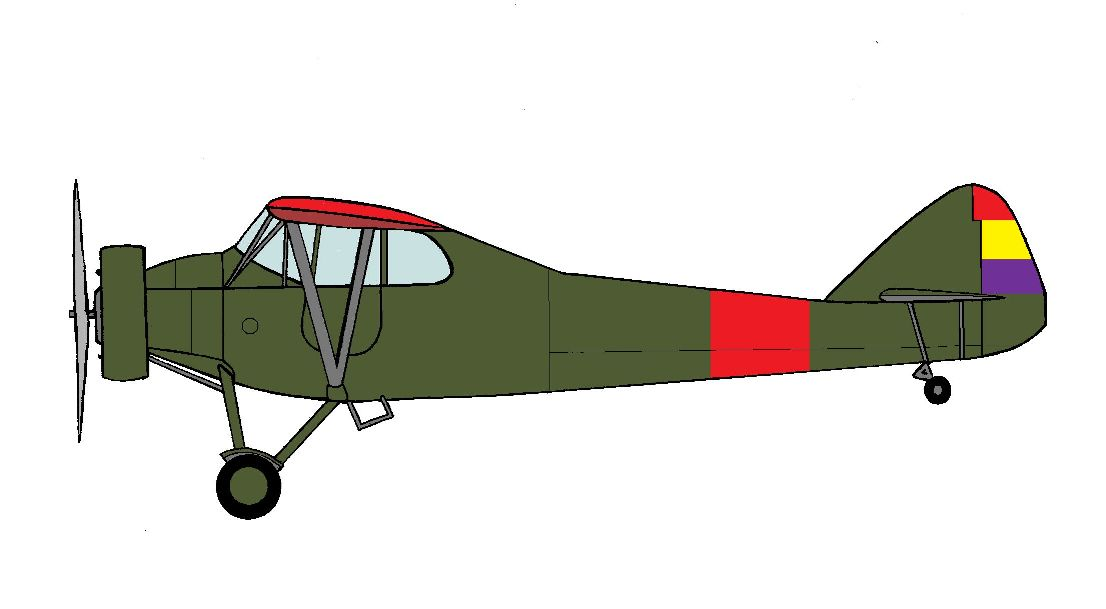
Potez 58 of the Spanish Republican Air Force.

France

- French Air Force

Spain

- Spanish Republican Air Force

== Specifications (Potez 585) ==
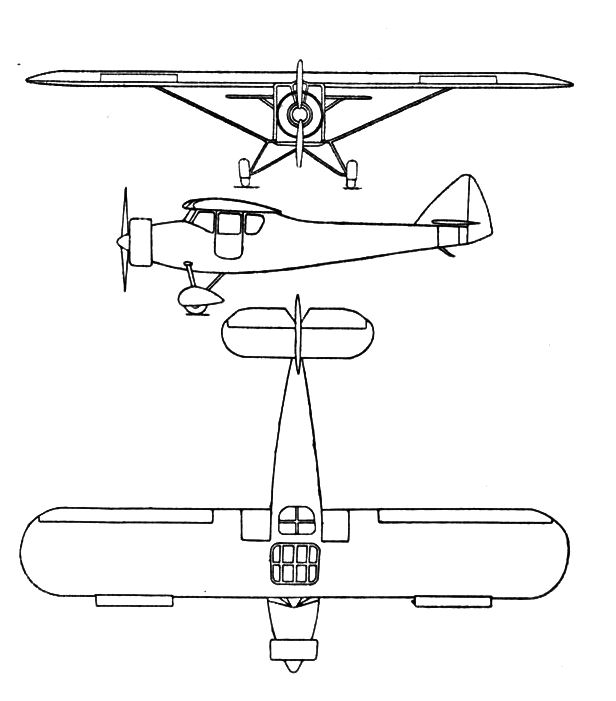
Potez 58 3-view drawing from L'Aerophile February 1938

Data from

General characteristics

- Crew: 1
- Capacity: 2 passengers
- Length: 7.44 m (24 ft 5 in)
- Wingspan: 11.3 m (37 ft 1 in)
- Height: 2.36 m (7 ft 9 in)
- Wing area: 19 m^{2} (200 sq ft)
- Empty weight: 515 kg (1,135 lb)
- Max takeoff weight: 906 kg (1,997 lb)
- Powerplant: 1 × Potez 6Ba 6-cylinder 2-row air-cooled radial piston engine, 97 kW (130 hp)
- Propellers: 2-bladed fixed-pitch propeller

Performance

- Maximum speed: 190 km/h (120 mph, 100 kn)
- Cruise speed: 160 km/h (99 mph, 86 kn)
- Range: 750 km (470 mi, 400 nmi)
- Service ceiling: 6,000 m (20,000 ft)

== See also ==
Related development

- Potez 36
- Potez 43

Aircraft of comparable role, configuration, and era

- RWD-9
- RWD-13
- de Havilland Leopard Moth
- Monocoupe 110

Related lists

- List of aircraft of World War II
- List of aircraft of the Spanish Republican Air Force
- List of Interwar military aircraft

== Bibliography ==
- Mombeek, Eric (May 2001). "Les trésors de Cazaux" [The Treasures of Cazaux]. Avions: Toute l'Aéronautique et son histoire (in French) (98): 44–47. ISSN 1243-8650.
