= Potez 650 =

Type of aircraft

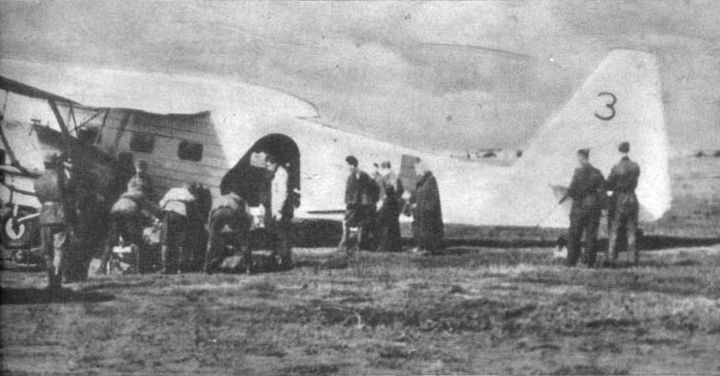

General information
- Type: military transport
- Manufacturer: Aéroplanes Henry Potez
- Primary user: French Air Force
- Number built: 15

History
- Introduction date: 1937
- Retired: 1943
- Developed from: Potez 62

The Potez 650 was a French-built military transport aircraft that saw service in World War II. Derived from the Potez 62 airliner, the 650 was specifically built for paratrooper units.

== Development ==
The Potez 62 was a high-wing twin-engine monoplane. The construction mode was not fully metallic, but used wood for the fuselage and a fabric-covered metal structure for the wings. Undercarriage was retracting, but there were no flaps, which the large wing area with thick airfoil made unnecessary, obviously at the expense of speed. Nevertheless, it was a major improvement over earlier airliners: the passengers for the first time in France enjoyed noise reduction and heating of the cabin. It was, by all accounts, considered trouble-free, safe and comfortable. The type however did not have a very long career, as it was quickly made obsolete by more modern and much faster airliners such as the Bloch MB.220 and the Dewoitine D.338.

The Potez 650 only received relatively minor modifications: Hispano-Suiza 12X liquid-cooled inline engines instead of the Gnome-Rhône 14K radials, a less sophisticated cabin with accommodation for 14 paratroopers and their equipment (one squad) or 10 wounded (for the medevac role), and a larger door system for bulky loading (transport role). The first paradrop from a Potez 650 occurred in May 1937.

== Operational service ==
The French military high-command did not have grandiose plans for paratroopers, which did not fit well with its essentially defensive doctrine of the pre-World War II era. Because of this, only two paratrooper companies were formed, and never reached full theoretical strength, and only 15 Potez 650s were manufactured. They were not sufficient in numbers even for such a small number of men, so the big Farman 224 airliner which had just been refused by Air France was pressed into military service.

A combat mission was planned as part of the Allied entry in the Netherlands in the case of a German attack, but the plan was cancelled, and eventually no combat paradrops took place in 1939–1940.

After the armistice, paratrooper units were officially disbanded, although training jumps were performed from time to time in North Africa. The Potez 650s were transferred to a military transport unit. When Free French and British forces attacked the French protectorates of Syria and Lebanon in mid-1941, the Vichy government established an airbridge to resupply its troops in the Middle East. Potez 650s took a significant share of the work, alongside converted bombers (Farman 223.3s) and airliners (Dewoitine 338s).

== Derivative: Potez 651 ==
In late 1936, the Romanian Air Force expressed interest in acquiring foreign military aircraft. The Potez 650 was selected, but Romania required Gnome-Rhône 14K engines to be fitted like originally on the Potez 62, since a license to manufacture these engines had already been acquired by Industria Aeronautică Română. Six examples of this new variant, designated Potez 651 were ordered in 1937, although it seems only four were operationally used. Originally ordered as bombers, the Romanian Potez 651s were relegated to transport duties during World War II. Three examples were still in service in May 1944.

== Variants ==
Potez 65, Potez 650 TT
Original designations of the Potez 650.
Potez 650
Twin-engined troop transport aircraft for the French Air Force.
Potez 651
Twin-engined bomber-transport aircraft for Romania, powered by 2x Gnome-Rhône 14K radial engines.

== Operators ==
France

- French Air Force - (Potez 650)

Vichy France

- Vichy French Air Force

Kingdom of Romania

- Royal Romanian Air Force (Potez 651)

== Specifications (Potez 650) ==
General characteristics

- Length: 17.32 m (56 ft 10 in)
- Wingspan: 22.45 m (73 ft 8 in)
- Height: 3.9 m (12 ft 10 in)
- Wing area: 76 m^{2} (820 sq ft)
- Empty weight: 4,632 kg (10,212 lb)
- Max takeoff weight: 7,500 kg (16,535 lb)
- Powerplant: 1 × Hispano-Suiza 12Xgrs1 liquid-cooled V-12 piston engine, 540 kW (720 hp) (right hand rotation)
- Powerplant: 1 × Hispano-Suiza 12Xhrs1 liquid-cooled V-12 piston engine, 540 kW (720 hp) (left hand rotation)

Performance

- Maximum speed: 300 km/h (190 mph, 160 kn) at 2,000 m (6,600 ft)
- Cruise speed: 250 km/h (160 mph, 130 kn) at 2,000 m (6,600 ft)
- Range: 1,200 km (750 mi, 650 nmi)

== See also ==
- List of aircraft of World War II
- List of aircraft of the French Air Force during World War II
