= Potez 220 =

General information
- Type: Reconnaissance aircraft
- National origin: France
- Manufacturer: Société Nationale de Constructions Aéronautiques du Nord (SNCAN)
- Status: Prototype
- Number built: 2

History
- First flight: 7 April 1939

The Potez 220 was a prototype French twin-engined, three-seat reconnaissance and army cooperation aircraft. Two examples were built in 1939, but no production followed.

== Design and development ==
On 6 February 1937, the French air ministry issued specification A.24 for a three-seat reconnaissance and army-cooperation aircraft. To meet this requirement, the nationalised Société Nationale de Constructions Aéronautiques du Nord (SNCAN), formed in January 1937 from ANF Les Mureaux, Potez, Chantiers Aéro-Maritimes de la Seine and parts of Breguet and Amiot, gave the task to the design team inherited from Les Mureaux. Their design, the Potez 220 (Note: All SNCAN designs, no matter what part of the conglomerate they originated from, were named as Potez aircraft owing to the prestige associated with the name. The type number was in the Les Mureaux sequence.) was a twin-engined monoplane of all-metal construction. The fuselage was an oval-section monocoque, which accommodated the aircraft's crew of three, consisting of a pilot, a radio operator gunner and an observer, with a glazed gondola slung under the fuselage provided for the observer. It was powered by two 520 kW (700 hp) Gnome-Rhône 14M radial engines driving three-bladed propellers, which were fed from fuel tanks located within the wing. A retractable tailwheel undercarriage was fitted.

The first prototype made its maiden flight at Sartrouville on 7 April 1939, with the second prototype following on 20 October that year. Performance was slightly better than the Potez 63.11, which had recently entered production in the reconnaissance role, while orders had also been placed for the much more powerful and better-performing Bloch 174 and Martin 167F aircraft to meet the same requirement as the Potez 220. Development of the type was therefore abandoned.

== Specifications ==
Data from War Planes of the Second World War: Volume Eight: Bombers and Reconnaissance Aircraft

General characteristics

- Crew: 3
- Length: 11.18 m (36 ft 8 in)
- Wingspan: 15.37 m (50 ft 5 in)
- Height: 3.67 m (12 ft 0 in)
- Wing area: 34.40 m^{2} (370.3 sq ft)
- Empty weight: 2,973 kg (6,554 lb)
- Gross weight: 4,511 kg (9,945 lb)
- Powerplant: 2 × Gnome-Rhône 14M 4/5 14-cylinder air-cooled radial engines, 520 kW (700 hp) each

Performance

- Maximum speed: 450 km/h (280 mph, 240 kn) at 4,000 m (13,120 ft)
- Range: 1,600 km (994 mi, 864 nmi)
- Time to altitude: 6.25 min to 4,000 m (13,120 ft)

Armament

- Guns:
  - 2× fixed, forward-firing 7.5 mm MAC 1934 machine guns
  - 1× flexibly mounted 7.5 mm machine gun in dorsal position
  - 1× flexibly mounted 7.5 mm machine gun in ventral position
- Bombs: four 50 kg (110 lb) bombs under wings

== Bibliography ==
- Green, William (1967). War Planes of the Second World War: Volume Eight: Bombers and Reconnaissance Aircraft. London: Macdonald & Co.
- Gunston, Bill (2005). World Encyclopedia of Aircraft Manufacturers (Second ed.). Stroud, UK: Sutton Publishing. ISBN 0-7509-3981-8.
- Breffort, Dominique; Jouineau, André. French Aircraft From 1939 to 1942: Vol.2: from Dewoitine to Potez. Paris: Histoire & Collections. ISBN 2-915239-49-5.
