= Potez 38 =

General information
- Type: Eight or nine passenger transport aircraft
- National origin: France
- Manufacturer: Societe des Avions Henri Potez
- Number built: 1

History
- First flight: 1930

The Potez 38 was a French single engine, eight or nine seat passenger aircraft flown in 1930. Only one was built.

== Design and development ==
The Potez 38 was a monoplane with high wings built around wooden box spars, spruce ribs and with fabric covering. In plan the wings were rectangular out to rounded tips and they were braced to the lower fuselage longerons with streamlined V-form struts on each side. There was 3° of dihedral.

The rectangular section fuselage was built in three parts, all with tubular metal structures though of different geometries. The front and rear sections were metal covered but the central section containing the cabin was covered in plywood. The forward section contained a 600 hp (447 kW) Hispano-Suiza 12Lbr water cooled V-12 engine, driving a two bladed propeller and with its radiator near the rear of the engine on the fuselage underside. There were two 300 L (66 imp gal; 79 US gal) fuel tanks, one in each wing, and an oil tank aft of the engine fire-wall. The cockpit had low profile glazing with a windscreen of V-plan and side-by-side seating. The Potez 38 was normally flown from the lefthand seat but dual control could be added to the other. The cabin had a volume of 15 m^{3} (530 cu ft) and contained eight or nine seats and a toilet and baggage compartment. It was lit by a long, continuous window on each side and accessed by port and starboard doors at the back. The rear section of the fuselage carried a conventional tail which was wood framed and ply covered. The fin was triangular and mounted a balanced, curved edge rudder which reached down to the keel. The straight edged tailplane, strut braced to the lower fuselage, was mounted on the fin just above its base. Inset elevators gave its trailing edge an elliptical shape.

The Potez 38 had a conventional tail-skid undercarriage, fitted with brakes. Its main wheels were on legs mounted near the wing root just behind the leading edge, containing rubber shock absorbers and spread outwards to provide a wide track. The axles were each hinged to the lower fuselage on V-struts with one end further forward and one in line with the legs.

The Potez 38 first flew in late 1929 or 1930. By the end of November 1930 it had successfully completed its acceptance trials. During these it achieved a speed of 210 km/h (130 mph) After that there are few, if any, records of its activity.

== Specifications ==
Data from L'Aérophile (February 1930, p.55) Performance figures estimated

General characteristics

- Crew: One or two
- Capacity: Nine passengers
- Length: 14.80 m (48 ft 7 in)
- Wingspan: 20 m (65 ft 7 in)
- Wing area: 65 m^{2} (700 sq ft)
- Airfoil: Clark YH
- Empty weight: 2,460 kg (5,423 lb) equipped
- Gross weight: 4,000 kg (8,818 lb)
- Fuel capacity: 440 kg (970 lb)
- Powerplant: 1 × Hispano-Suiza 12Lbr , 450 kW (600 hp)
- Propellers: 2-bladed

Performance

- Maximum speed: 225 km/h (140 mph, 121 kn) approximately, at sea level
- Service ceiling: 5,200 m (17,100 ft)
- Time to altitude: 18 minutes to 3,000 m (9,843 ft)
