= SNCAC NC.510 =

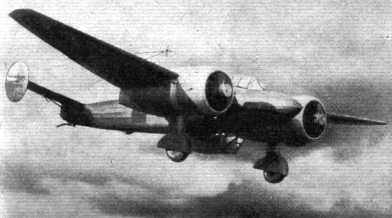
- NC.510

General information
- Type: army co-operation or advanced training aircraft
- National origin: France
- Manufacturer: Société Nationale de Constructions Aéronautique du Centre (SNCAC)
- Number built: 3

History
- First flight: 20 June 1938

The SNCAC NC.510 was a twin-engine French reconnaissance, army co-operation or advanced training aircraft, built in the late 1930s. Three were built and refined but production orders were not forthcoming.

== Design and development ==
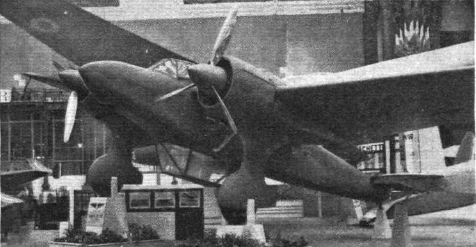
NC.510M at the December 1938 Paris Aero Show

The Société Nationale de Constructions Aéronautique du Centre (SNCAC) was formed via 1936 legislation in February 1937 as a nationalised merging of the Farman and Hanriot companies, in whose design offices several SNCAC types began. Thus the NC.510 was often referred to as the Hanriot 510 or Hanriot NC.510.

The NC.510 was designed for army co-operation work and as an advanced training aircraft. It was a twin-engined mid-wing monoplane. Between the engines and fuselage the wing was rectangular in plan and externally braced; the outboard panels were tapered cantilevers. The wings were built around two metal spars and the centre section was all metal, with metal ribs and skinning. Outboard their construction was mixed, with wooden ribs and a mixture of metal and fabric covering. Split flaps were fitted.

The fuselage consisted of two sections, both rounded in cross-section. The forward part, including the enclosed cockpit where the pilot was seated forward of the wing leading edge and an observer, provided with dual controls, behind him, was spruce framed and plywood covered. The observer could also access a long, rectangularly framed, largely transparent, ventral observation structure. The rear fuselage section was also spruce-framed but internally wire-braced and fabric-covered. A rear-facing glazed enclosure over the wing trailing edge held the rear gunner/radio operator. A transverse metal structure within the fuselage connected it to the two pairs of wing struts. There was another metal frame aft for mounting the empennage, a braced wooden structure mounted on top of the fuselage. The tailplane had significant dihedral and carried twin oval fins and rudders. Its fixed surfaces were plywood-covered; the elevators and rudders were fabric-covered with mass and aerodynamically balances. The rudders had trim tabs. The NC.510 had a fixed, conventional undercarriage with vertical, oleo shock absorber legs attached to the forward wing spar just inside the engines, braced with a strut to the rear spar. Legs and wheels were enclosed in fairings, and there was a sprung tail skid. The aircraft carried three machine guns, one fixed in the nose and one moveable in each of the rear dorsal and the ventral positions. There were racks for flares and for phosphorus bombs in addition to a mixture of handheld and remotely operated cameras for reconnaissance.

The NC.510 first flew on 20 June 1938, powered by two 574 kW (770 hp) Gnome-Rhône 9Kfr 9-cylinder air-cooled radials driving two-blade, wooden, fixed-pitch propellers. By December that year it was on display at the Paris Aero Salon with 14-cylinder 680 hp (507 kW) Gnome-Rhône 14M double-row radial engines and three-blade propellers. Though these engines had a smaller displacement than the earlier 9Ks and consequently a lower power output, they were more compact with a diameter of 0.950 m (37.4 in) compared with 1.306 m (51.4 in), reducing the engine frontal area by 47%. The cleaned-up version first flew with its new engines on 14 January 1939 and was designated the NC.510M.

A final version, the NC.530, was further aerodynamically cleaned and speeded, chiefly by the removal of the ventral gondola. It first flew on 28 June 1939. Two were completed but no production order was won.

== Variants ==
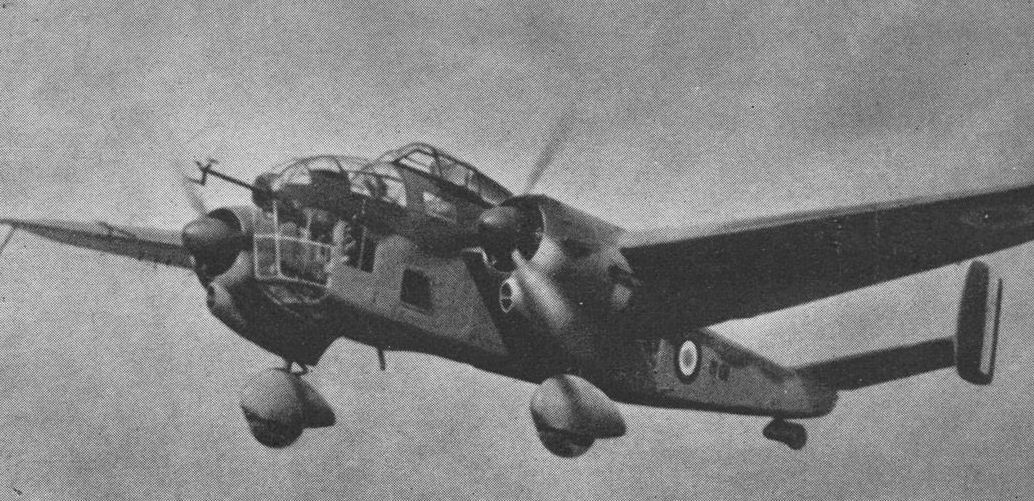
Hanriot NC.530 photo from L'Aerophile May 1940

NC.510
9-cylinder, 770 hp (574 kW) Gnome-Rhône 9Kfr radial engines. One only.
NC.510M
14-cylinder 680 hp (507 kW) Gnome-Rhône 14M radial engines. NC.510 modified, first flew 14 January 1939.
NC.530
Modified fuselage without ventral pod; engines as NC.510M. First flew 28 June 1939. Two built.

== Specifications (NC.510) ==
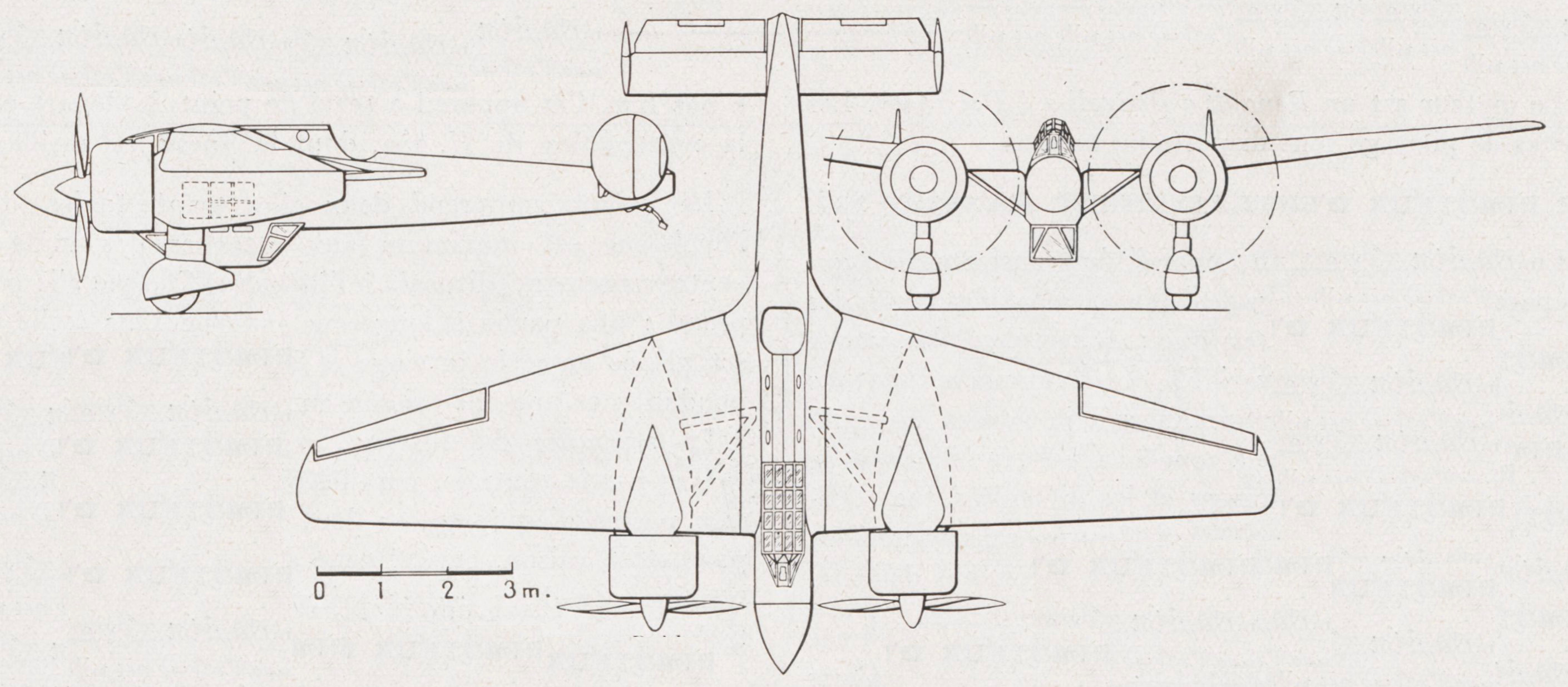
3-views of the SNCAC NC.510.

Data from Jane's All the World's Aircraft 1938 p.113-4c

General characteristics

- Crew: Three
- Length: 10.12 m (33 ft 2 in)
- Wingspan: 15.00 m (49 ft 3 in)
- Height: 2.91 m (9 ft 7 in)
- Wing area: 13.5 m^{2} (145 sq ft)
- Empty weight: 2,757 kg (6,078 lb)
- Gross weight: 3,720 kg (8,201 lb)
- Fuel capacity: 480 kg (1,058 lb)
- Powerplant: 2 × Gnome-Rhône 9Kfr 9-cylinder air-cooled radials, 570 kW (770 hp) each , rated at 3,000 m (9,840 ft)
- Propellers: 2-bladed fixed pitch, wooden

Performance

- Maximum speed: 350 km/h (220 mph, 190 kn) at 3,000 m (9,840 ft)
- Range: 1,350 km (840 mi, 730 nmi)
- Service ceiling: 7,000 m (23,000 ft) service
- Time to altitude: 6 min to 3,000 m (9,840 ft)
- Wing loading: 118 kg/m^{2} (24 lb/sq ft)
- Power/mass: 300 W/kg (0.182 hp/lb)

Armament

- Guns: 3 machine guns, one in each of nose, dorsal and ventral positions
- Bombs: racks for bombs and flares
