= Potez 51 =

General information
- Type: Intermediate training aircraft
- National origin: France
- Manufacturer: Aéroplanes Henry Potez
- Number built: 1

History
- First flight: late January 1933

The Potez 51 was a 1930s French intermediate trainer, intended to replace the ageing Potez 25 which had sold worldwide. It did not go into production.

== Design ==
Although the main rôle of the Potez 51 was as an intermediate trainer Potez, with their very successful Potez 25 in mind, hoped that it would also serve as a photographic reconnaissance aircraft, an air-ambulance and, in the civil sphere, a grand tourer.

It was a monoplane with a constant chord parasol wing with about 2.5° of sweep. The tips were semi-circular and there was a deep, rounded cut-out in the trailing edge over the cockpits. High aspect ratio ailerons occupied the whole trailing edge. The wing was built around wooden box-spars and was fabric covered. It was braced to the lower fuselage by parallel struts to the wing beyond mid-span. Four cabane struts from the upper fuselage on each side braced the wing centre section.

Its fuselage was largely wooden, with spruce longerons and ply skin, though the forward section, which contained the 130 kW (170 hp) Potez 9A radial engine, had metal bearers and removable metal sheet covering. The engine was enclosed by a NACA long chord engine cowling. Behind the engine the fuselage was flat sided, though with rounded decking both forward and aft of the two open cockpits, the forward one under the trailing edge cut-out and the other close behind. Fairings ahead of each gave protection from the slipstream and dual controls were fitted. Both fin and tailplane were essentially triangular and carried balanced control surfaces. The tailplane was mounted on top of the fuselage and its angle of incidence could be adjusted in flight; it was braced on each side at the apex of a V-strut from the lower fuselage.

The Potez 51 had fixed landing gear, with mainwheels on cranked axles and drag struts from the lower fuselage; near vertical shock absorbing legs were attached to the forward wing struts, reinforced at their tops by struts inwards to the upper fuselage. The wheels were enclosed in semi-circular fairings. There was a short tailskid.

== Development ==
The trainer was on display, unflown, at the 1932 Paris Salon. Its first flight was made towards the end of January 1933. Trials continued into 1934, though by August 1933 the aircraft was well harmonized. In November the propeller had to be modified to meet homologation requirements, as Potez had initially underestimated the full power of their new engine, 145 kW (194 hp) at 2,100 rpm. Finally in March 1934 the factory testing was done and the Potez 51 went to Villacoublay for official evaluation.

Its fate is not recorded in the contemporary French aviation journals, but it seems no more were built.

== Specifications ==
Data from Les Ailes August 1933

General characteristics

- Crew: Two
- Length: 7.60 m (24 ft 11 in)
- Wingspan: 11 m (36 ft 1 in)
- Height: 2.6 m (8 ft 6 in)
- Wing area: 19 m^{2} (200 sq ft)
- Airfoil: Clark YH
- Empty weight: 665 kg (1,466 lb)
- Gross weight: 963 kg (2,123 lb)
- Fuel capacity: 180 L (40 imp gal; 48 US gal)
- Powerplant: 1 × Potez 9A 9-cylinder radial, 130 kW (170 hp)
- Propellers: 2-bladed metal

Performance

- Maximum speed: 215 km/h (134 mph, 116 kn) at ground level and 1,000 m (3,300 ft)
- Cruise speed: 180 km/h (110 mph, 97 kn) at 2,000 m (6,600 ft)
- Minimum control speed: 90 km/h (56 mph, 49 kn)
- Range: 800 km (500 mi, 430 nmi) no reserves
- Service ceiling: 6,000 m (20,000 ft)
- Time to altitude: 9 min 20 sec to 2,000 m (6,600 ft)
