= Potez 662 =

662
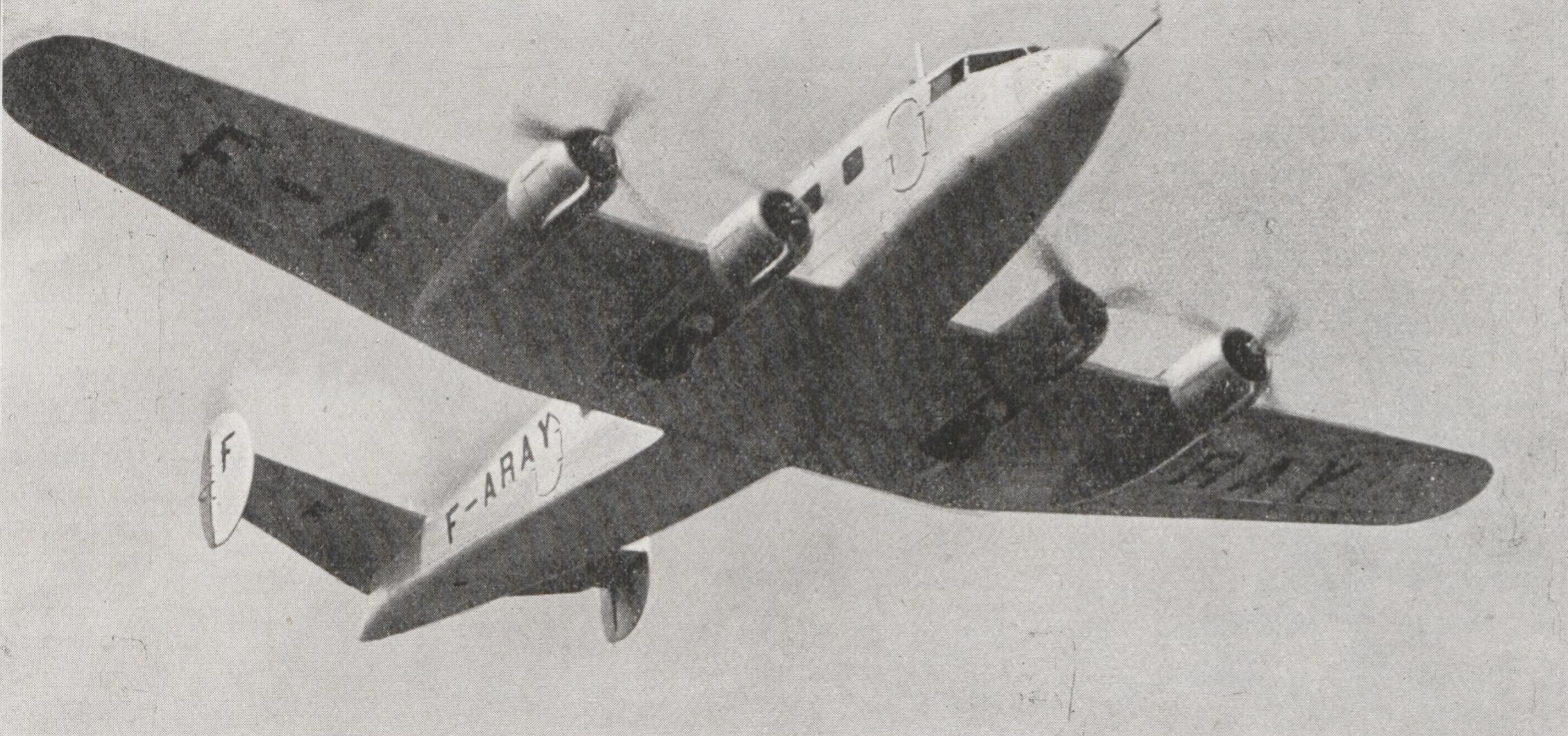
- The Potez 662 in flight, 1938

General information
- Type: 12 seat passenger transport
- National origin: France
- Manufacturer: S.N.C.A.N.
- Primary user: French Air Ministry
- Number built: 1

History
- First flight: 26 July 1938
- Developed from: Potez 661

The Potez 662 was a higher powered and faster development of the Potez 661. Like its predecessor, it was a low wing, four engine monoplane carrying 12 passengers. Only one was built, serving with the French Air Ministry.

== Design and development ==
In 1936 the well established Potez company became part of the Société Nationale de Constructions Aéronautique du Nord (S.N.C.A.N.), under the Law for the Nationalisation of Military Industries. They followed up their first four engined aircraft, the type 661 of 1937 with the Type 662, almost identical apart from having much more powerful engines In place of the 220 hp (164 kW) Renault 6-Q inverted inline engines off the 661, the 662 had 680 hp (507 kW) Gnome-Rhône 14M Mars radials and consequentially much improved performance.

The 662 was a commercial machine with seating for up to twelve passengers. It was a low wing cantilever, almost all-metal monoplane. The wing tapered with a nearly straight trailing edge that carried outboard balanced ailerons and split trailing edge flaps over the whole of the centre section. The four Mars small diameter (950 mm or 3 ft 1½ in) 14-cylinder radials were conventionally mounted of the front wing spar, neatly enclosed with wide chord cowlings and large spinners. These drove three bladed variable propellers. Internally the wing was strengthened to accommodate the greater power and the fuel tank capacity was increased by 37% to provide for the higher consumption.

The fuselage was a metal monocoque, with a port side passenger door aft of six windows on each side, one per seat. Though the standard seat arrangement was for twelve, two seats could be removed to allow the installation of chaises-longues for longer flights. The pilots' cabin was enclosed, with side by side dual control seating. The tail unit carried twin vertical endplate fins, slightly oval on a tailplane that had strong dihedral. The balanced rudders and elevators were metal structures with the only fabric covering used on the aircraft. The elevators carried trim tabs. There was a small tailwheel, the main undercarriage retracting into the inner engine nacelles.

The Potez 662 made its first flight on 26 July 1938 at Meaulte, flown by M. Labouchere who was S.C.A.N.'s chief test pilot. It made an impression at the 1938 Paris Aero Show, not least because it was the only real (as opposed to mock-ups and models) new commercial aircraft present. Despite its evidently civilian presentation, one contemporary report has it called the Potez 662 bomber; there is no evidence that such a conversion was ever considered.

Though the one 662 completed before the war was originally intended for Air France, with the expectation of orders to come, it was taken over by the French Air Ministry for its own use. It is probable that no more were built, despite speculative suggestions in Flight that it might be produced in occupied France for German use.

== Specifications ==
Data from Grey 1972, pp. 110c

General characteristics

- Crew: 2
- Capacity: 12
- Length: 13.6 m (44 ft 7 in)
- Wingspan: 22.5 m (73 ft 10 in)
- Height: 4.4 m (14 ft 5 in)
- Wing area: 64 m^{2} (689 sq ft)
- Empty weight: 5,500 kg (12,125 lb)
- Gross weight: 8,380 kg (18,475 lb)
- Powerplant: 4 × Gnome-Rhône 14M Mars 2-row 14-cylinder supercharged radials , 507 kW (680 hp) each

Performance

- Maximum speed: 470 km/h (292 mph, 254 kn)
- Cruise speed: 400 km/h (249 mph, 216 kn)
- Range: 1,000 km (622 mi, 541 nmi)
