= Potez 31 =

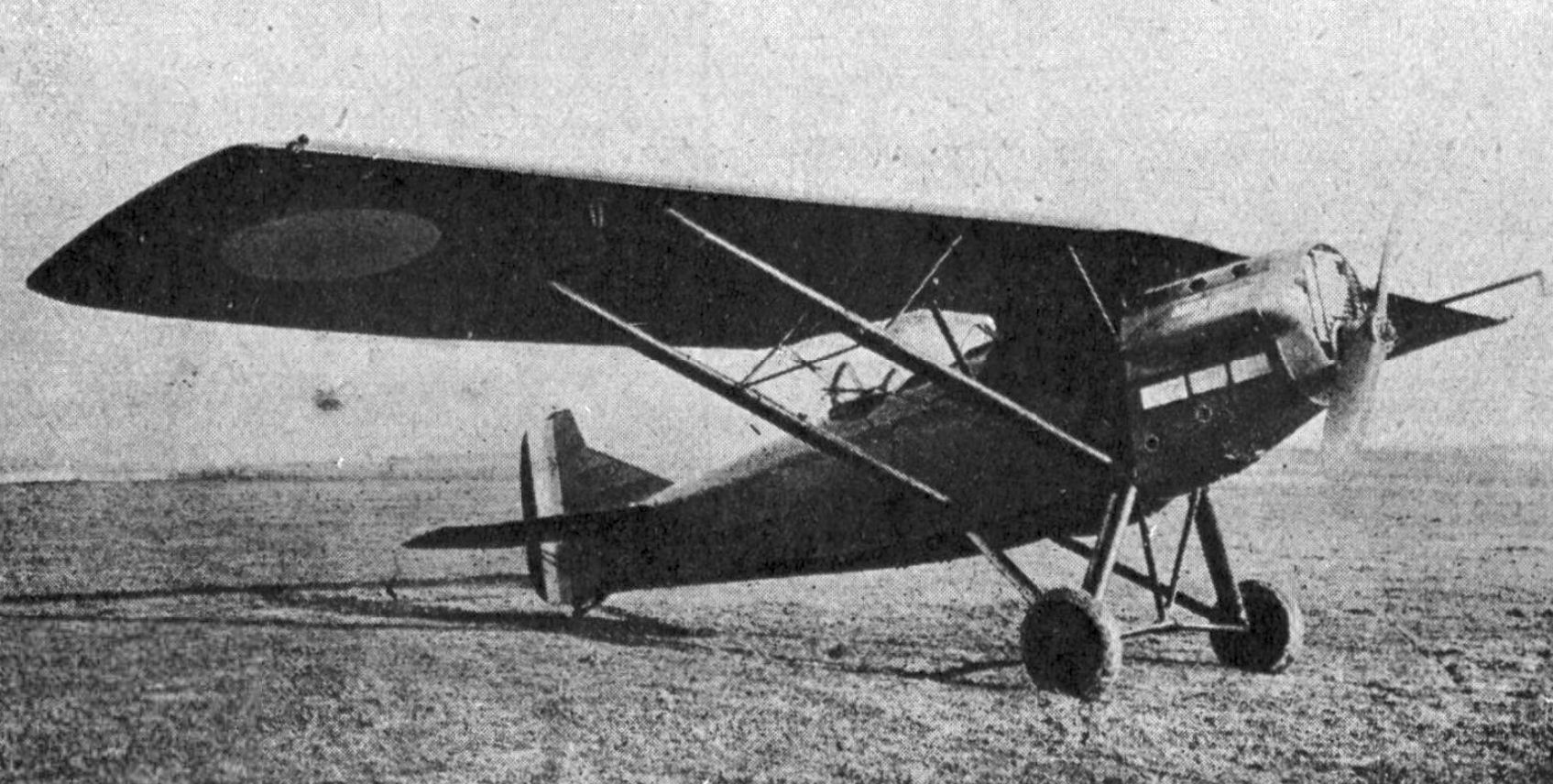

General information
- Type: Fighter aircraft
- National origin: France
- Manufacturer: Societe des Avions Henri Potez
- Number built: 1

History
- First flight: c.1928
- Developed from: Potez 25.36

The Potez 31 was a prototype French two-seat night fighter, flown in about 1928, intended to fill the Cn.2 specification for the Armee de l'Air. Only one was built.

== Design and development ==
The Potez 31 was a parasol-wing monoplane derived from the monoplane Potez 25.36 variant. Its wing, with no dihedral, a leading edge swept at 6° and a low aspect ratio of about 5 was built around two spars and fabric covered. The outer panels were of almost constant chord apart from a slight decrease in sweep on their outer trailing edges. The tips were straight, angled and slightly blunted. These panels were braced by a pair of parallel struts from the lower fuselage longeron on each side. Close to the fuselage the trailing edge curved forward to join a narrow chord centre section, improving the field of view from the cockpits. This section was supported over the fuselage by four inclined cabane struts from the upper fuselage longerons. Long-span ailerons were controlled via spades.

Four spruce longerons formed the basis of the fuselage, which was plywood-covered forward from the cockpit area. The gunner's position, with a rotatable machine gun mounting, was close behind the smaller cockpit for the pilot. Both were equipped with heating and oxygen. Aft of the gunner the fuselage was fabric-covered apart from curved plywood decking. A clipped triangular tailplane mounted on the upper longerons carried near rectangular, horn-balanced elevators. The fin was straight-edged and the rudder also horn-balanced.

The Potez 31 was powered by a 370 kW (500 hp) Hispano-Suiza 12G, a W-12 engine, driving a two-blade propeller. A partially retractable honeycomb radiator was mounted under the fuselage at the rear of the engine and fuel tanks were in the fuselage over the centre of gravity. It had a tail wheel undercarriage with main wheels on a split axle, centrally supported by a lateral V-strut from the fuselage lower longerons at the base of the forward wing struts. The outer ends were hinged on longitudinally mounted V-struts, the forward member rubber sprung, from the lower fuselage longerons at the bases of the two wing struts.

Neither L'Aerophile nor L'Ailes, two contemporary French aviation periodicals, record the date of the Potez 31's first flight or any subsequent history. Modern sources vary widely on the first flight, ranging at least from 27 December 1927 to 1929. The French newspaper Le Petit Parisien records that on 25 September 1929 the aircraft, flown by Marmier and Favreau, took off loaded with 4,870 L (1,071 imp gal; 1,287 US gal) of fuel on the first stage of a straight-line flight record attempt to Madagascar, although the attempt was abandoned due to poor weather.

== Engine variations ==
Data from: The sole Potex 31 was flown with the following engines:

- Hispano-Suiza 12Mb (V-12)
- Hispano-Suiza 12Ga (W-12)
- Hispano-Suiza 12Hb (V-12)
- Lorraine-Dietrich 12Fb (W-12)

== Specifications ==
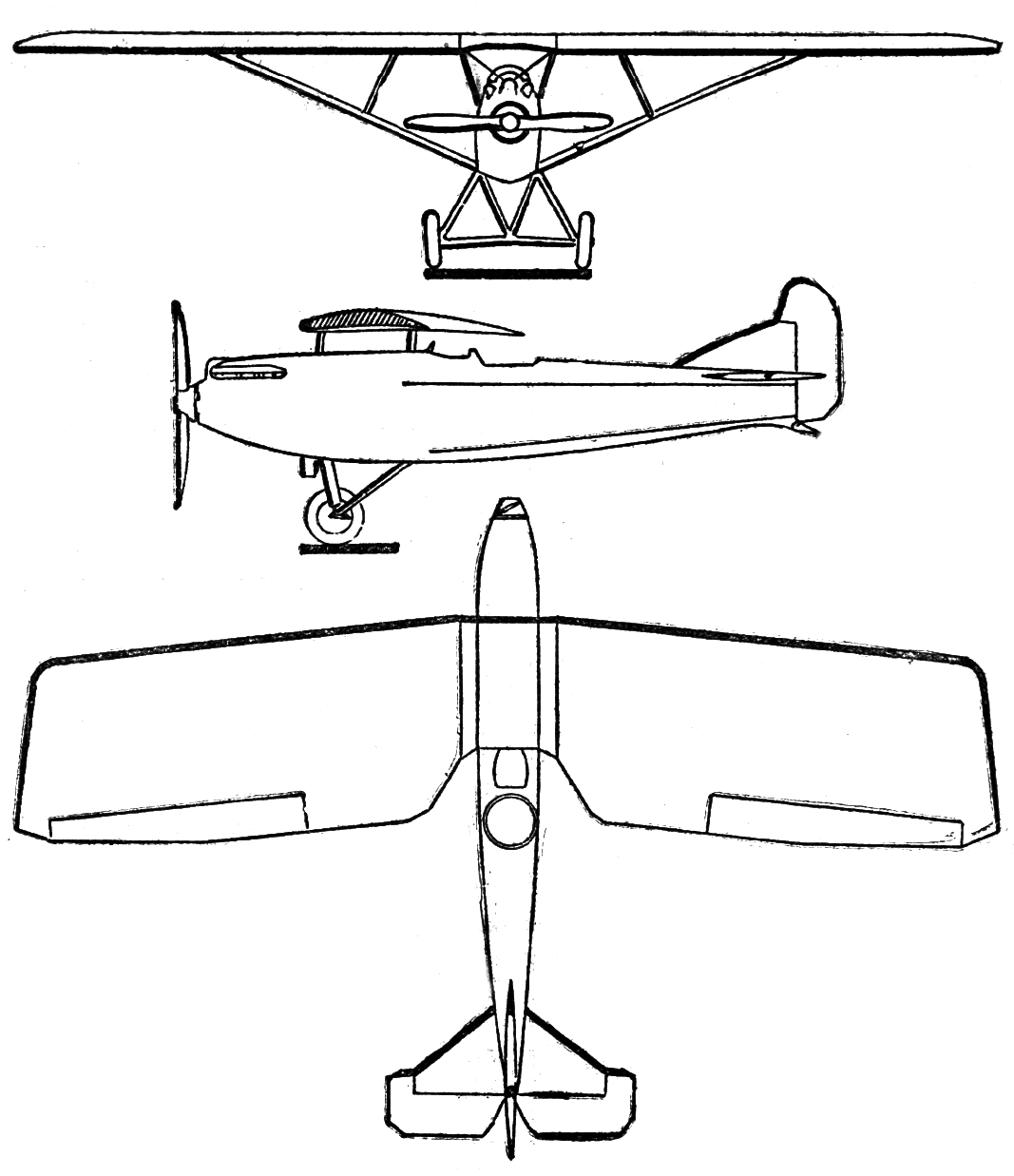
Potez 31 3-view drawing from Les Ailes September 6,1928

Data from Les Ailes 6 September 1928 Performance figures are calculated.

General characteristics

- Crew: Two
- Length: 9.50 m (31 ft 2 in)
- Wingspan: 14.30 m (46 ft 11 in)
- Height: 2.90 m (9 ft 6 in)
- Wing area: 40 m^{2} (430 sq ft)
- Empty weight: 1,270 kg (2,800 lb)
- Gross weight: 2,130 kg (4,696 lb)
- Powerplant: 1 × Hispano-Suiza 12G W-12 engine, 370 kW (500 hp)
- Propellers: 2-bladed

Performance

- Maximum speed: 250 km/h (160 mph, 130 kn) at sea level
- Service ceiling: 8,000 m (26,000 ft)
