= Potez XI =

Fighter aircraft

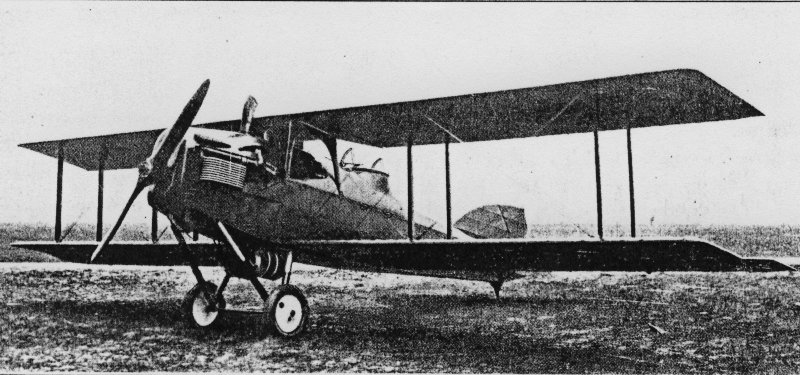

General information
- Type: Fighter aircraft
- National origin: France
- Manufacturer: Potez
- Number built: 1

History
- First flight: December 11, 1922

The Potez XI was the first fighter aircraft designed by the French company Potez. Designed in 1922, the only aircraft first flew on December 11 of that year, after which further development work stopped. It was built to meet CAP (chasse armée protection) 2 requirements created in 1919 by the new director of Aeronautics, General Duval. It was to perform bomber, intercept and tactical reconnaissance for the military, as well as escort fighters. The aircraft was to be powered by a turbo-supercharged engine.

== Specifications ==
Data from Flight International

General characteristics

- Crew: 2
- Length: 9.08 m (29 ft 9 in)
- Wingspan: 12.7 m (41 ft 8 in)
- Wing area: 46.2 m^{2} (497 sq ft)
- Empty weight: 1,350 kg (2,976 lb)
- Max takeoff weight: 2,000 kg (4,409 lb)
- Powerplant: 1 × Lorraine-Dietrich 12D , 280 kW (370 hp) with a Rateau turbo-charger

Performance

- Maximum speed: 220 km/h (140 mph, 120 kn) at 4,000 m (13,000 ft)
- Cruise speed: 186 km/h (116 mph, 100 kn)
- Service ceiling: 8,000 m (26,000 ft)

Armament

- 2× fixed forward firing 7.7 mm (0.303 in) machine guns
- 2x 7.7 mm (0.303 in) machine guns mounted on a manually aimed flexible mounting in the rear cockpit
