= Potez 36 =

French two-seat touring or sport monoplane

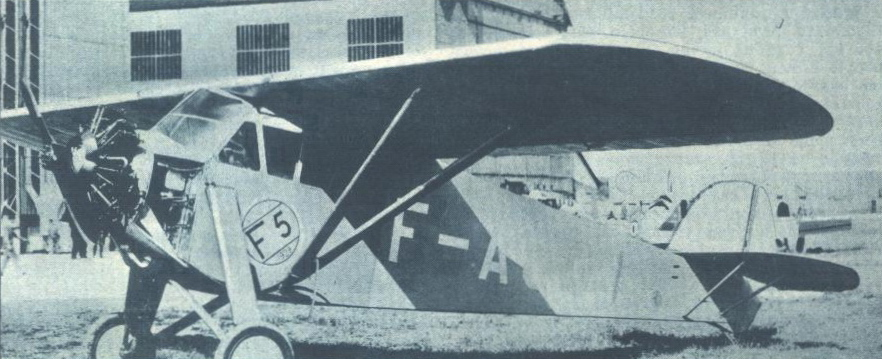
- "Challenge International de Tourisme", 1929

General information
- Type: Two-seat sport/touring monoplane
- National origin: France
- Manufacturer: Potez
- Number built: 300+

History
- First flight: 1929
- Variants: Potez 43 & Potez 58

The Potez 36 was a French two-seat touring or sport monoplane designed and built by Potez.

== Design and development ==
The Potez 36 was a high-wing braced monoplane with a conventional landing gear. It had an enclosed cabin with side-by-side seating for a pilot and passenger. The design had some unusual features like folding wings to make it easier to store or to tow behind a motor car. Some of the aircraft had Potez-designed leading-edge slats. The aircraft was popular with both French private owners and flying clubs with a small number being used by the French Air Force during the 1930s as liaison aircraft.

== Variants ==
Potez 36
Prototype of the series powered by a 45 kW (60 hp) Salmson 5Ac radial engine.
Potez36/1
production version powered by a 52 kW (70 hp) Renault 4Pa; two built.
Potez 36/3
Prototype followed by six production aircraft with no slats, powered by a 45 kW (60 hp) Salmson 5Ac radial engine.
Potez 36/5
Variant with no slats but powered by a 71 kW (95 hp) Salmson 7Ac engine; five built.
Potez 36/13
Production version of the 36/5 but fitted with leading-edge slats, 96 built.

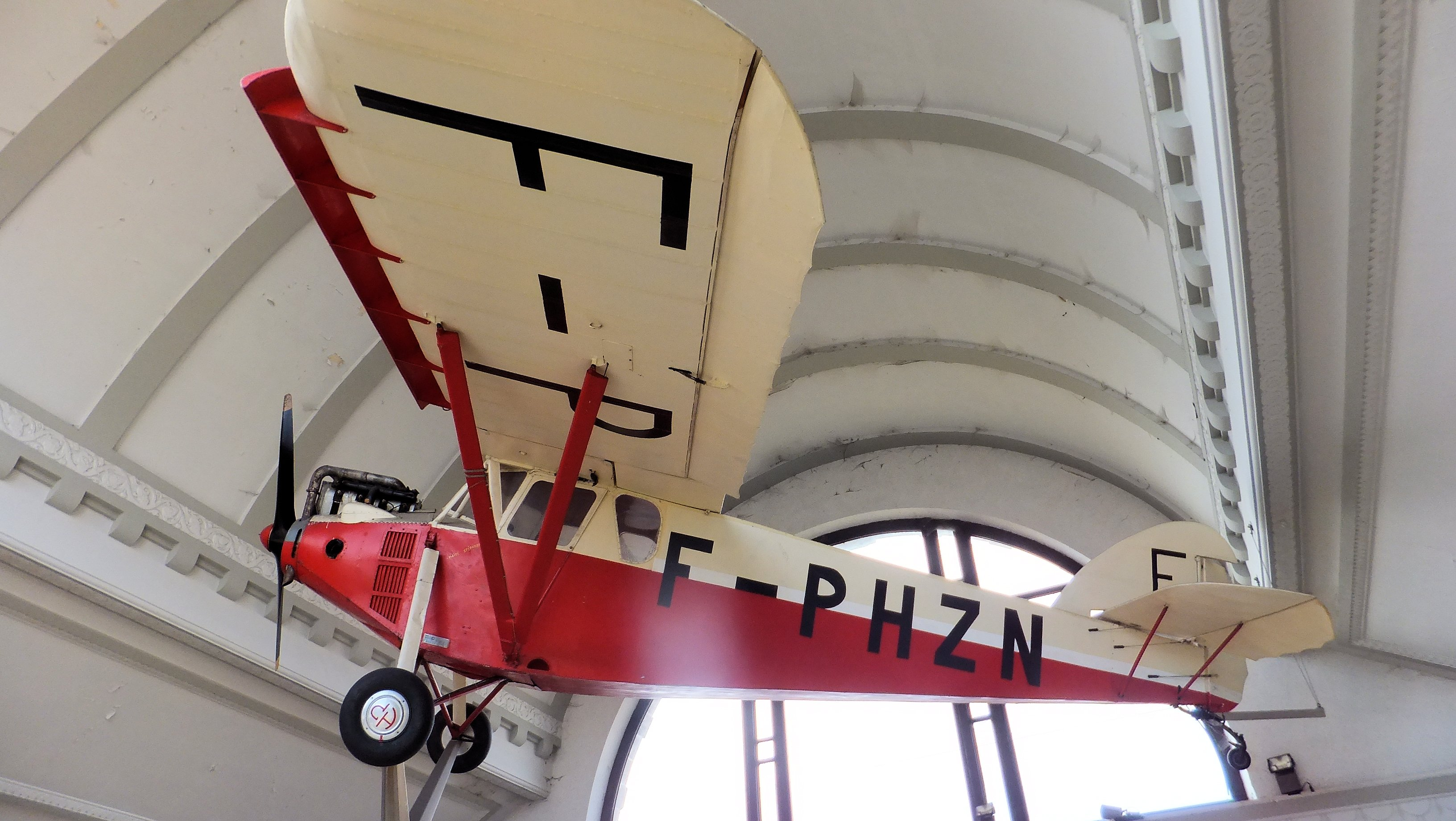
Potez 36/14 Renault 95 hp. - gare d'Albert, Somme

Potez 36/14
Variant with a 71 kW (95 hp) Renault 4Pb engine and leading-edge slats and wheel brakes, 103 built.
Potez 36/15
Variant with a 75 kW (100 hp) Potez 6Ab engine, 18 built.
Potez 36/17
Variant with a 78 kW (104 hp) Cirrus Hermes IIB engine, two built.
Potez 36/19
Variant with a 75 kW (100 hp) Renault 4Pci engine, two built.
Potez 36/21
Production variant with a 75 kW (100 hp) Potez 6Ac engine and wheels with balloon tyres, 29 built.

== Specifications (Potez 36/3) ==
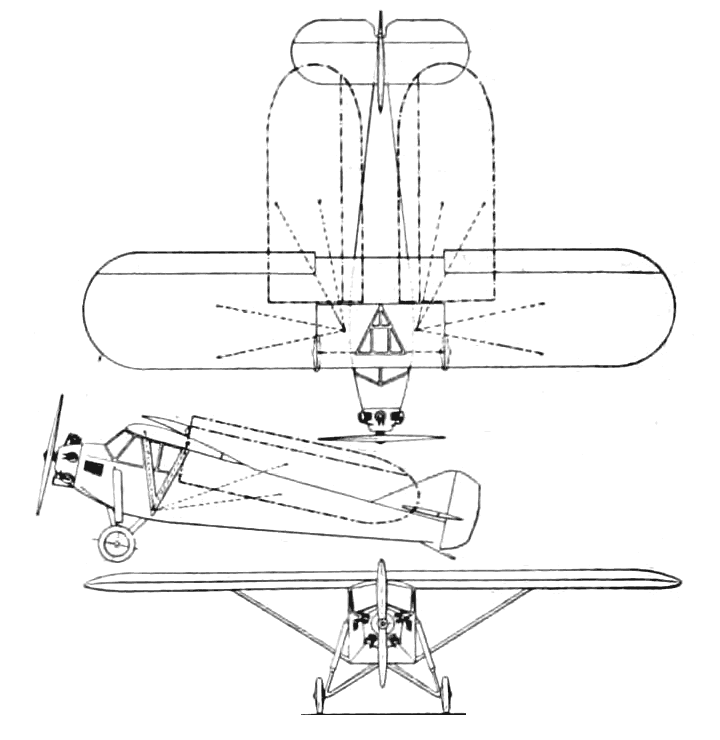
Potez 36 3-view drawing from Aero Digest December 1929

Data from The Illustrated Encyclopedia of Aircraft

General characteristics

- Crew: 1 (pilot)
- Capacity: 1 (passenger)
- Length: 7.50 m (24 ft 7 in)
- Wingspan: 10.45 m (34 ft 3 in)
- Width: 4.00 m (13 ft 1 in) (wings folded)
- Height: 2.45 m (8 ft 0 in)
- Wing area: 20.00 m^{2} (215.3 sq ft)
- Empty weight: 427 kg (941 lb)
- Gross weight: 650 kg (1,433 lb)
- Powerplant: 1 × Salmson 5Ac 5-cylinder radial piston engine, 45 kW (60 hp)

Performance

- Maximum speed: 150 km/h (93 mph, 81 kn)
- Cruise speed: 120 km/h (75 mph, 65 kn)
- Range: 500 km (310 mi, 270 nmi)
- Service ceiling: 3,600 m (11,800 ft)
