= Potez 62 =

1930s French airliner

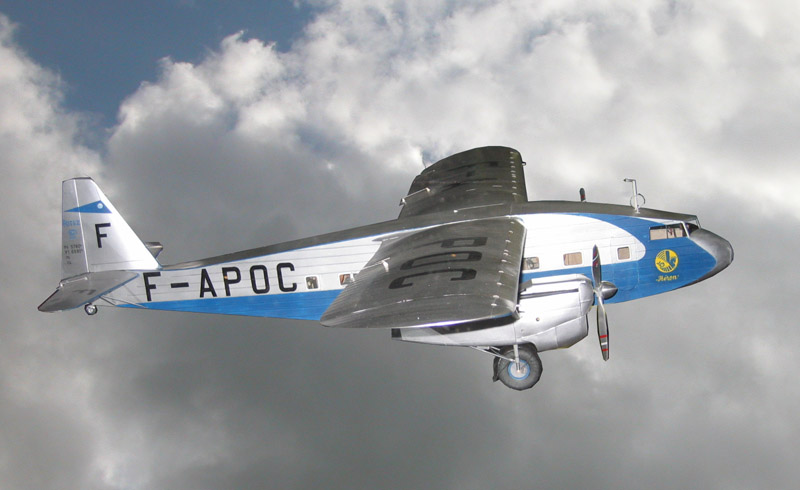

General information
- Type: Civil airliner
- National origin: France
- Manufacturer: Potez
- Designer: Henry Potez

History
- First flight: 28 January 1935
- Developed from: Potez 54
- Variants: Potez 650

The Potez 62 was a French twin-engine civil airliner, designed by Henry Potez in 1934. The French military adapted this airframe two-years later to create the Potez 650.

== History ==
The Potez 62 has its origins in the Potez 54, a military bomber.

On 28 January 1935, the prototype of the Potez 62 made its maiden flight.

The aircraft was a high-wing monoplane. Its a wooden fuselage had a composite coating, whereas the wings were covered with fabric and the leading edge was made out of metal. The aircraft was propelled by two Gnôme & Rhône 14 cylinder radial engines, which could produce roughly 870 hp. The engines were mounted in two side cradles, fixed to the fuselage and to the wings.

The cabin was divided into two compartments and could accommodate 14 to 16 people. A version equipped with Hispano-Suiza V-engines was ordered by Air France in 1936. These were used on routes inside South America. By late 1936, many Potez 62s were employed on routes to Europe and the Far East, as the aircraft was robust and reliable, albeit slow. It remained in service until the Second World War, and one was used by the Free French Air Force.

== Variants ==
Potez 620
Twin-engined civil airliner, powered by 1x 870 horsepower (650 kW) Gnome-Rhône 14Kirs Mistral Major + 1x 870 horsepower (650 kW) Gnome-Rhône 14Kjrs Mistral Major radial engines (LH & RH rotation). Also designated Potez 62-0.
Potez 621
Improved version of the Potez 62, powered by 1x 720 horsepower (540 kW) Hispano-Suiza 12Xirs + 1x 720 horsepower (540 kW) Hispano-Suiza 12Xijrs liquid-cooled V12 engines (LH & RH rotation). Also designated Potez 62-1.

== Operators ==
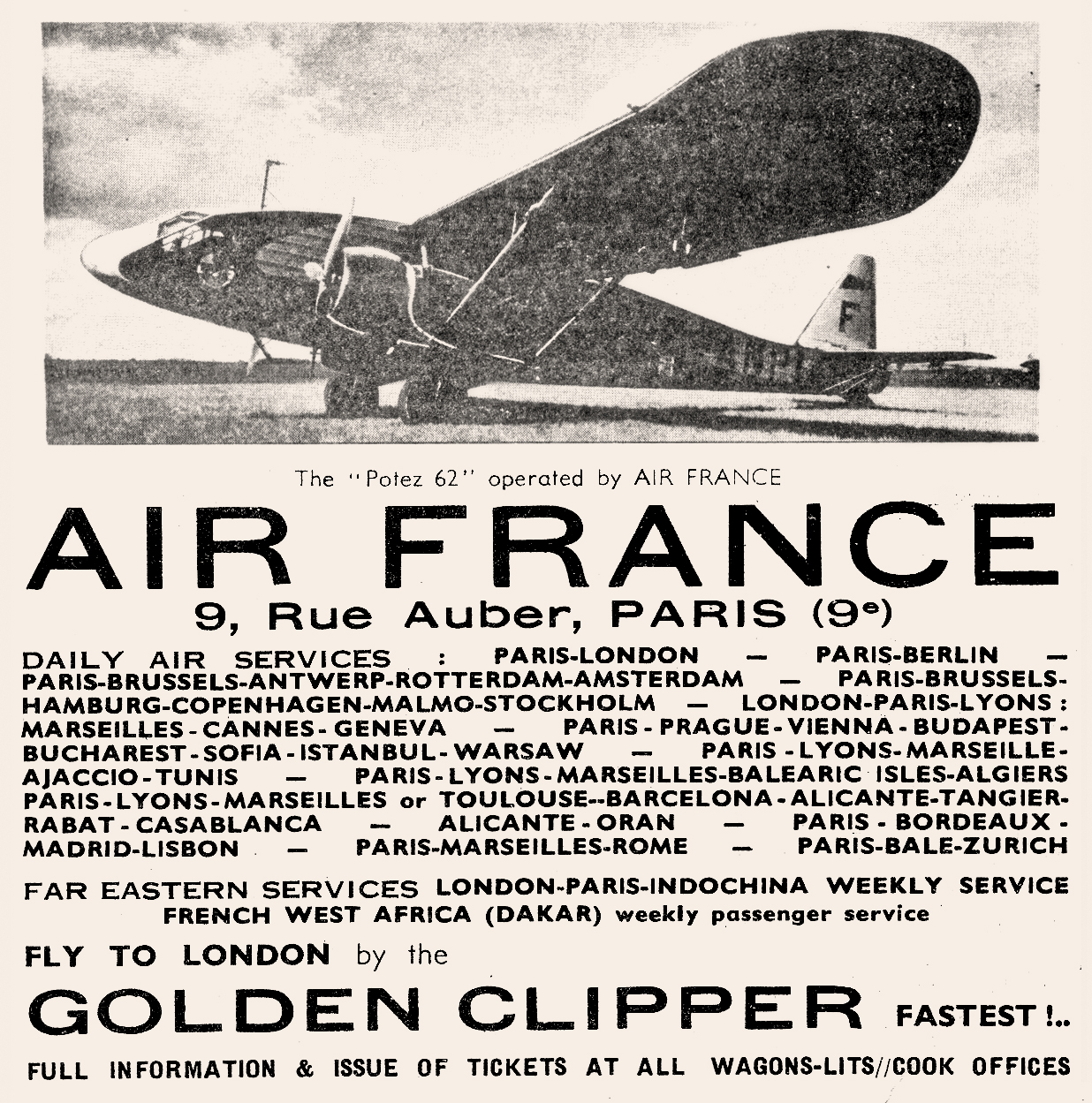
1936 Air France ad for service with Potez 62

France

- Air France
- Free French Air Force

Romania

- LARES

Uruguay

- Pluna

== Specifications (Potez 620) ==
Data from Aviafrance : Potez 620World Encyclopedia of Civil Aircraft

General characteristics

- Crew: three
- Capacity: 14-16 passengers
- Length: 17.32 m (56 ft 10 in)
- Wingspan: 22.45 m (73 ft 8 in)
- Height: 3.9 m (12 ft 10 in)
- Wing area: 76.1 m^{2} (819 sq ft)
- Empty weight: 4,000 kg (8,818 lb)
- Gross weight: 7,500 kg (16,535 lb)
- Powerplant: 1 × Gnome-Rhône 14Kirs Mistral Major 14-cylinder air-cooled radial piston engine, 610 kW (820 hp) LH rotation fitted to starboard
- Powerplant: 1 × Gnome-Rhône 14Kjrs Mistral Major 14-cylinder air-cooled radial piston engine, 610 kW (820 hp) RH rotation fitted to port
- Propellers: 3-bladed variable-pitch metal propeller

Performance

- Maximum speed: 325 km/h (202 mph, 175 kn)
- Cruise speed: 280 km/h (170 mph, 150 kn) at 2,000 m (6,600 ft)
- Range: 1,000 km (620 mi, 540 nmi)
- Service ceiling: 7,400 m (24,300 ft)

== See also ==
- List of aircraft of World War II
- List of aircraft of the French Air Force during World War II
