= Potez 60 =

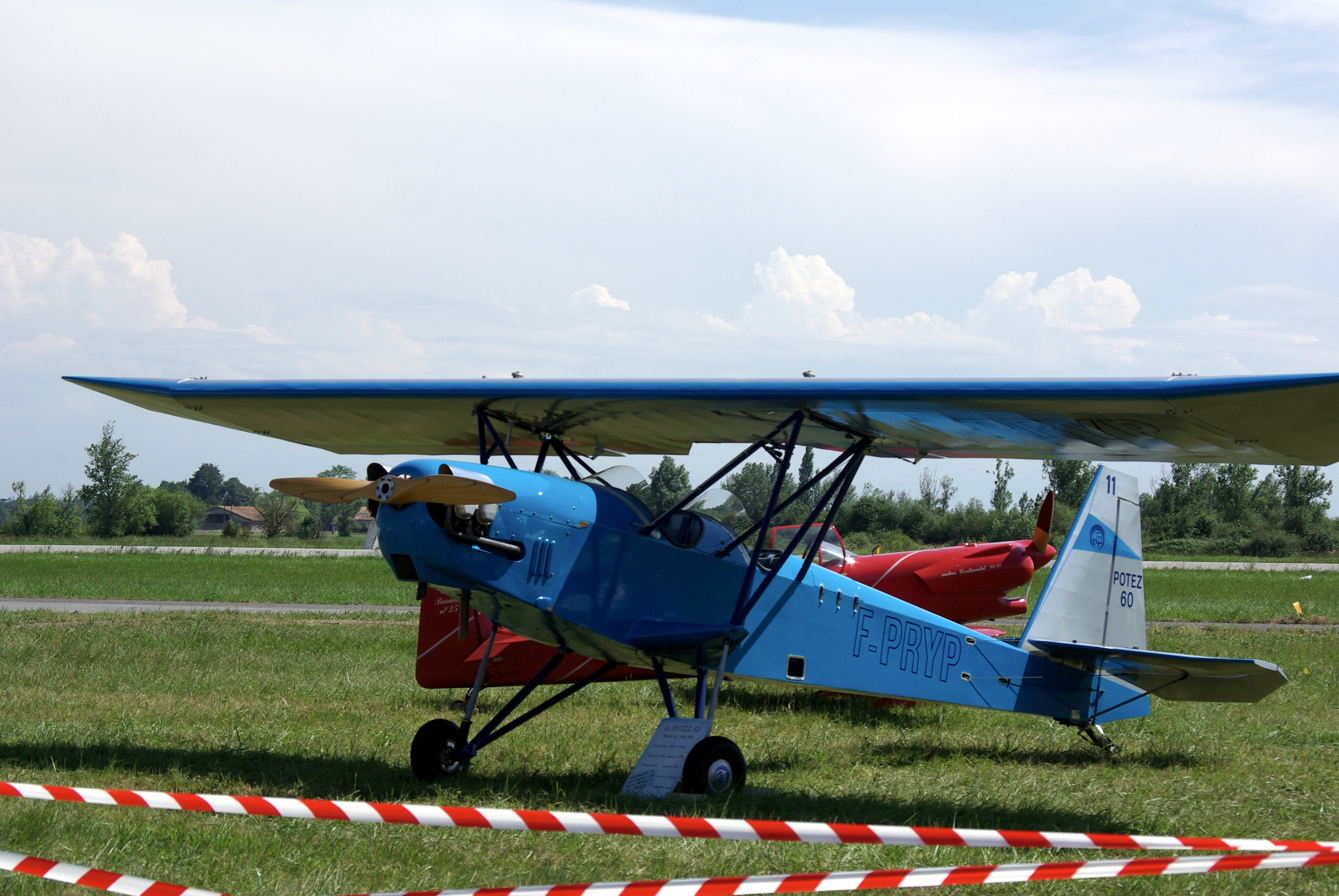

General information
- Type: Monoplane trainer
- National origin: France
- Manufacturer: Potez
- Number built: 155

History
- First flight: 1935

The Potez 60 sometimes named the Sauterelle ("Grasshopper") is a French 1930s parasol-wing open-cockpit trainer. It had a wide-track tailwheel landing gear and is powered by a 45 kW (60 hp) Potez 3B uncowled radial engine. An order for 250 was placed by the French government, but deliveries stopped after 155 aircraft were produced.

== Specifications ==
General characteristics

- Crew: 2
- Wingspan: 10 m (32 ft 9.75 in)
- Powerplant: 1 × Potez 3B radial engine , 45 kW (60 hp)

Performance

- Maximum speed: 145 km/h (90 mph, 78 kn)
