= Potez 29 =

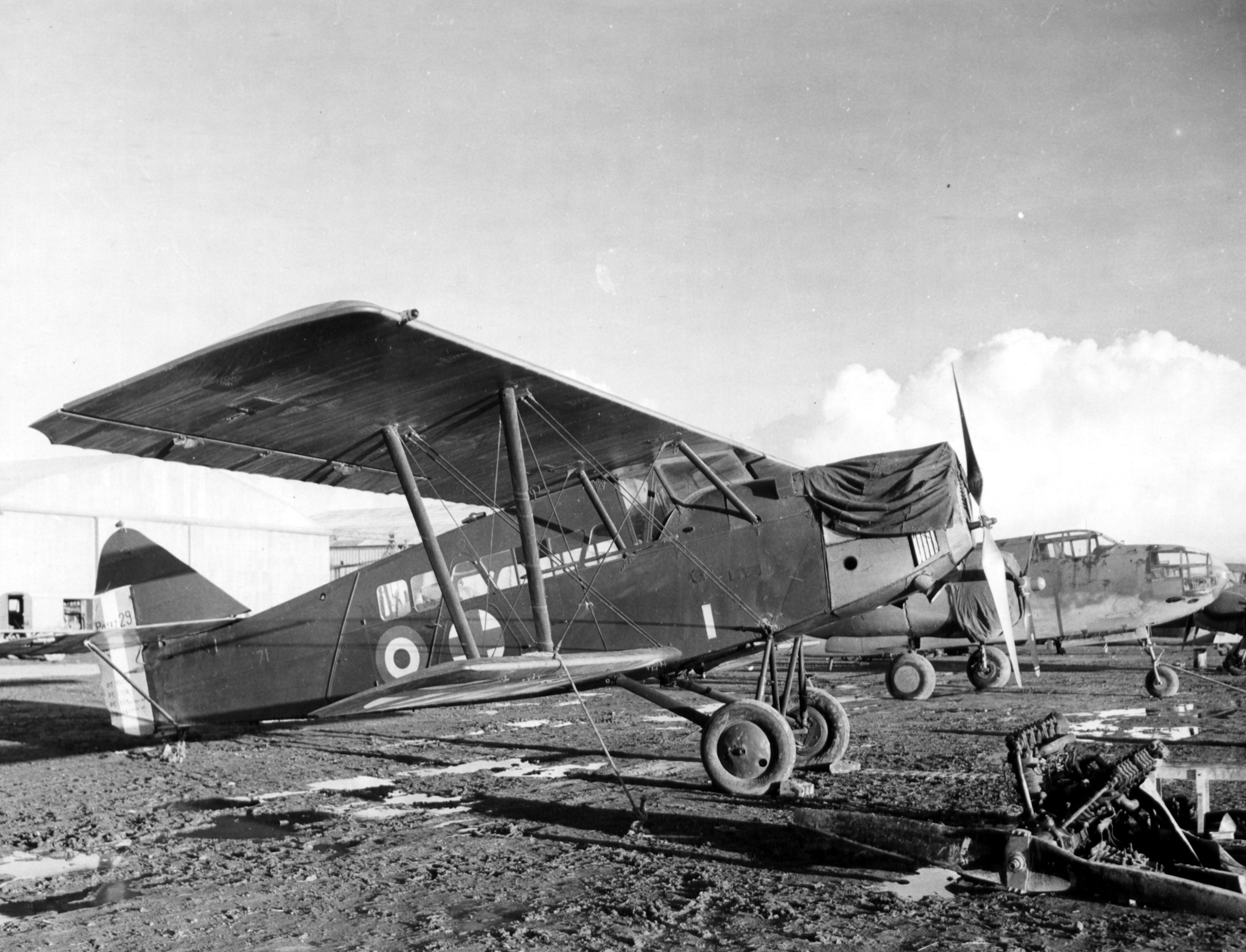
- Potez 29 in North Africa, January 1943

General information
- Type: Transport biplane
- National origin: France
- Manufacturer: Potez
- Primary user: French Air Force
- Number built: 146

History
- First flight: 1927

The Potez 29 was a 1920s French passenger biplane designed and built by Avions Henry Potez. Although designed as a civilian aircraft, a large number entered service with the French Air Force.

== Development ==
The Potez 29 was a biplane powered by a nose-mounted 335 kW (450 hp) Lorraine 12Eb broad-arrow piston engine, with a fixed tailskid landing gear. Based on the earlier Potez 25, with the same wings and engine, the Potez 29 had a new fuselage with an enclosed cockpit for two crew and a cabin for five passengers. The 29 proved to be a success; it entered service with civilian airlines, and 120 were delivered to the French Air Force, mainly as an air ambulance and light transport.

== Variants ==
Potez 29
Prototype and six production aircraft with a Lorraine 12Eb engine.
Potez 29/2
Production variant for the French Air Force with a Lorraine 12Eb engine, 123 built.
Potez 29/4
Civil variant with a 359 kW (480 hp) Gnome-Rhône 9Ady Jupiter radial engine, 15 built.

== Operators ==
=== Civil operators ===
- CIDNA
- LARES
- Aeroput

=== Military operators ===
- French Air Force
- Free French Air Force
- Royal Air Force

== Specifications (Potez 29) ==
General characteristics

- Crew: 2
- Capacity: 5
- Length: 10.68 m (35 ft 0 in)
- Mid wingspan: 14.5 m (47 ft 7 in)
- Height: 3.67 m (12 ft 0 in)
- Gross weight: 2,650 kg (5,842 lb)
- Powerplant: 1 × Lorraine 12Eb W-12 liquid-cooled piston engine, 360 kW (480 hp)

Performance

- Maximum speed: 219 km/h (136 mph, 118 kn)
- Cruise speed: 185 km/h (115 mph, 100 kn)
- Range: 500 km (310 mi, 270 nmi)
- Service ceiling: 4,500 m (14,800 ft)

== See also ==
Related lists

- List of Interwar military aircraft
- List of aircraft of World War II
- List of aircraft of the French Air Force during World War II
