= Gnome-Rhône 14M =

1930s French piston aircraft engine

Gnome-Rhône 14M Mars
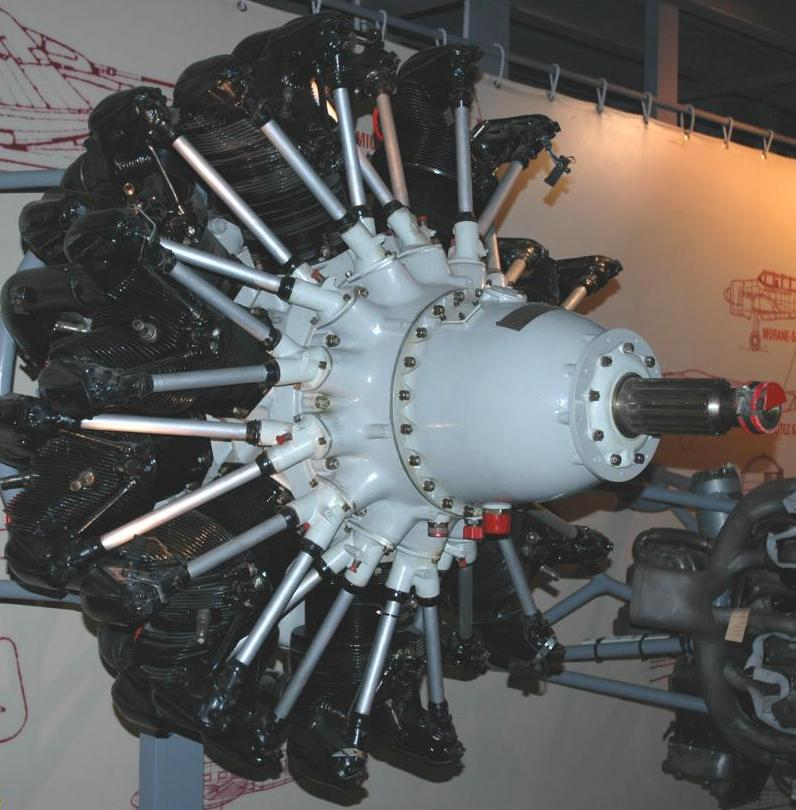
- A preserved Gnome-Rhône 14M-05 Mars
- Type: Radial engine
- National origin: France
- Manufacturer: Gnome et Rhône
- First run: 1936
- Developed from: Gnome-Rhône 14N

The Gnome-Rhône 14M was a small 14-cylinder two-row air-cooled radial engine that was used on several French and German aircraft of World War II. While having the same appearance, number of pistons (14) and two-row layout typical of Gnome-Rhône radial engines, the 14M was built to a smaller frame intended to power a lighter class of aircraft. It was designed with lower displacement and power, smaller in size and with less weight compared to the larger, heavier Gnome-Rhône 14N and its well-known predecessor.

== Variants ==
14M-00
LH rotation, 474 kW (635 hp)
14M-01
RH rotation identical to 14M-00
14M-04
LH rotation, 521.99 kW (700 hp)
14M-05
RH rotation identical to 14M-04
14M-06
LH rotation, 521.99 kW (700 hp), reduction gear 0.71:1
14M-07
RH rotation identical to 14M-06
14M-08
LH rotation, 559.27 kW (750 hp), reduction gear 0.71:1
14M-09
RH rotation identical to 14M-08

== Applications ==
- Breguet 693
- Bloch MB.700
- Gotha Go 244
- Henschel Hs 129B
- Focke-Wulf Fw 189E
- LWS-3 Mewa
- Lioré et Olivier LeO 20
- Morane-Saulnier Vanneau
- Potez 220
- Potez 630
- Potez 631
- Potez 633
- Potez 637
- Potez 63.11
- Potez 662
- Roussel R-30
- SNCAO CAO.600
- SNCASE SE-400
- SNCAC NC.510M
- SNCAC NC.530
- SNCAC NC.600

== Specifications (14M-4) ==
(14M-5 identical except opposite rotation)

Data from

=== General characteristics ===
- Type: Fourteen-cylinder two-row supercharged air-cooled radial engine
- Bore: 122 mm (4.80 in)
- Stroke: 116 mm (4.57 in)
- Displacement: 18.92 L (1,154.6 cu in)
- Length: 1,251 mm (49.25 in)
- Diameter: 950 mm (37.40 in)
- Dry weight: 419 kg (924 lb)

=== Components ===
- Valvetrain: Two overhead valves per cylinder
- Supercharger: gear driven, 8.258:1 ratio, 1-speed supercharger
- Fuel system: Bronzavia 110-L2 carburetor with automatic boost and altitude control
- Fuel type: 87 octane rating gasoline
- Oil system: Pressure feed 482.6 kPa (70 psi), dry sump, 120 S.U. secs (25.1 cSt) grade oil.
- Cooling system: Air-cooled
- Reduction gear: 0.71:1
- Air Equipment 47 electric inertia starter

=== Performance ===
- Power output:
- (Take-off): 521.99 kW (700 hp) at 3,030 rpm for takeoff with 1,100 mm (43.3 in) Hg / +3 kg (6.6 lb) boost
- (Normal): 492.16 kW (660 hp) at 3,030 rpm at 4,000 m (13,123 ft)
- (cruising): 339.29 kW (455 hp) at 2,350 rpm at 4,000 m (13,123 ft)
- Specific power: 27.21 kW/L (0.61 hp/(cu in))
- Compression ratio: 6.5:1
- Specific fuel consumption: 0.29 kg/(kW h) (0.48 lb/(hp h))
- Oil consumption: 0.01 kg/(kW h) (0.018 lb/(hp h))
- Power-to-weight ratio: 1.27 kW/kg (0.77 hp/lb)
  - B.m.e.p. max: 1,075 kPa (155.9 psi)

== See also ==
- Alvis Leonides
- Pratt & Whitney R-1535 a comparable engine sometimes fitted as an alternative to the 14M on French designs
