= Potez =

Former French aircraft manufacturer

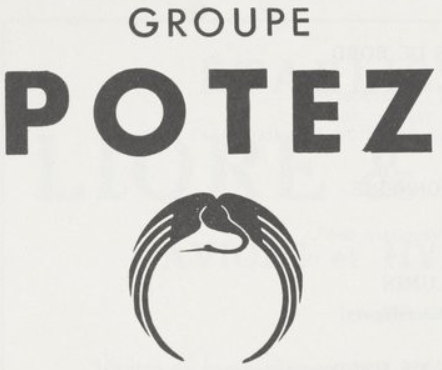
- Industry: Aerospace industry
- Founded: 1919
- Founder: Henry Potez
- Defunct: 1967
- Successor: Sud Aviation
- Headquarters: Aubervilliers, France
- Products: Aircraft, aircraft engines

Potez (pronounced [pɔtɛz]) was a French aircraft manufacturer founded as Aéroplanes Henry Potez by Henry Potez at Aubervilliers in 1919. The firm began by refurbishing war-surplus SEA IV aircraft, but was soon building new examples of an improved version, the Potez SEA VII.

== History ==
During the inter-war years, Potez built a range of small passenger aircraft and a series of military reconnaissance biplanes that were also licence-built in Poland. In 1933, the firm bought flying boat manufacturer CAMS.

The company was nationalized in 1936, following which it was merged with Chantiers aéronavals Étienne Romano, Lioré et Olivier, CAMS and SPCA in order to form the Société nationale des constructions aéronautiques du Sud-Est (SNCASE) on 1 February 1937.

Potez's factories in Sartrouville and Méaulte were taken over by SNCAN and the Berre factory went to SNCASE.

After World War II, Potez was re-established as Société des Avions et Moteurs Henry Potez at Argenteuil but did not return to the prominence that the company enjoyed prior to nationalisation. In 1958, the company bought Fouga to form Potez Air-Fouga, but when Potez's last design, the 840 (a small turboprop airliner) failed to attract customers, it was forced to close. The remaining assets were purchased by Sud-Aviation in 1967.

== Aircraft ==
- Potez VII
- Potez VIII
- Potez IX
- Potez X
- Potez XI
- Potez XV
- Potez XVII
- Potez 23
- Potez 25
- Potez 27
- Potez 28
- Potez 29
- Potez 31
- Potez 32
- Potez 33
- Potez 36
- Potez 37
- Potez 38
- Potez 39
- Potez 42
- Potez 43
- Potez 50
- Potez 53
- Potez 54
- Potez 56
- Potez 58
- Potez 60
- Potez 62
- Potez 63
- Potez 65
- Potez 75
- Potez 91
- Potez 220
- Potez 230
- Potez 452
- Potez 540
- Potez 630
- Potez 650
- Potez 661
- Potez 662
- Potez 840
- Potez-CAMS 140 project only
- Potez-CAMS 141
- Potez-CAMS 142 project only
- Potez-CAMS 160
- Potez-CAMS 161
- Potez SEA VII

== Engines ==
- Potez A-4 (1920s)
- Potez 4D
- Potez 4E
- Potez 6D
- Potez 8D
- Potez 12D
- Potez 9A
- Potez 9B (9 cylinder radial)

== See also ==
- List of aircraft manufacturers
- List of aircraft engine manufacturers
