= Rigid inflatable boat =

Boat with rigid hull and inflatable tubes

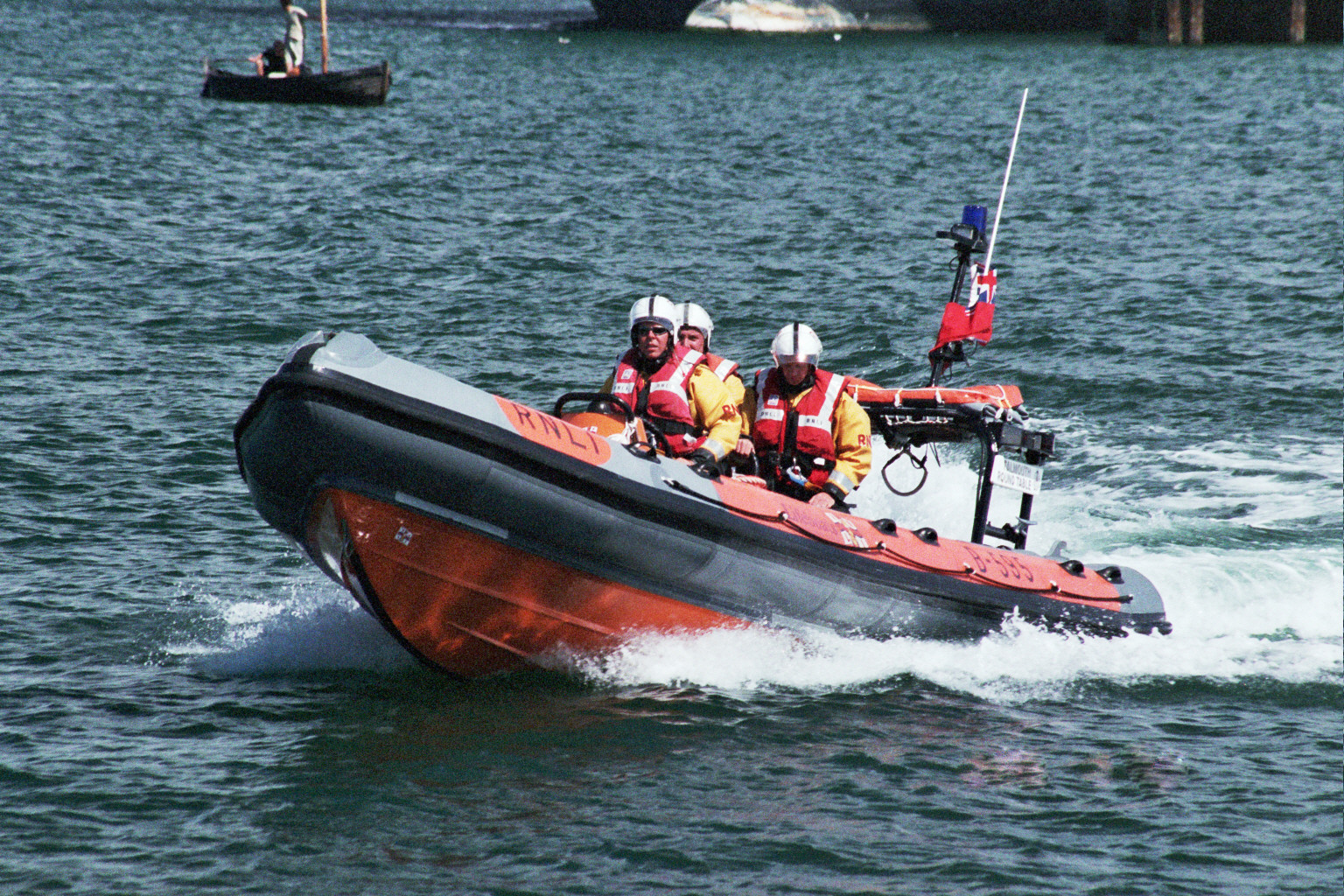
RNLI inshore rescue boat during Falmouth Lifeboat Day, August 2006

A rigid inflatable boat (RIB), also rigid-hull inflatable boat or rigid-hulled inflatable boat (RHIB), is a lightweight but high-performance and high-capacity boat constructed with a rigid hull bottom joined to side-forming air tubes that are inflated with air to high pressure to give the sides resilient rigidity along the boat's topsides. The design is stable, light, fast and seaworthy. The inflated collar ensures that the vessel retains its buoyancy, even if the boat is taking on water. The RIB is an evolutionary development of the inflatable boat with a rubberized fabric bottom that is stiffened with flat boards within the collar to form the deck or floor of the boat.

== History ==
=== Origins in Wales ===
The concept of configuring a rigid hull surrounded by an inflated, compartmentalized buoyancy tube from prow to transom originated and evolved from the problems that plagued existing rubberized fabric bottom inflated motorboats: fabric wear-through and poor sea keeping due to lack of immersed hull structural rigidity. A solution was sought starting at Atlantic College, the first of now 18 United World Colleges, which had opened on the southern coast of Wales in 1962, founded partly by Kurt Hahn, the German educator who had earlier originated Outward Bound in Aberdovey Scotland during the Second World War for instilling ‘resilience’ and moral fortitude in youth.

Development of the RIB was originally undertaken by students and staff under the direction of retired Royal Navy Admiral Desmond Hoare, who headed the 6th form (senior secondary) college.

Early RIBs and other rescue boats at the Atlantic College Lifeboat Station in 1966, with the college in the background.

A series of experimental and prototype solutions for effectively combining a hard hull form with a pressurized, air-filled rubber infused nylon fabric (Hypalon) sponson lasted for over a decade. The RHIB craft developed at Atlantic College served as an effective seafront activities safety and rescue boat for the college's fleet of sailing dinghies on the often challenging Bristol Channel, and the college went on to become an Inshore Lifeboat Station for the RNLI in 1963, carrying out countless rescues over the next 50 years.

The Royal National Lifeboat Institution had been operating entirely inflated small motorized boats for close to shore rescue recovery that were nautically limited in their capacity, range, endurance, sea keeping, sea worthiness and top speed.

The RNLI's "B-Class Atlantic Inshore Lifeboat" (including the Atlantic 21, the Atlantic 75, and Atlantic 85) was named in honor of the college's role in its development. The Atlantic College Lifeboat Station was decommissioned by the RNLI in 2013. The video RIB History at UWC Atlantic College provides a visual historical summary.

In 1964, Rear-Admiral Hoare and his students at Atlantic College replaced the torn bottom of their 12 ft (3.7 m) sailing activity rescue inflatable boat with a plywood sheet glued to the inflatable tubes. This proved a successful modification but was rather uncomfortable at speed offshore, and so the hull was rebuilt with a shallow-vee bow entry transitioning to a nearly flat section stern. This boat was named Atlanta and later that year an Atlantic College RIB was displayed at the London Boat Show.

By 1966 the students had built a further five rigid inflatable boats – the 15 ft (4.6 m) Aphrodite and 16 ft (4.9 m) Triton for the college's own use, and the 16 ft (4.9 m) X1 and 22 ft (6.7 m) X2 which were made under a development agreement with the Royal National Lifeboat Institution (RNLI) and were launched in 1965 by Queen Elizabeth II. They were taken by the RNLI for trials at Gorleston (X1) and Great Yarmouth (X2) from which they returned to Atlantic College in Spring 1967. X3 was an experimental vortex-lift hull funded by a private developer and was not greatly successful.

By that time Hoare had concluded that for the conditions under which they operated a boat of around 18 ft (5.5 m) long was optimum which led to X4 (launched 1966), X5 and X6 (launched 1967), and X7 to X8 (launched 1968). These boats were used to support the college's sailing activities and also to fulfil the college's responsibility as an inshore lifeboat station for the RNLI – a responsibility it discharged up until 2013. At the same time, work started on a smaller series of beach-launchable boats, 10 ft (3.0 m)–12 ft (3.7 m) ft long, designated MX1–MX6) to support lifeguards on local beaches.

All the above boats’ hulls were built from plywood. In summer 1968, student Paul Jefferies designed and constructed a hull (X10) from fiberglass, which was not a success due to lack of strength. However, that development led to the building of Psychedelic Surfer, a twin-engined 21 ft (6.4 m) RIB, built in three weeks by two college students (Willem de Vogel and Otto van Voorst, assisted by Roy Thomson, college carpenter) for John Caulcutt, Graeme Dillon and Simon de’Ath to race in the 1969 Round Britain Powerboat Race, in which it finished 19th (out of 65 starters) and became the darling of the fleet.

From that time, the RNLI transferred development to its research centre in Cowes, who took the Atlantic College designs and developed from them the 21 ft (6.4 m) Atlantic 21 class of inshore lifeboats which entered service from 1970 through 2007. Atlantic 21-class lifeboat provides a class history of this vessel.

The first commercially saleable RIB was introduced in 1967 by Tony and Edward Lee-Elliott of Flatacraft, and patented by Admiral Desmond Hoare in 1969 after research and development at Atlantic College.

The first commercial RIB is believed to be the Avon Rubber Searider which was launched at the January 1969 London Boat Show.

The 108th Engineering Heritage Award by the Institution of Mechanical Engineers was presented to UWC Atlantic College on 30 July 2017 by Carolyn Griffiths, President of the IMeche, for its development of the X Alpha Rigid Inflatable Boat.

The definitive history of the development of the RHIB was written by David Sutcliffe, successor head of Atlantic College following Desmond Hoare’s retirement.

On Canada’s west coast Strait of Juan de Fuca near Race Rocks students of sister Pacific College along with Atlantic College sea rescue service grads in 1974 home built the first RHIB based on the Atlantic 21 surfing, open transom version in North America and the first inboard - outboard stern drive RHIB. These craft were loaned to the Pacific Region Cdn Coast Guard (Department of Transport) new inshore rescue boat service for trial and evaluation prior to CWLucas (now Zodiac) Hurricane fast hard hull inflatables being adopted by that service.

=== Introduction to North America ===
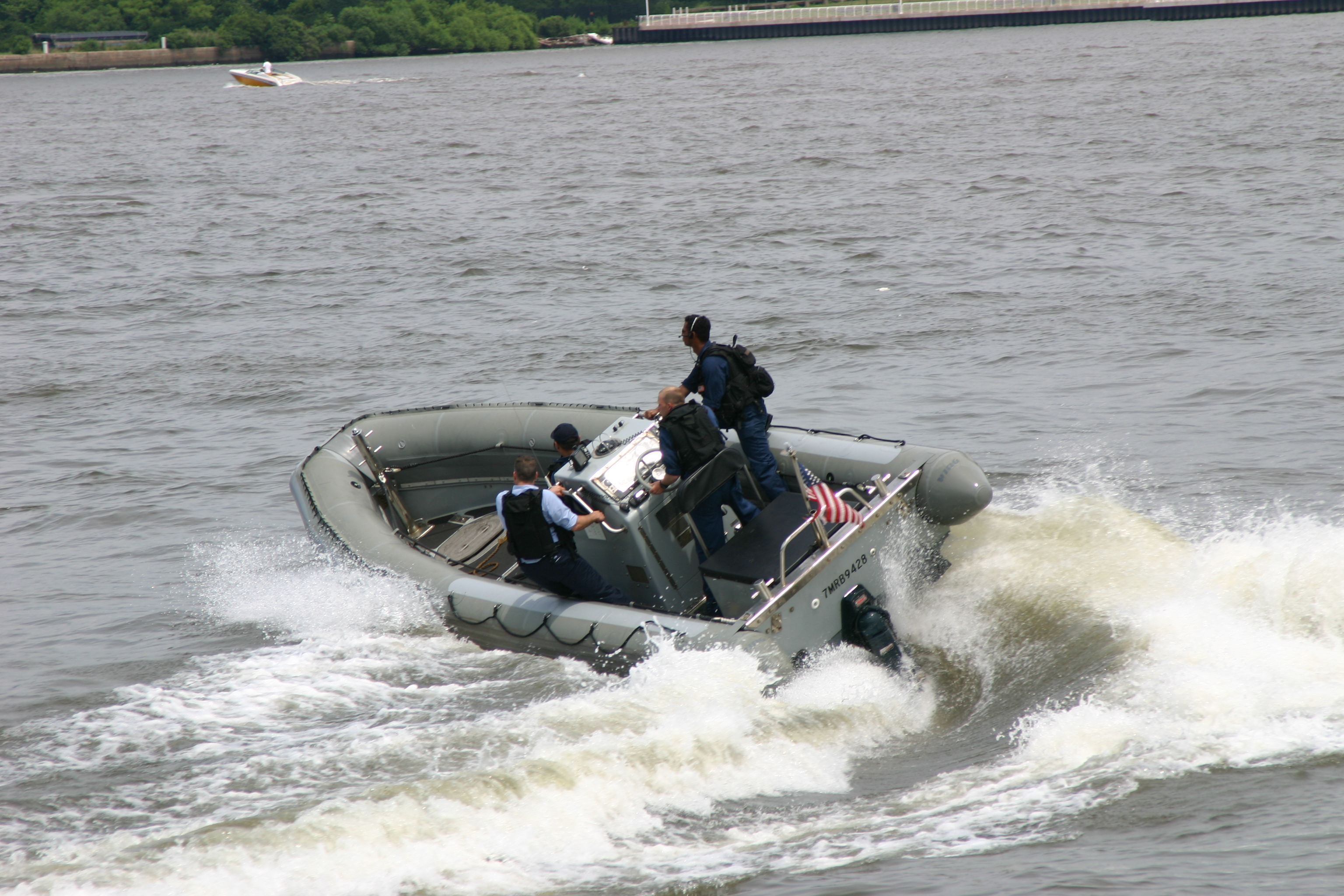
RHIB deployed from a US Navy destroyer operating in a littoral area

In the mid-1970s Avon tubes for two 21-foot RHIBs were ordered by the recently opened sister school of Atlantic College that had been established on the west coast of Canada, the Lester B. Pearson United World College of the Pacific, at Pedder Bay near Race Rocks, British Columbia in the Strait of Juan de Fuca. Three former Atlantic College students built the first hull during the summer of 1974. Three more graduates who likewise were trained as RNLI inshore lifeboat coxswains worked at the school during its inaugural year and coached some Pacific College students to build and operate the two boats, which were referred to as X-27, propelled by twin outboard engines and X-28, propelled by inboard-outboard stern drive.

During summer, the college loaned their fast rescue craft to the Canadian Coast Guard (CCG) on the west coast, which was introducing rigid inflatables into its then new summer seasonal inshore rescue boat service operation. Meanwhile, CCG inshore rescue stations on the Great Lakes were started up utilizing 5.4 metre (18 ft) Avon Seariders in the late 1970s. The CCG's inshore rescue boat crews included university students during the summer, in part due to the success of the student crews operating these ever-buoyant rescue craft at the Atlantic and Pearson Colleges.

=== Introduction to the southern hemisphere ===
The first inflatable boat manufacturer in the Southern Hemisphere is Lancer Industries of Auckland, New Zealand in 1971. The founder Chris Marks had visited Europe and brought the concept to NZ. He pioneered many of the initial inflatable boat construction and material methods. Lancers innovate designs and engineering approach to inflatable design still applies and the company holds many patents. Lancer is noted for manufacturing large RIBs, in 1987 it provided tubes for a 17m RIB and then 19 the late 1990s Protector (Rayglass) of New Zealand built two 20m RIB support boats for the Americas Cup which were tubes by Lancer.

In 1976 Steve Schmidt introduced the RHIB concept to New Zealand under the brand Naiad. While it was slow to be accepted for the first few years, it gained momentum with police, Rescue, marine farmers and Government agencies.

The Naiad RHIB developed by Steve Schmidt differed from the existing RHIB designs in two ways. It had a twin skin, incorporating an air retaining inner and a robust replaceable outer. These were held in place by tracks. This system allowed for easy removal of the outer or inner for repair or replacement. The other feature was the unusually deep variable V hull with extreme turned down chines aft.

In 1978 the demand grew for more protection in the form of an integral cabin and outboard well to protect the crew in adverse conditions. Though basic to start with cabins soon became more sophisticated. Naiad were one of the early pioneers in designing RHIBs and models range from 2.5m to 23m.

In the 2010s, the traditional RHIB was reimagined using High-Density Polyethylene (HDPE) as the hull material. HDPE, an engineered polymer, possesses a number of properties which make it a superior marine construction material for RHIB's. Of note, it absorbs vibration leading to a quieter, more comfortable ride, with less slamming load transferred to operators. HDPE does not corrode, or suffer from electrolysis, reducing maintenance costs and increasing operational availability. It was the PFG Group, of Hobart, Tasmania, who recognised and applied the advantages into RHIB construction. In partnership with One2Three Naval Architects, Stuart Downham of PFG developed a range of RHIB designs and builds which have such significantly favourable characteristics in the water that the future of RHIB's and high performance small watercraft will shift towards HDPE as the preferred hull material.

In 1979, Gemini Marine based in Cape Town started building RIBs for the local market. Early on they joined forces with the NSRI and started to design and build rescue craft for the South African Sea Rescue Institution.

== General characteristics ==
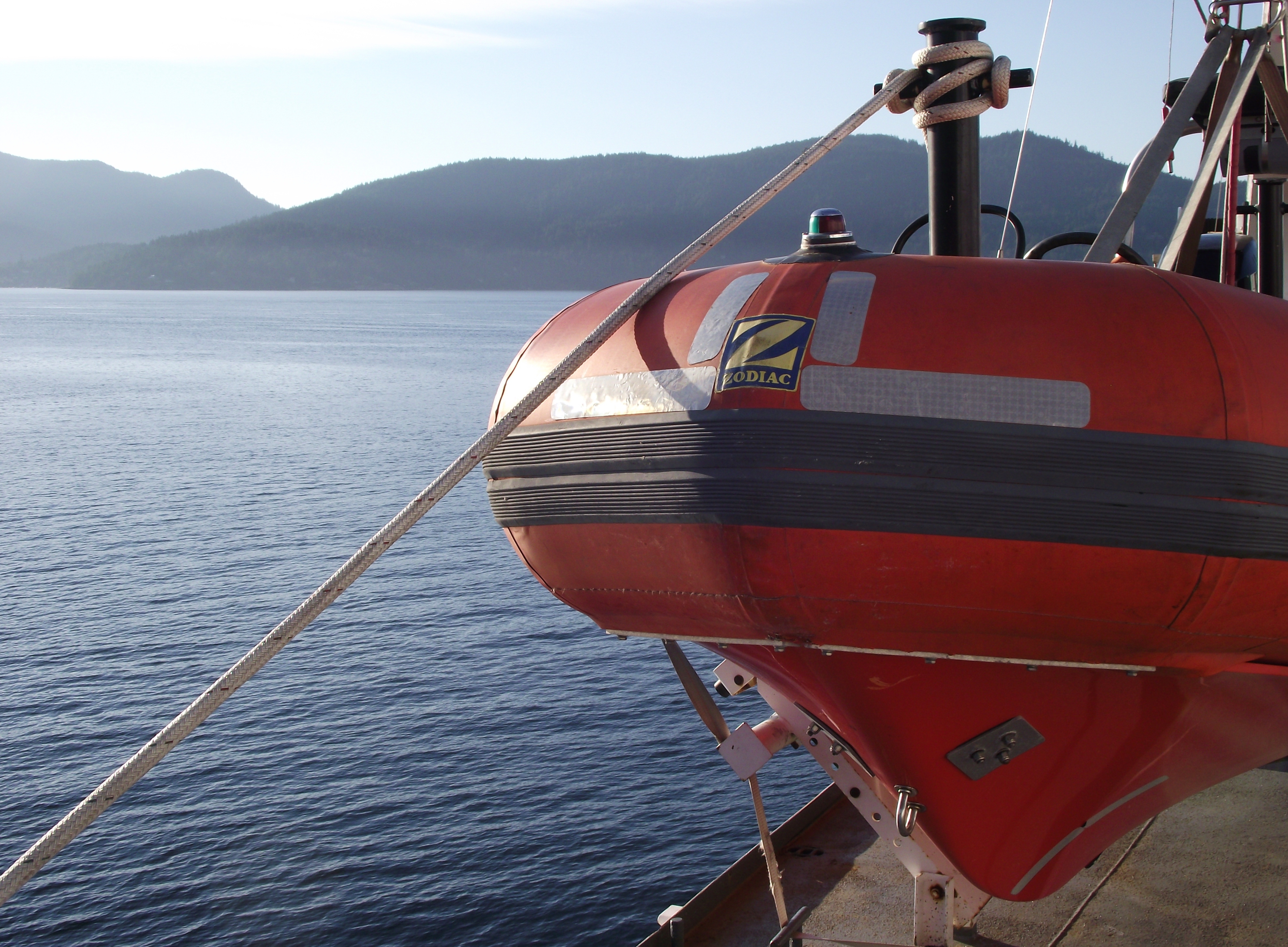
Side view of hull assembly

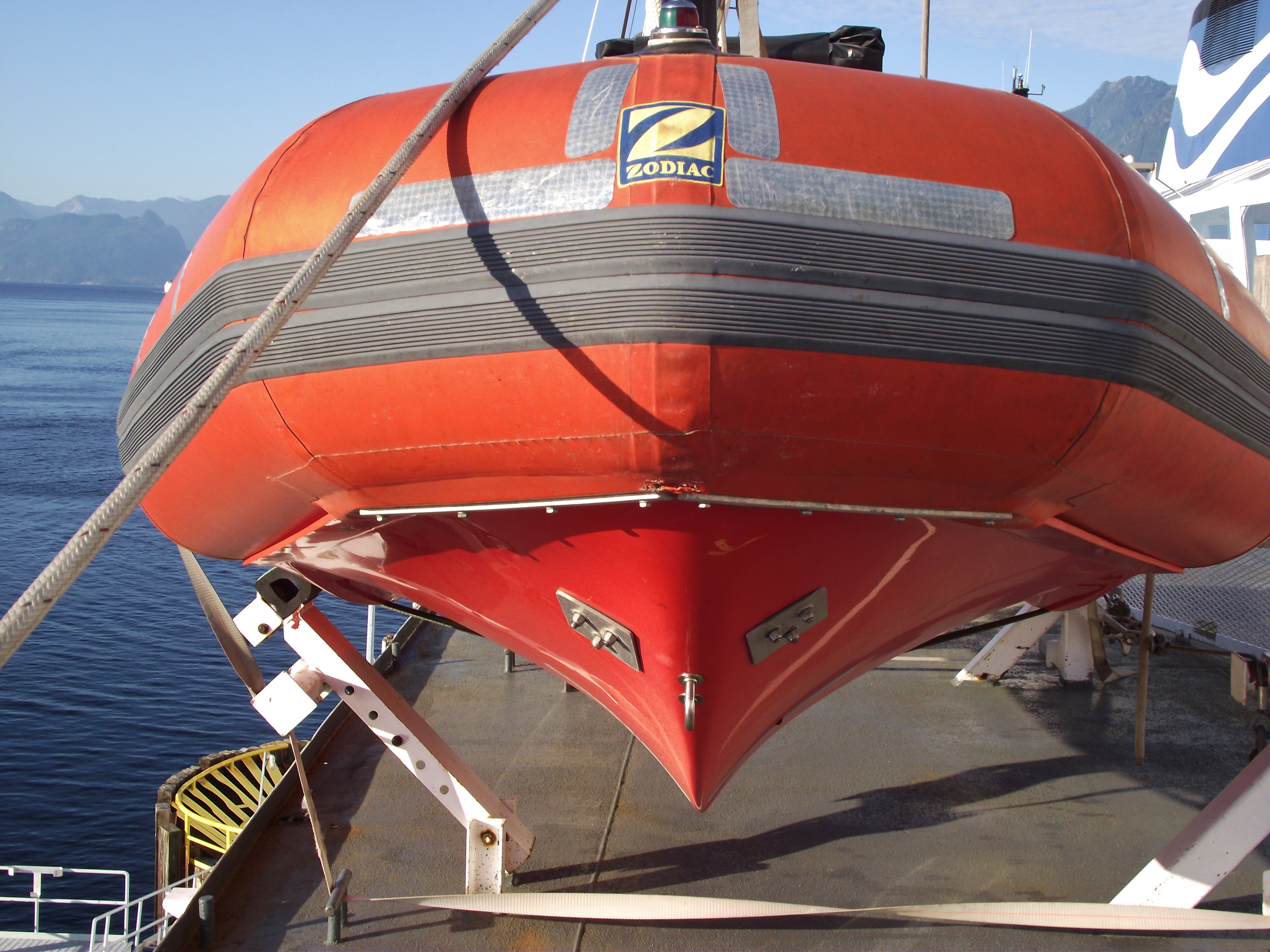
Forward hull assembly of RHIB prepared as an emergency boat on a ferry in British Columbia, Canada

RIBs are commonly four to nine metres (13 to 28 ft) long, although they can range in length between 2.5 and 18 metres (7.5 and 55 ft). A RIB is often propelled by one or more outboard motors or an inboard motor turning a water jet or stern drive. Generally, the power of the motors is in the range of 5 to 300 horsepower (4 to 224 kW).

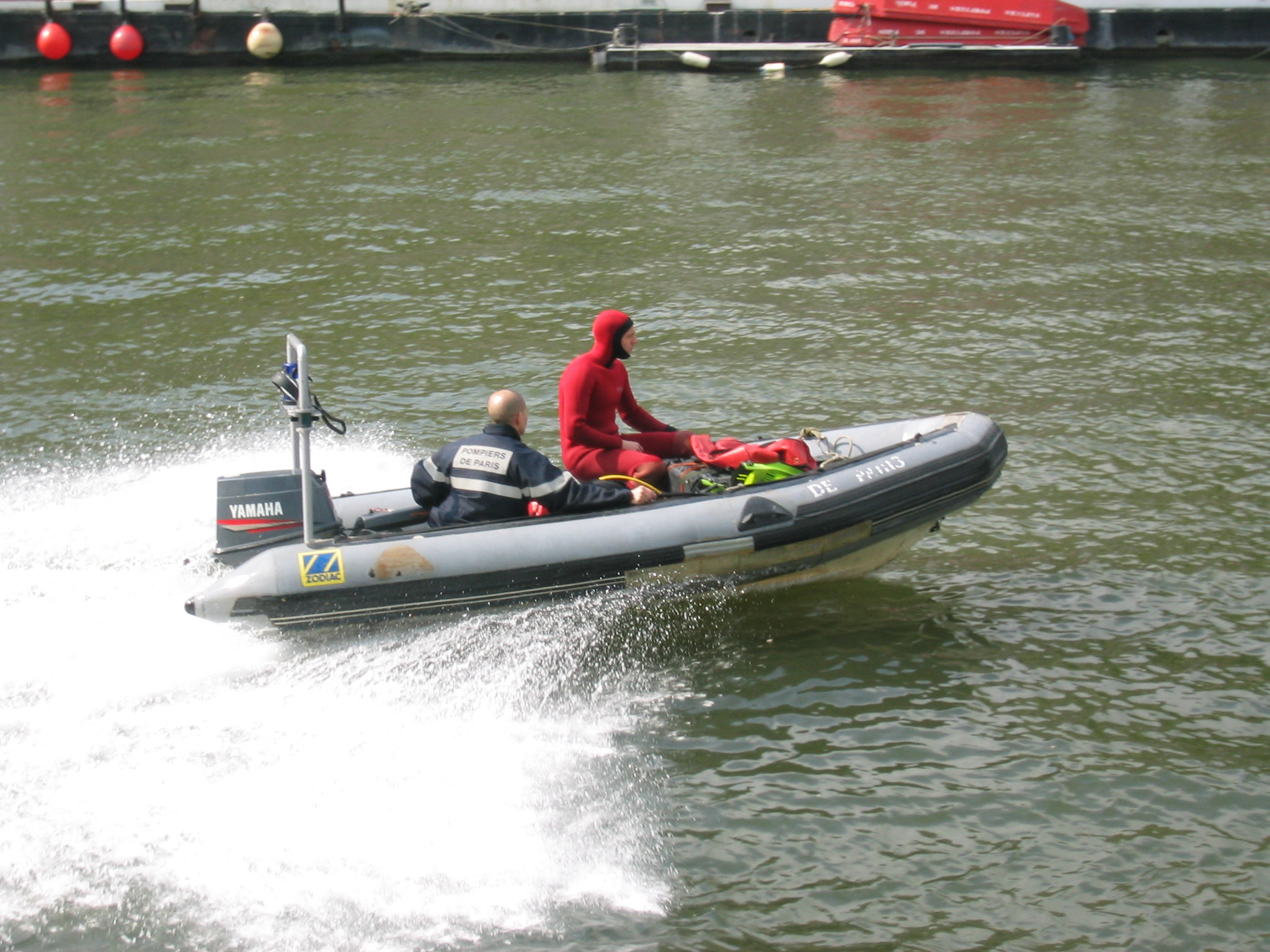
Small RHIB being used as a dive boat

RIBs are used as rescue craft, safety boats for sailing, dive boats or tenders for larger boats and ships. Their shallow draught, high maneuverability, speed and relative immunity to damage in low-speed collisions are advantages in these applications.

RIBs up to about seven metres in length can be towed on trailers on the road; this, coupled with their other properties, is making them increasingly attractive as leisure craft.

=== Performance ===
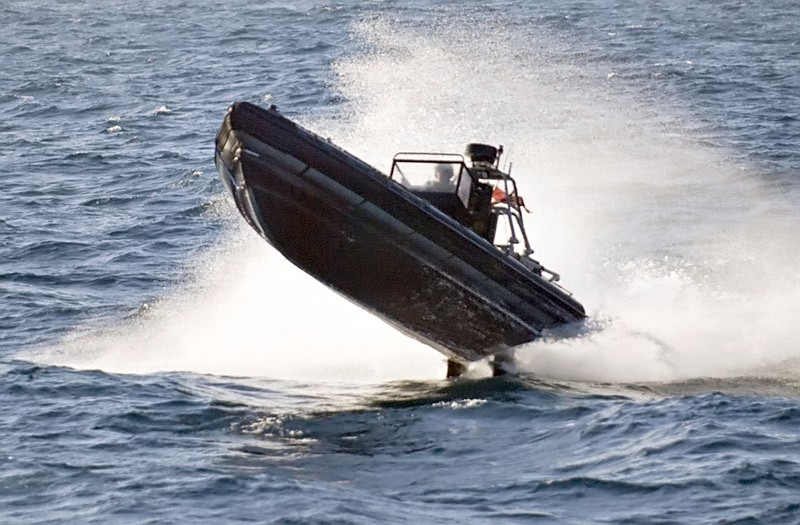
High-performance RHIB from the Danish Navy

RIBs are designed with planing hulls. Due to their low weight, RIBs often outperform some types of similarly sized and powered boats.

RIBs can also generally cope better with rougher seas, although this may be partially due to an increased level of confidence in knowing that a RIB is hard to sink, and better absorption of heavy loads by the flexible tubes, which therefore make heavy seas less unpleasant.

The maximum speed of the RIB depends on its gross weight, power, length and profile of hull, and sea conditions. A typical seaborne 6-metre (19 ft 8 in) RIB, with six passengers, 110 horsepower (82 kW) engines, in Beaufort force 2 is very likely to have a top speed of around 30 knots (56 km/h). High-Performance RIBs may operate with a speed between 40 and 70 knots (74 and 130 km/h), depending on the size and weight.

== Uses ==
Uses include work boats (supporting shore facilities or larger ships) in trades that operate on the water, military craft, where they are used in patrol roles and to transport troops between vessels or ashore, and lifeboats.

RIBs and ordinary inflatable boats are often used by scuba divers to reach dive sites.

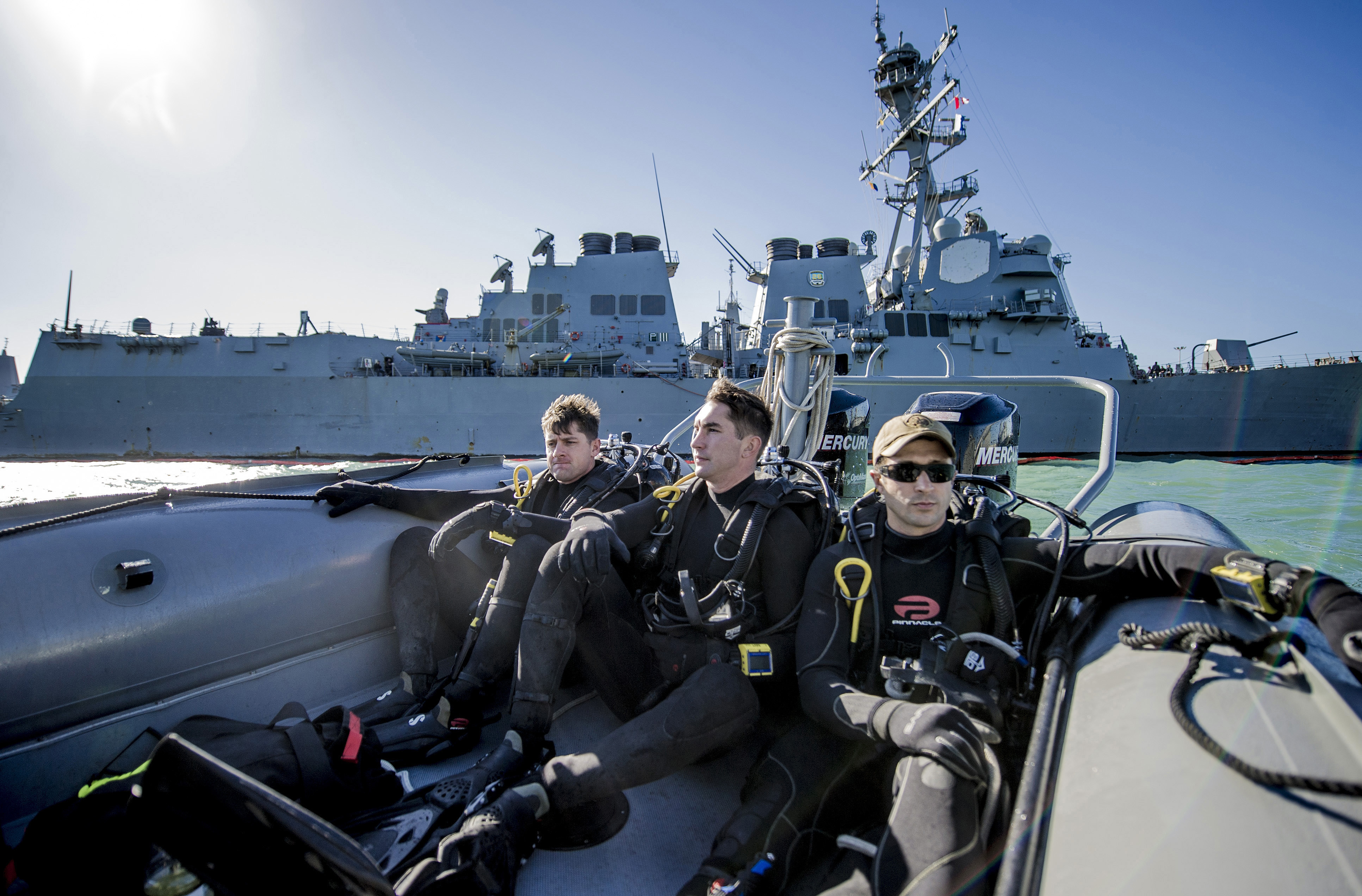
Petty officer divers in a rigid-hull inflatable boat

== Construction ==
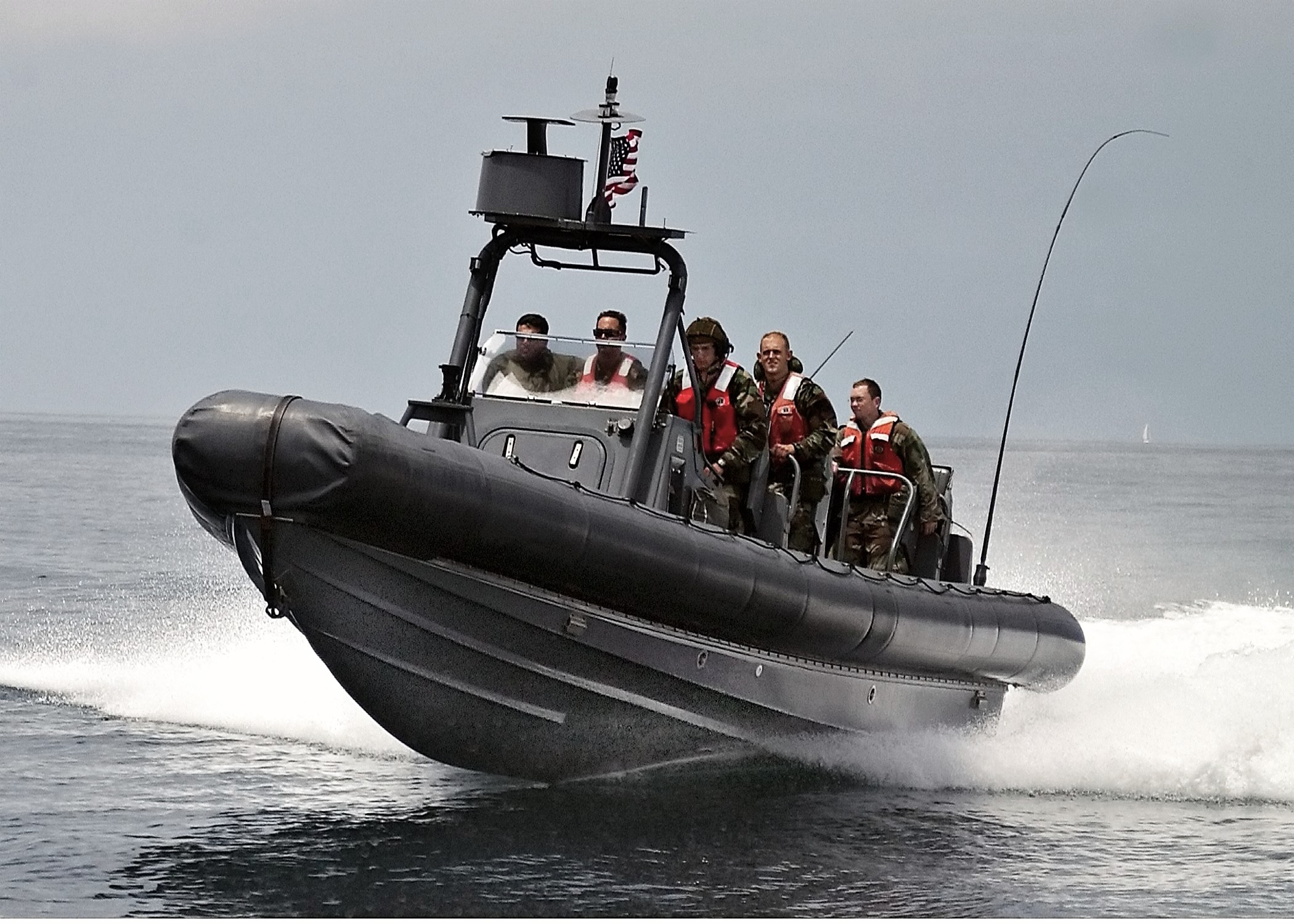
Clear view of a "Deep-V" rigid hull

=== Hull ===
The hull is made of steel, wood, aluminium, or more commonly, a combination of wood for the structure and glass-reinforced plastic (GRP) composite for the shaped and smooth surface. Some manufacturers also weave Kevlar into the GRP sheets for extra strength. The hull of a RIB is shaped to increase the performance of the boat in the water by optimising its hydroplaning characteristics. "Deep-V" hulls cut through waves easily but require greater engine power to start planing than "shallow-V" hulls, which plane at lower speed but with a more uncomfortable ride. As with the design of most boat hulls they represent a compromise of different design characteristics. Modern "all round" RIB hulls combine a deep v hull at the bow which flattens out to present a broad planing pad. This is a flat area on the rear of the hull designed to allow the boat to have a stable surface to plane on.

=== Tubes ===
The tubes are usually constructed and then partitioned with separate chambers to reduce the effect of a puncture, each with a valve to add or remove air and more recently pressure release valves. Larger boats (7m+) have six or more chambers with a valve and pressure release for each chamber. If only one of these chambers is punctured, the rest of the chambers will still provide buoyancy, providing redundancy. In recent years, tubes tend to be fitted with both valves and pressure relief valves. As temperature increases, the air inside the tube expands, opening the pressure release valves. This prevents the tubes bursting from overpressure. Common materials for the tubes are Hypalon and PVC (Polyvinyl chloride), though some manufacturers use PU (Polyurethane).

==== Hypalon ====
Chlorosulfonated Polyethylene(csm) registered under the trade name hypalon.

Tubes made of hypalon (csm/cr) are easy to manufacture and can be repaired with simple puncture repair kits. Hypalon (csm) is not airtight and so must be combined with neoprene (cr) when used to build tubes. Tubes made with Hypalon and Neoprene layers can last up to twice as long as PVC tubes and have been known to last over 20 years. Hypalon is probably the most popular material used for the construction of RIBs manufactured in the UK.

==== Polyvinyl chloride ====
As a material for building tubes, polyvinyl chloride (PVC) has the disadvantage of lacking flexibility. To make it supple, an additive is used with the polymer. This additive vaporizes as the material ages, making the PVC brittle and allowing it to crack. A PVC tube is the cheapest option and can last approximately 10–15 years.

PVC does have some advantages, it is cheap, it can be welded, and it is guaranteed for longer than hypalon. PVC RIBs are usually very well made and with welded seams they are less prone to blowouts and leaks.

A newer form of PVC has made its way into production. Known as valmex it is said to have a blackout layer on the inside to reduce UV damage to the adhesives usually used to fix tubes to the hulls and various other parts.

==== Polyurethane ====
Tubes made of polyurethane (PU) are difficult to manufacture and are consequently not often used for RHIB construction. PU has an advantage of being very tough, it can be made knife-proof or bulletproof. Earlier PU had a disadvantage of aging quickly, but newer types are much more resistant to degradation when exposed to ultraviolet-light. The issue with most of the older PU built RIBs is theUV rays and heat penetrate the fabric and, much like with PVC, destroy the adhesive bond. More recent fabrics are said to have a blackout layer to help combat UV rays.

While PU tubes have been thermal welded, fittings and attachments will still usually be bonded using adhesives. A high-quality PU-made tube lasts over 20 years. PU tubes are often to be found on commercial RIBs, in applications where strength and durability are needed. Replacing the tubes when they wear out usually costs one third as much as the complete RIB.

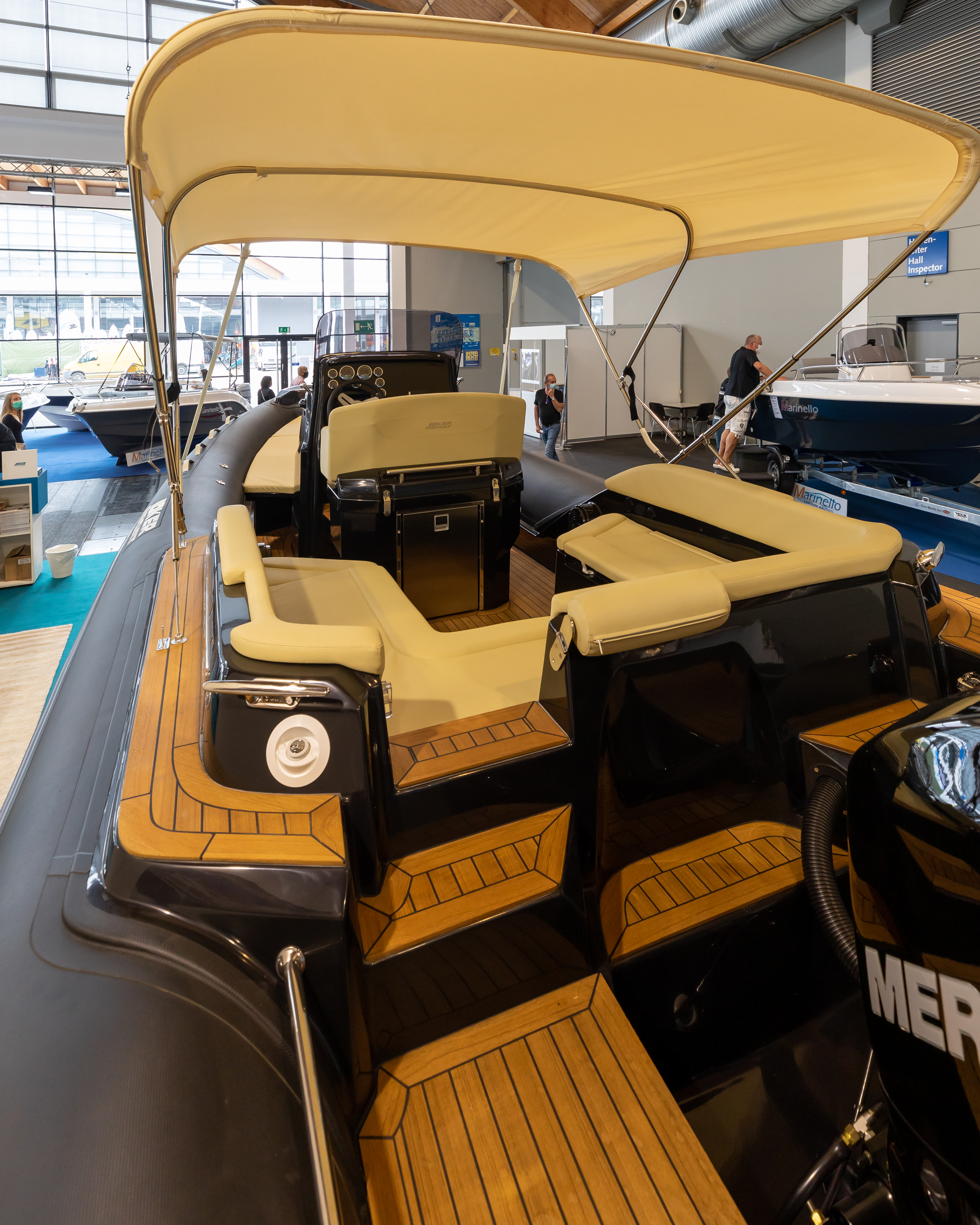
RHIB with Bimini top outfitted as a pleasure craft

=== Wheelhouse/cabins ===
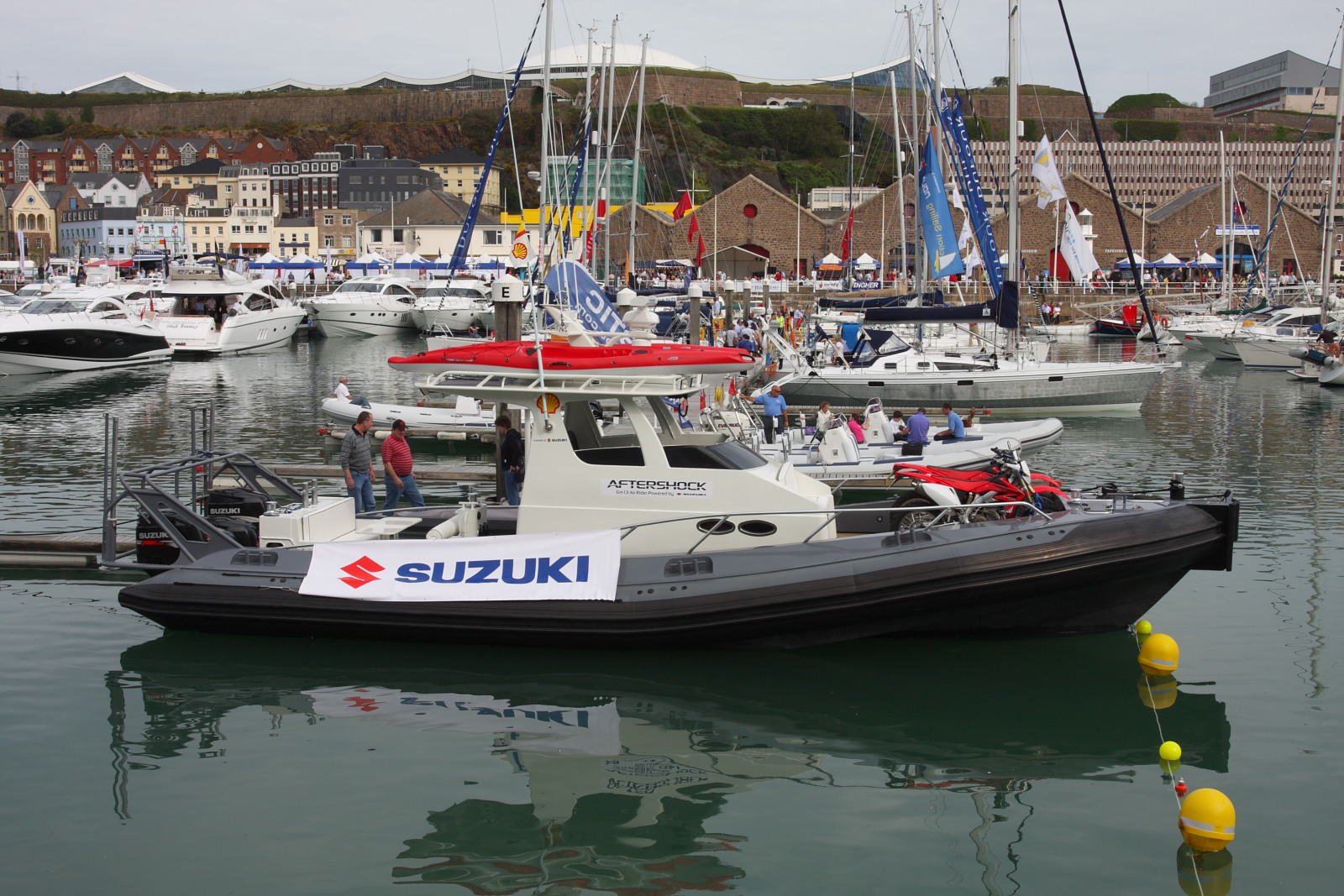
RIB with a small wheelhouse

Larger RIBs can have hard-tops or wheelhouses made of GRP or aluminium. Wheelhouses offer protection from the elements to both the crew and passengers – and can also protect equipment such as suspension seats and navigation equipment. Some RIB manufacturers, particularly those popular in Ireland and the West Coast of Scotland provide optional canopies which form fabric and perspex wheelhouses but can be easily removed in good weather. Increasingly, RIBs are becoming available with small cabins (usually with accommodation for two people and in some cases sea toilets or chemical toilets), widening the application of RIBs as cruising craft.

==== Seafari setup ====
Seafari boats are set up to accommodate tourists for a typically smaller duration. Typical setups use jockey seating to accommodate passengers. Coding in the UK and the EU typically limits the number of passengers to 12 while in some countries, such as Poland, more seats are placed on the boat. Thrill rides are common with high speeds and turns adding to their lure.

=== Tube replacement ===
Tube replacement, also known as collar replacement, retubing, or a re-tube, is where the old damaged or worn out tubes are removed and new tubes are fitted. This is a common practice and tubes are replaced with new hypalon, PVC or polyurethane tubes. Most commonly hypalon replacements are used unless the boat has a slide on tube rail luff system implemented.

== Special subtypes ==
=== Foldable rigid inflatable boat (FRIB) ===
A foldable rigid inflatable boat has a 3-section articulated folding rigid hull. The hull sections have interlocking tabs and slots, held together by the pressure in the tubes. Once assembled it's difficult to tell they fold. Once inflated, they are fully rigid.

=== Flying inflatable boat (FIB) ===
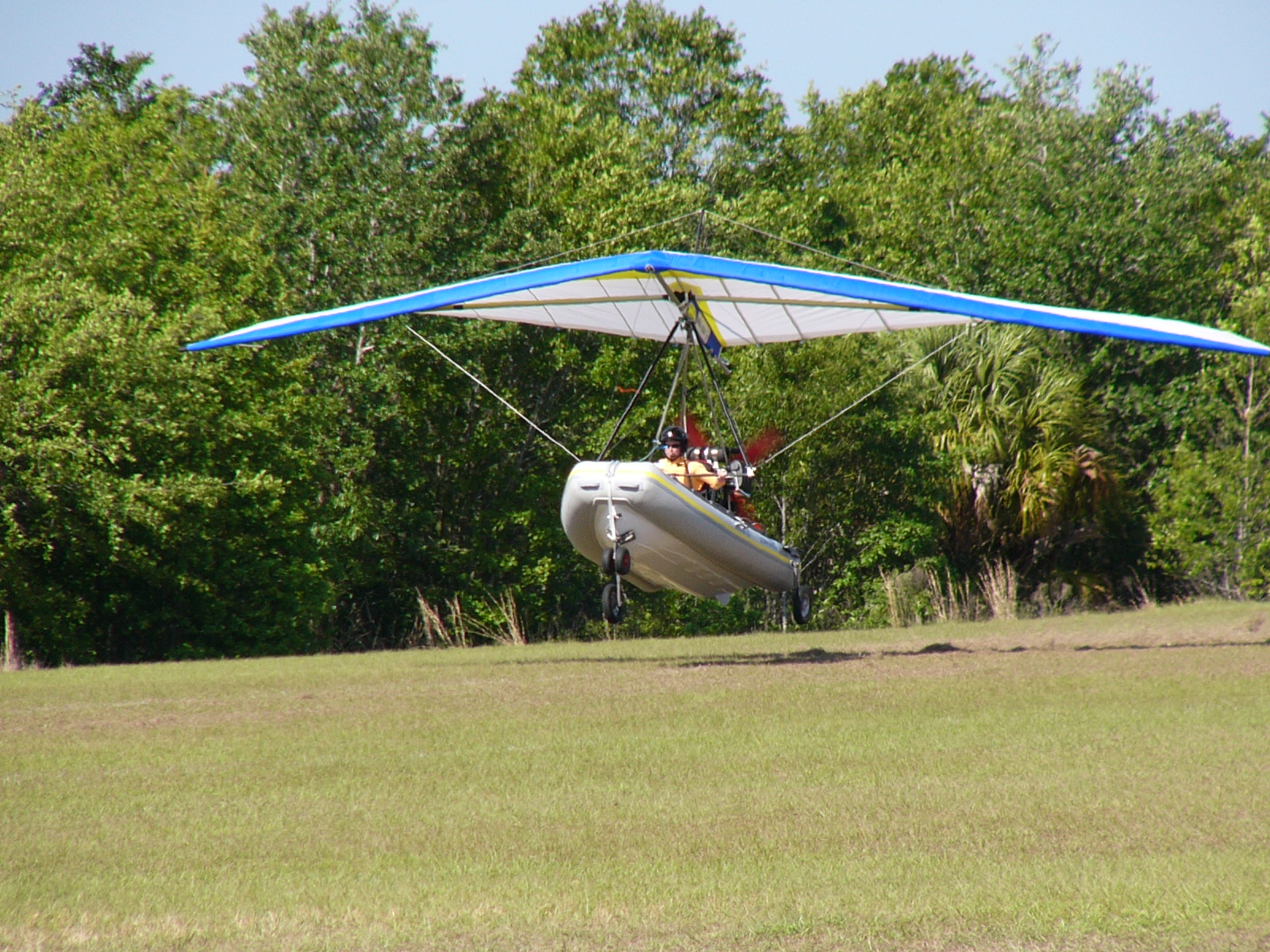
Polaris AM-FIB

A flying inflatable boat, or FIB, is a RIB with microlight-type wings and air propeller. "FIB" is used as a model name by Polaris Motor of Italy for their Polaris FIB.

=== Amphibious rigid inflatable boat (amphibious RIB) ===
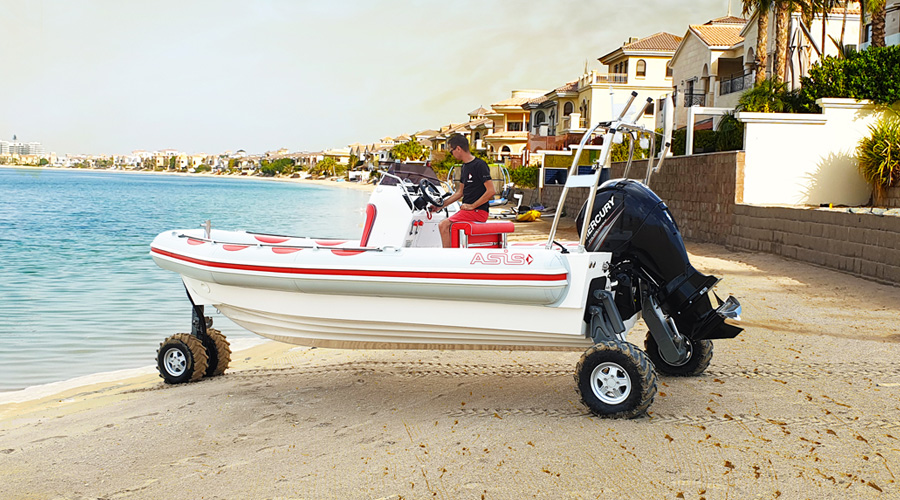
4WD amphibious RIB

The amphibious rigid inflatable boat is designed with a four wheels drive system consisting of motorized, retractable and steerable wheels.

== See also ==
- Subskimmer for a RIB that can transform into a submerged diver propulsion vehicle and back.
