= Polaris (ship) =

A number of ships have been named Polaris:

- Polaris (icebreaker), a 2016 Finnish icebreaker
- Polaris (motor yacht), a 1930 motor yacht that later became the U.S. Navy patrol vessel USS Amber (PYc-6)
- Polaris (sailing yacht), a sailing yacht converted from HSwMS Polaris (T103), a Swedish Royal Navy torpedo boat; see List of large sailing yachts
- Polaris (research vessel), listed on the National Register of Historic Places listings in San Mateo County, California
- MS Polaris, a 1968 Russian-owned passenger ship built in Denmark; also known variously as Brand Polaris (2001–2003) and Viking Polaris (2003–2005)
- MV Polaris (1914), a Norwegian sealer shipwrecked in 1942
- HSwMS Polaris, a Swedish Royal Navy shipname
  - HSwMS Polaris (1909), a 1909 Swedish Royal Navy 1.-class torpedo boat
  - HSwMS Polaris (T103), a Swedish Navy torpedo boat, later converted into a sailing yacht; see List of torpedo boats of the Swedish Navy
- HMAS Polaris (FY 63), a Royal Australian Navy trawler survey tender
- USS Polaris, a U.S. Navy shipname
  - USS Polaris (1871), a steamer sunk in 1872 on an Arctic expedition
  - USS Polaris (AF-11), a freighter built in 1938

== Ship and boat classes ==
- Polaris surveillance vessel, see List of Japan Coast Guard vessels and aircraft

== See also ==
- Polaris (disambiguation)
- HMT Stella Polaris, a British Royal Navy trawler; see List of requisitioned trawlers of the Royal Navy (WWII)
- Crimson Polaris, a cargo ship
- Polaris Motor, an Italian company
- Polaris Inc., a U.S. company
