= Polaris (disambiguation) =

Polaris is a star in the constellation Ursa Minor, also known as the North Star.

Polaris may also refer to:

== Geography ==
- Polaris, California, in Nevada County, United States
- Polaris, Montana, in Beaverhead County, United States
- Polaris mine, Little Cornwallis Island, Nunavut, Canada

== Arts, entertainment, and media ==
=== Fictional entities ===
- Polaris (Marvel Comics), a Marvel Comics superhero
- Polaris galaxy, featured in the video game Ratchet & Clank Future: Tools of Destruction
- Polaris, the ultimate antagonist of the video game Shin Megami Tensei: Devil Survivor 2
- Polaris Hilda, character from the Saint Seiya anime and manga/comics
- Doctor Polaris, a DC Comics villain
- Polaris P. Polanski, an alias of Byakuya Togami in the novel Danganronpa Togami, by Yuya Sato

=== Games ===
- Polaris (video game), a 1980 video game
- Polaris (1997 role-playing game)
- Polaris (2005 role-playing game)

=== Literature ===
- Polaris (novel), by Jack McDevitt
- "Polaris" (short story), by H. P. Lovecraft

=== Music ===
==== Groups ====
- Polaris (Australian band), an Australian metalcore band
- Polaris (American band), an American rock band

==== Albums and EPs ====
- Polaris (Kangta album), 2001
- Polaris (Stratovarius album), 2009
- Polaris (Tesseract album), 2015
- Polaris (EP), 2020 EP by Aitch

==== Compositions and songs ====
- Polaris (composition), 2010 composition by Thomas Adès
- "Polaris" (Ash song), 2007, from the album Twilight of the Innocents
- "Polaris" (Hitorie song), 2018
- "Polaris", from the album Futures by Jimmy Eat World
- "Rust in Peace... Polaris", from the album Rust in Peace by Megadeth
- "Polaris" (ポラリス), from the album Karma by MUCC
- "Polaris", from the single Silent Bible by Nana Mizuki
- "Polaris", from the album Nocturne by The Human Abstract
- "Polaris", from the album Simple Things by Zero 7
- "Polaris", the sixth opening theme for My Hero Academia and the first for season 4, by Blue Encount
- "Polaris", from the album After the Magic by Parannoul

==== Prizes ====
- Polaris Music Prize

=== Other uses in arts, entertainment, and media ===
- Polaris (2016 film), a 2016 film directed by Soudabeh Moradian
- Polaris (2022 film), a 2022 film directed by Kirsten Carthew
- Polaris (periodical), produced by Visual Collaborative
- Polaris Tower, a giant Ferris wheel at Kumdori Land, Yuseong-gu, Daejon, Korea
- Polaris, a subsidiary of Disney Digital Network specialising in video game culture

== Brands and enterprises ==
- Polaris drinking water, a Thai bottled water brand
- Polaris Entertainment, South Korean record label
- Polaris Fashion Place, Columbus, Ohio, a two level shopping mall and surrounding retail plaza
- Polaris Inc., American snowmobile, ATV, and motorcycle manufacturer
- Polaris Motor, an Italian ultralight trike manufacturer
- Polaris Pro Grappling, a British grappling tournament running since 2015

== Computing ==
- Polaris (poker bot)
- Polaris (processor)
- Polaris, the GPU architecture featured in AMD's Radeon RX 400 and RX 500 series
- Polaris, an integrated library system from Innovative Interfaces, Inc.
- Polaris, a port of Solaris to PowerPC
- Polaris, the development codename for Windows Media Player (WMP) version 11
- Polaris Office, office suite that runs on mobile platforms

== Military ==
- Polaris spacecraft, or TecSAR, Israeli reconnaissance satellite
- Pukguksong-1 (translated as Polaris-1 and also known as KN-11), a North Korean submarine-launched ballistic missile
- UGM-27 Polaris, an early United States submarine-launched ballistic missile that was also used by United Kingdom
- Polaris (UK nuclear programme), a British nuclear weapons programme for Resolution-class ballistic missile submarines

== Transport ==
- Polaris (train), manufactured in China
- Polaris program, a commercial human spaceflight project
- Polaris Dawn, a private spaceflight mission that took place in 2024

=== Aviation ===
- Airbus CC-150 Polaris, a Canadian military plane
- B&F Fk14 Polaris, a German ultralight aircraft
- Polaris, United Airlines business class product
- Polaris Award, awarded to airline crews

=== Ships ===
- Polaris (ship), a list of ships
- Polaris (icebreaker), a 2015 Finnish icebreaker
- MS Polaris, a Russian-owned passenger ship built in Denmark in 1968
- RV Polaris, listed on the National Register of Historic Places listings in San Mateo County, California
- USS Amber (PYc-6), known as Polaris, a 1930 motor yacht that later became a patrol vessel
- USS Polaris, a steamer sunk in 1872 on an Arctic expedition
- USS Polaris (AF-11), a freighter built in 1938

== Other uses ==
- Polaris (convention), an annual science fiction and fantasy convention
- POLARIS (seismology), an underground experiment to observe seismic signals
- Polaris expedition, an American attempt to reach the North Pole which resulted in Commander Charles F. Hall's suspicious death
- Project Polaris, a U.S.-Canadian military aerial survey of the Canadian Arctic Archipelago
- Polaris Project, an American anti-human-trafficking organization
- Helion Polaris, a prototype fusion reactor

== See also ==
- Polestar (disambiguation)
- Polar (disambiguation)
- Polara (disambiguation)
- Polari, a form of cant slang
- North Star (disambiguation)
