= Polaris Skin =

Italian ultralight trike

Skin

General information
- Type: Ultralight trike
- National origin: Italy
- Manufacturer: Polaris Motor
- Status: Production completed (2014)

History
- Introduction date: early 1980s

The Polaris Skin is an Italian ultralight trike, that was designed and produced by Polaris Motor of Gubbio. The aircraft was supplied as a complete ready-to-fly-aircraft.

By 2014 the company website was listed as "under construction", then was taken down and the company went out of business.

== Design and development ==
Designed and first flown in the early 1980s, the Skin complies with the Fédération Aéronautique Internationale microlight category, including the category's maximum gross weight of 450 kg (992 lb). The Skin has a maximum gross weight of 360 kg (794 lb). It features a cable-braced hang glider-style high-wing, weight-shift controls, a two-seats-in-tandem open cockpit with an optional cockpit fairing, tricycle landing gear with wheel pants and a single engine in pusher configuration.

The aircraft is made from steel and bolted-together aluminum tubing, with its double surface wing covered in Dacron sailcloth. Its 10.60 m (34.8 ft) span wing is supported by a single tube-type kingpost and uses an "A" frame weight-shift control bar. The powerplant is a twin cylinder, air-cooled, two-stroke, dual-ignition 50 hp (37 kW) Rotax 503 or the liquid-cooled 64 hp (48 kW) Rotax 582 engine. With the Rotax 503 powerplant the aircraft has an empty weight of 155 kg (342 lb) and a gross weight of 360 kg (794 lb), giving a useful load of 205 kg (452 lb). With full fuel of 60 litres (13 imp gal; 16 US gal) the payload is 162 kg (357 lb).

A number of different wings can be fitted to the basic carriage, including the Gryps 14, Gyps 16, Gyps 19 and the Ares 21.

== Specifications (Skin with Gyps 16 wing) ==
Data from Bayerl

General characteristics

- Crew: one
- Capacity: one passenger
- Wingspan: 10.60 m (34 ft 9 in)
- Wing area: 15.8 m^{2} (170 sq ft)
- Empty weight: 155 kg (342 lb)
- Gross weight: 360 kg (794 lb)
- Fuel capacity: 60 litres (13 imp gal; 16 US gal)
- Powerplant: 1 × Rotax 503 twin cylinder, air-cooled, two stroke aircraft engine, 37 kW (50 hp)
- Propellers: 4-bladed composite

Performance

- Maximum speed: 93 km/h (58 mph, 50 kn)
- Stall speed: 45 km/h (28 mph, 24 kn)
- Rate of climb: 3.5 m/s (690 ft/min)
- Wing loading: 22.8 kg/m^{2} (4.7 lb/sq ft)
