= Polara =

Polara may refer to

- Polara (band), an American rock band
  - Polara (album), a 1995 album by the band
- Polara Golf, an American golf ball manufacturer
- Dodge Polara, an automobile model

== See also ==
- Polari
- Polaris (disambiguation)
