= USS Polaris =

USS Polaris is a name used more than once by the United States Navy:

- USS Polaris (1871), a converted Civil War screw steamer used on the Polaris expedition
- USS Polaris (AF-11), built in 1939 as SS Donald McKay and acquired from the Maritime Commission on 27 January 1941

== See also ==
- Polaris (ship)
