= Polaris FIB =

Italian ultralight trike

AM-FIB
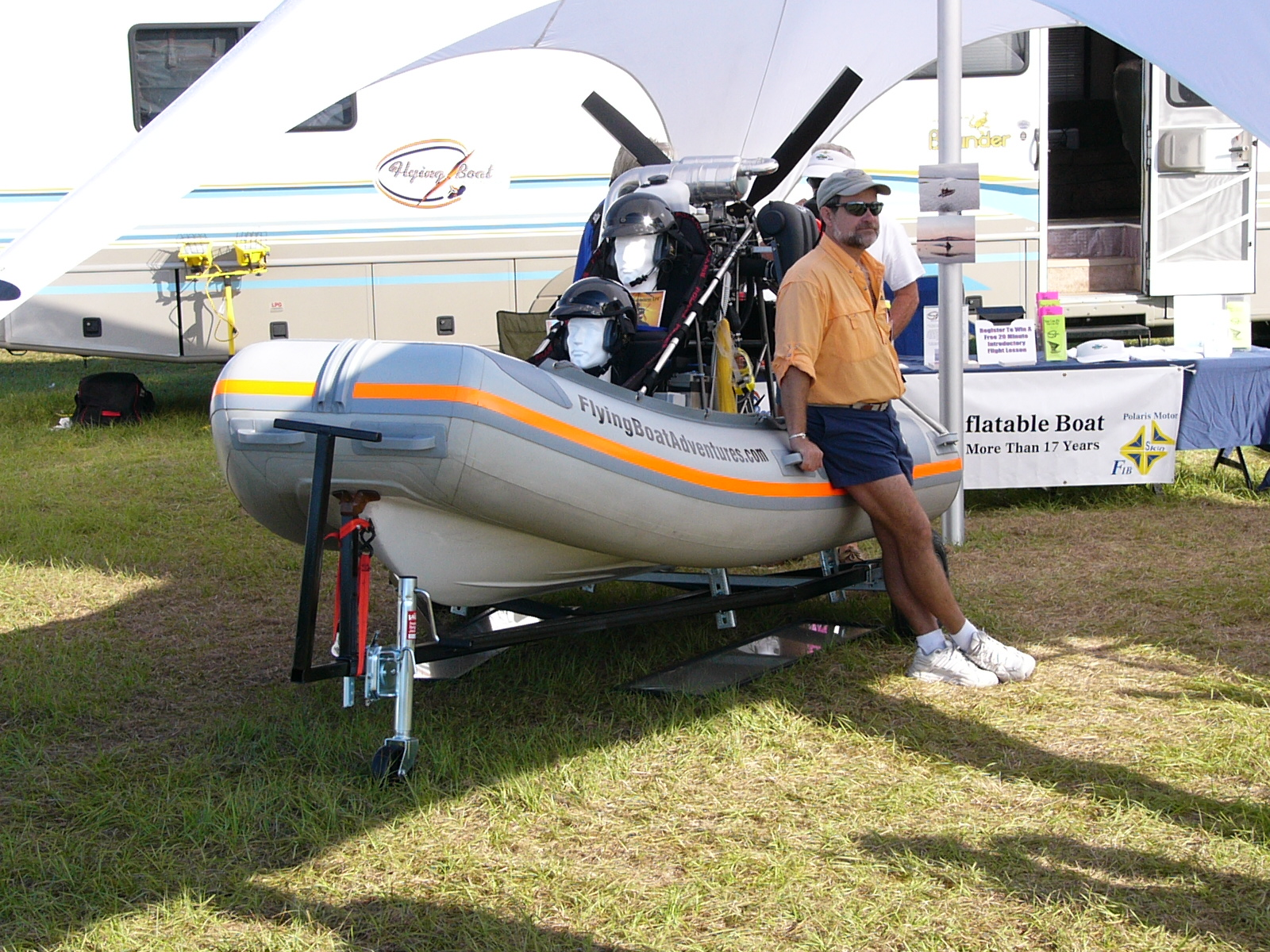
- Polaris FIB hull and motor on display at Sun 'n Fun 2004

General information
- Type: Ultralight trike
- National origin: Italy
- Manufacturer: Polaris Motor
- Status: In production (2013)

History
- Introduction date: mid-1980s
- Variant: Polaris AM-FIB

The Polaris FIB ("Flying Inflatable Boat") is an Italian flying boat ultralight trike, designed and produced by Polaris Motor of Gubbio. The aircraft was introduced in the mid-1980s and remains in production. It is supplied as a complete ready-to-fly-aircraft.

== Design and development ==
The FIB complies with the Fédération Aéronautique Internationale microlight category, including the category's maximum gross weight of 450 kg (992 lb). The FIB has a maximum gross weight of 406 kg (895 lb).

The aircraft features a cable-braced hang glider-style high-wing, weight-shift controls, a two-seats-in-tandem open cockpit, an inflatable boat hull and a single engine in pusher configuration. The FIB has no wheeled landing gear, but as a result of customer demand it was later developed into the amphibious Polaris AM-FIB.

The FIB's single surface wing is made from bolted-together aluminum tubing and covered in Dacron sailcloth. The 11.15 m (36.6 ft) span wing is supported by a single tube-type kingpost and uses an "A" frame weight-shift control bar. The powerplant is a twin cylinder, liquid-cooled, two-stroke, dual-ignition 64 hp (48 kW) Rotax 582 engine.

The aircraft has an empty weight of 216 kg (476 lb) and a gross weight of 406 kg (895 lb), giving a useful load of 190 kg (419 lb). With full fuel of 40 litres (8.8 imp gal; 11 US gal) the payload is 161 kg (355 lb).

The company continues to develop the design and in 2010 introduced a new hull shape to increase performance in the water and in the air.

Dimitri Delemarie, writing in The World Directory of Leisure Aviation 2011-12, said of the design, "It will never win any speed records, but if there were an award for fun, it would be right up there at the top."

Since 1986 Polaris Motor has sold an average of 80-100 trikes and 200 wings per year. Naturally all Polaris wings can be easily installed in other brands of trikes, with the possibility of personalization.

== Operational history ==
The FIB is used by a number of government operators, including police and coastguards.

== Variants ==
In the early 2000s the company offered a version with the same wing, but without a boat hull, using a conventional minimalist trike frame mounted on wheeled landing gear or optionally skis. Even though it did not have a boat hull it was still marketed under the FIB name.

== Specifications (FIB) ==
Data from Bayerl

General characteristics

- Crew: one
- Capacity: one passenger
- Wingspan: 11.15 m (36 ft 7 in)
- Wing area: 19.6 m^{2} (211 sq ft)
- Empty weight: 216 kg (476 lb)
- Gross weight: 406 kg (895 lb)
- Fuel capacity: 40 litres (8.8 imp gal; 11 US gal)
- Powerplant: 1 × Rotax 582 twin cylinder, liquid-cooled, two stroke aircraft engine, 48 kW (64 hp)
- Propellers: 3-bladed composite

Performance

- Maximum speed: 80 km/h (50 mph, 43 kn)
- Cruise speed: 70 km/h (43 mph, 38 kn)
- Stall speed: 48 km/h (30 mph, 26 kn)
- Rate of climb: 4.5 m/s (890 ft/min)
- Wing loading: 20.7 kg/m^{2} (4.2 lb/sq ft)
