= Polaris AM-FIB =

Italian amphibious ultralight trike

AM-FIB
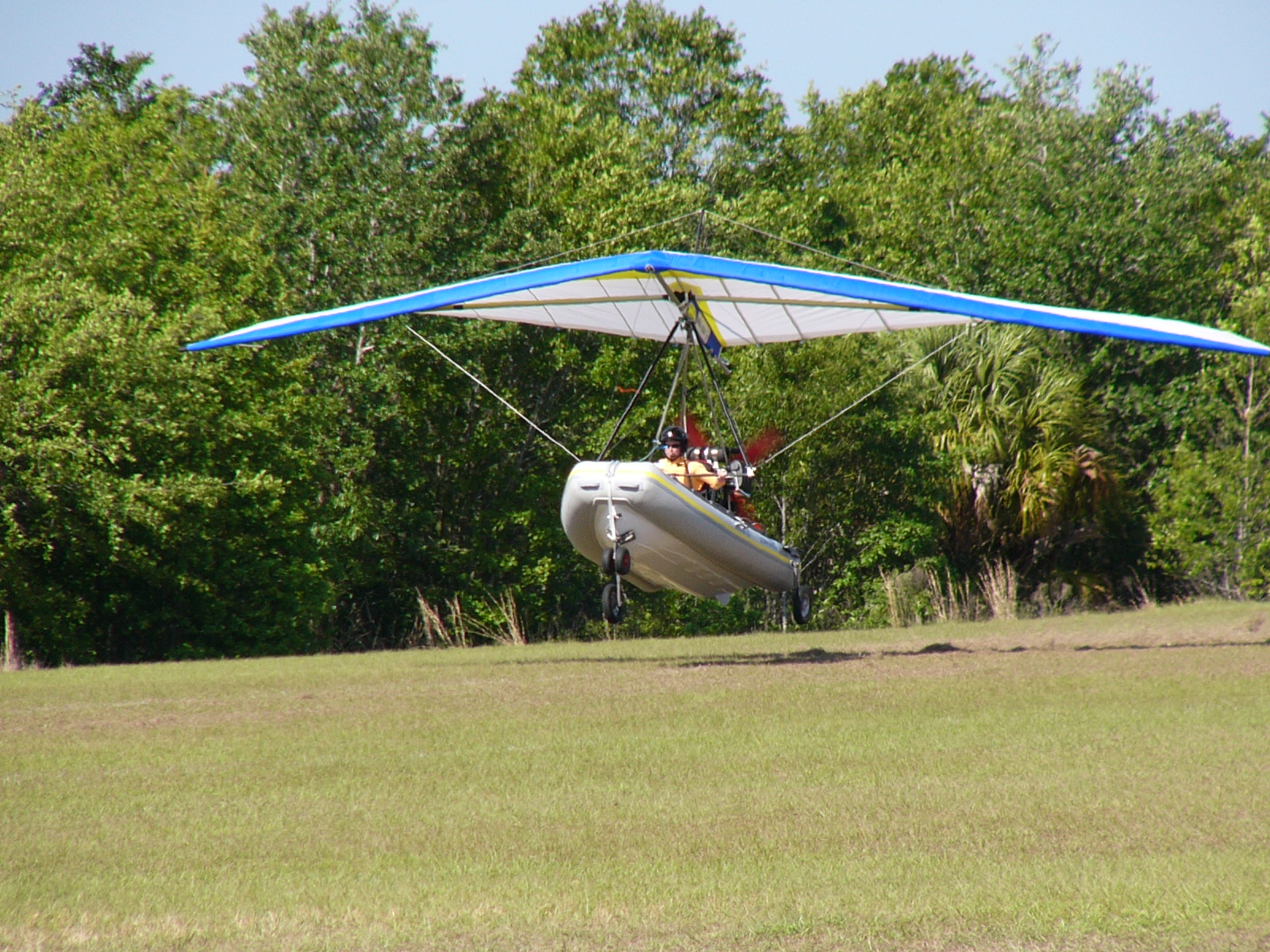

General information
- Type: Ultralight trike
- National origin: Italy
- Manufacturer: Polaris Motor
- Status: temporarily suspended

History
- Introduction date: 2003
- Developed from: Polaris FIB

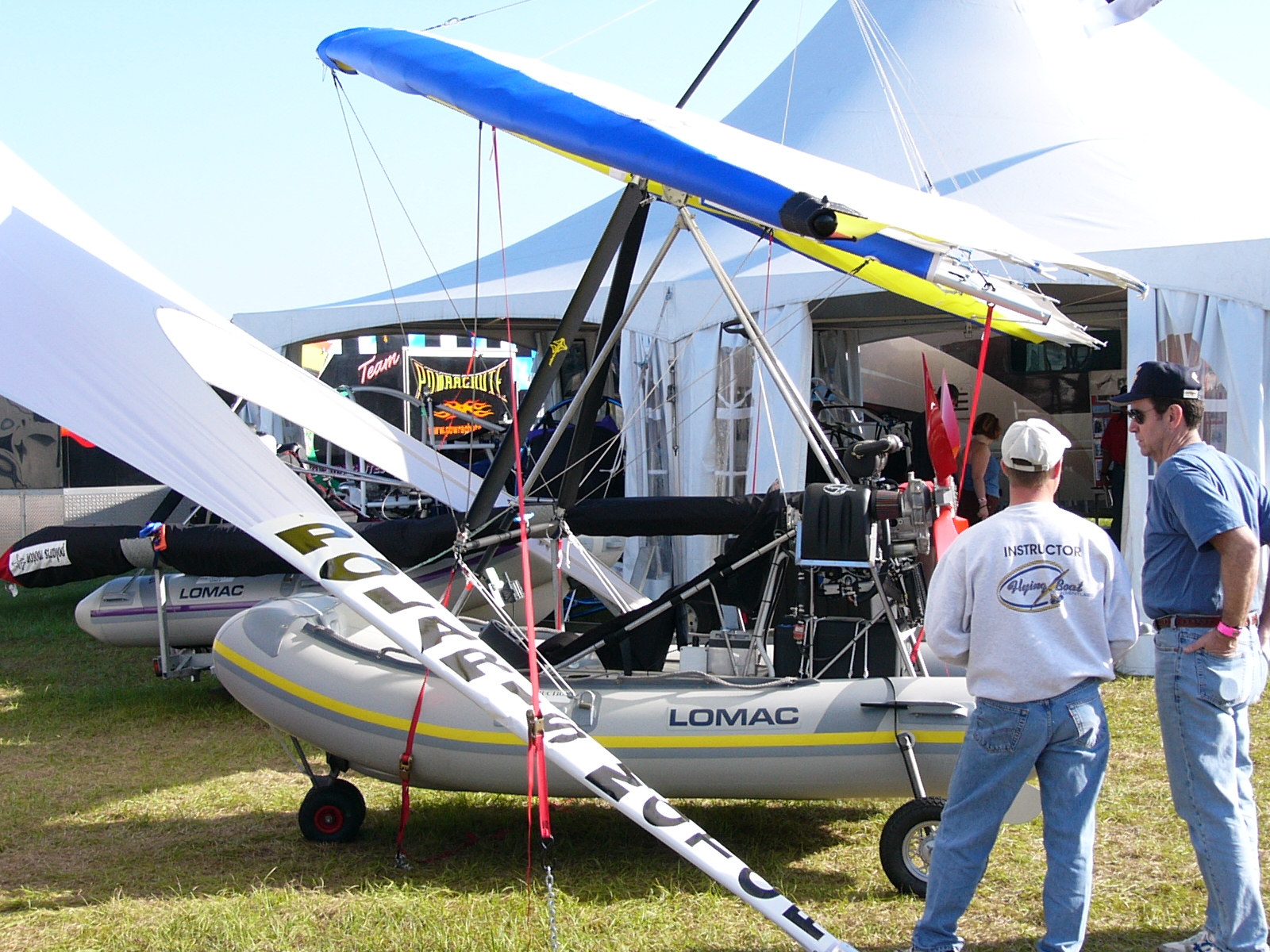
Polaris AM-FIB at Sun 'n Fun 2004

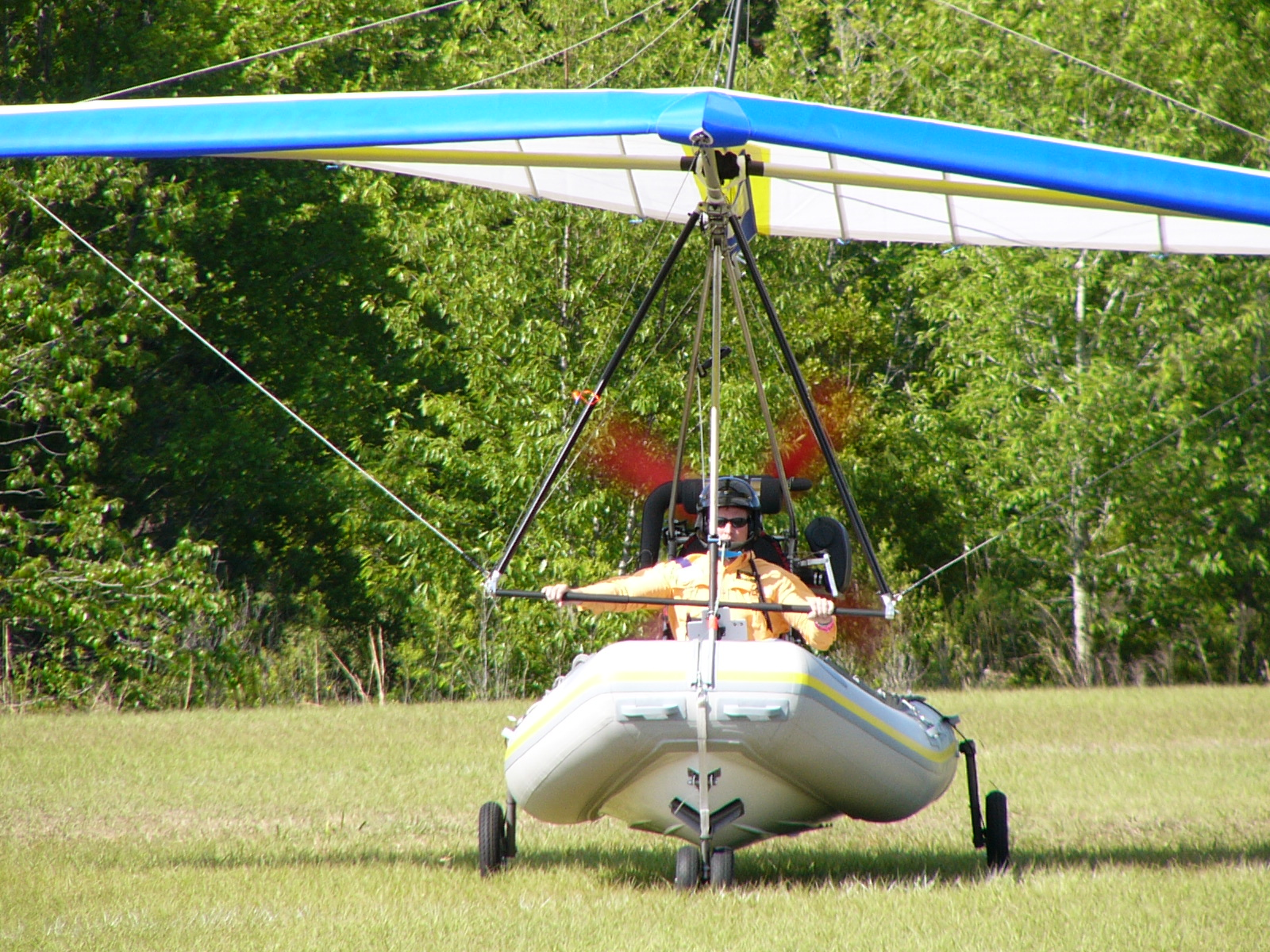
Polaris AM-FIB at Sun 'n Fun 2004

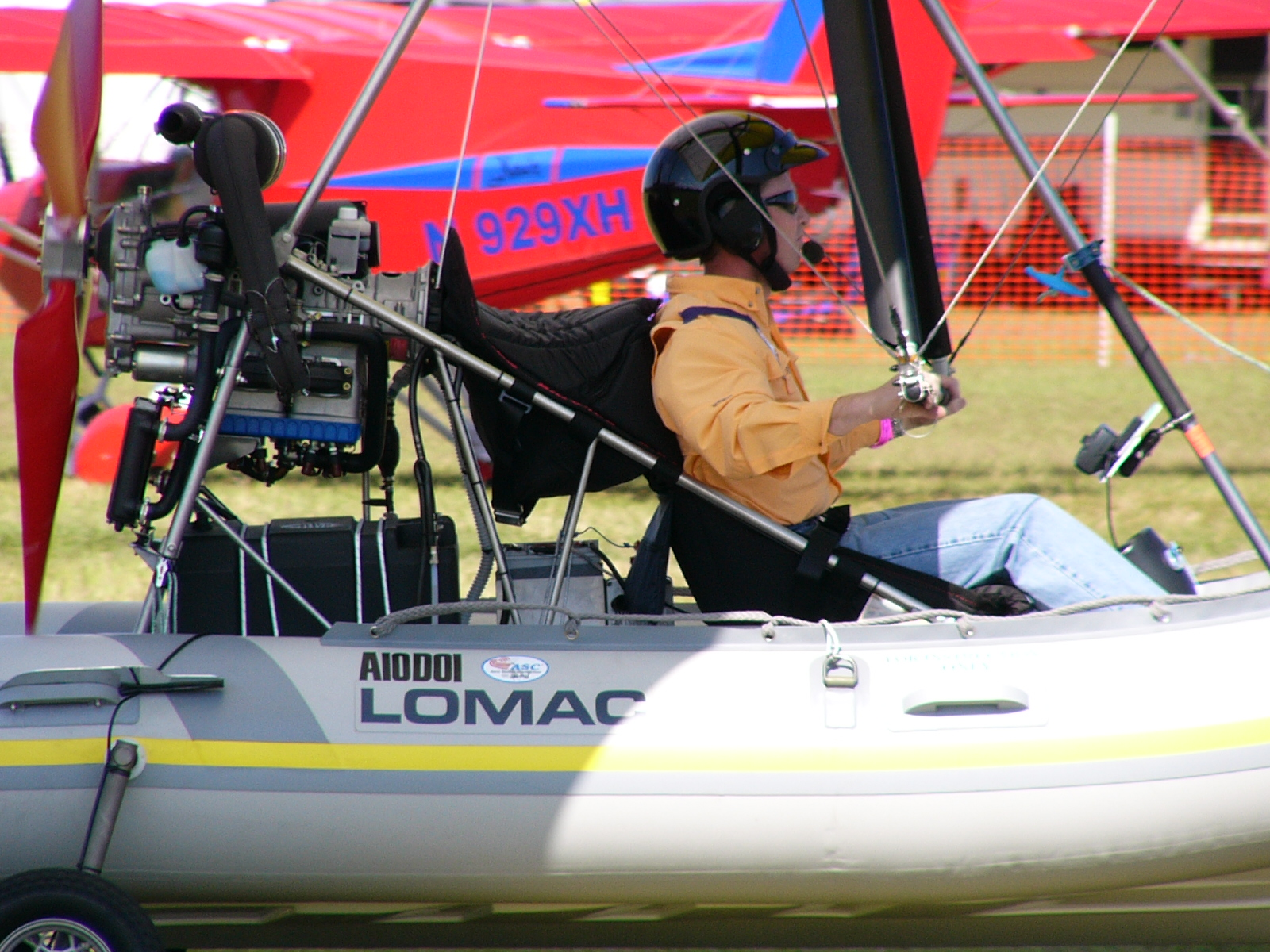
Polaris AM-FIB at Sun 'n Fun 2004

The Polaris AM-FIB ("Amphibious Flying Inflatable Boat") is an Italian amphibious flying boat ultralight trike, that was designed and produced by Polaris Motor of Gubbio. The aircraft was introduced in 2003 and was supplied as a complete ready-to-fly-aircraft.

== Design and development ==
The AM-FIB was developed from the Polaris FIB as a result of customer demand. It was designed to comply with the Fédération Aéronautique Internationale microlight category, including the category's maximum gross weight of 450 kg (992 lb). The aircraft has a maximum gross weight of 406 kg (895 lb). It features a cable-braced hang glider-style high-wing, weight-shift controls, a two-seats-in-tandem open cockpit, retractable tricycle landing gear mounted to its inflatable boat hull and a single engine in pusher configuration.

The aircraft's single surface wing is made from bolted-together aluminum tubing and covered in Dacron sailcloth. The 11.15 m (36.6 ft) span wing is supported by a single tube-type kingpost and uses an "A" frame weight-shift control bar. The powerplant is a twin cylinder, liquid-cooled, two-stroke, dual-ignition 64 hp (48 kW) Rotax 582 engine. The main landing gear is extended and retracted with a manual crank, while the nose gear uses a catch-and-rope mechanism.

The aircraft has an empty weight of 239 kg (527 lb) and a gross weight of 406 kg (895 lb), giving a useful load of 167 kg (368 lb). With full fuel of 40 litres (8.8 imp gal; 11 US gal) the payload is 138 kg (304 lb).

== Specifications (AM-FIB) ==
Data from Bayerl

General characteristics

- Crew: one
- Capacity: one passenger
- Wingspan: 11.15 m (36 ft 7 in)
- Wing area: 19.6 m^{2} (211 sq ft)
- Empty weight: 239 kg (527 lb)
- Gross weight: 406 kg (895 lb)
- Fuel capacity: 40 litres (8.8 imp gal; 11 US gal)
- Powerplant: 1 × Rotax 582 twin cylinder, liquid-cooled, two stroke aircraft engine, 48 kW (64 hp)
- Propellers: 3-bladed composite

Performance

- Maximum speed: 80 km/h (50 mph, 43 kn)
- Cruise speed: 70 km/h (43 mph, 38 kn)
- Stall speed: 48 km/h (30 mph, 26 kn)
- Rate of climb: 4.5 m/s (890 ft/min)
- Wing loading: 20.7 kg/m^{2} (4.2 lb/sq ft)
