= Polaris Motor =

Italian aircraft manufacturer

Coordinates: 43.263052°N 2.6717908°E

Polaris Motor srl
- Type: Privately held company
- Industry: Aerospace
- Founded: early 1980s
- Fate: Live
- Successor: Polaris Motor SL
- Headquarters: Gubbio, Italy
- Products: Ultralight F.I.B.s

Polaris Motor srl was an Italian aircraft manufacturer based in Gubbio. The company specialized in the design and manufacture of ultralight trikes and was known for its inflatable boat trikes.

One of the company's first products, introduced in the early 1980s, was the Skin, a conventional land trike that remained in production though 2013. The FIB ("Flying Inflatable Boat") established the company's reputation in pure flying boat form and in its AM-FIB amphibious form.

The company carried out continuous development of its boat hulled aircraft, including refining the boat hull shape over time to improve performance on the water and in the air.

By 2014 the company website was listed as "under construction" and then was taken down, and the company was out of business. It went bankrupt in 2019

== Aircraft ==
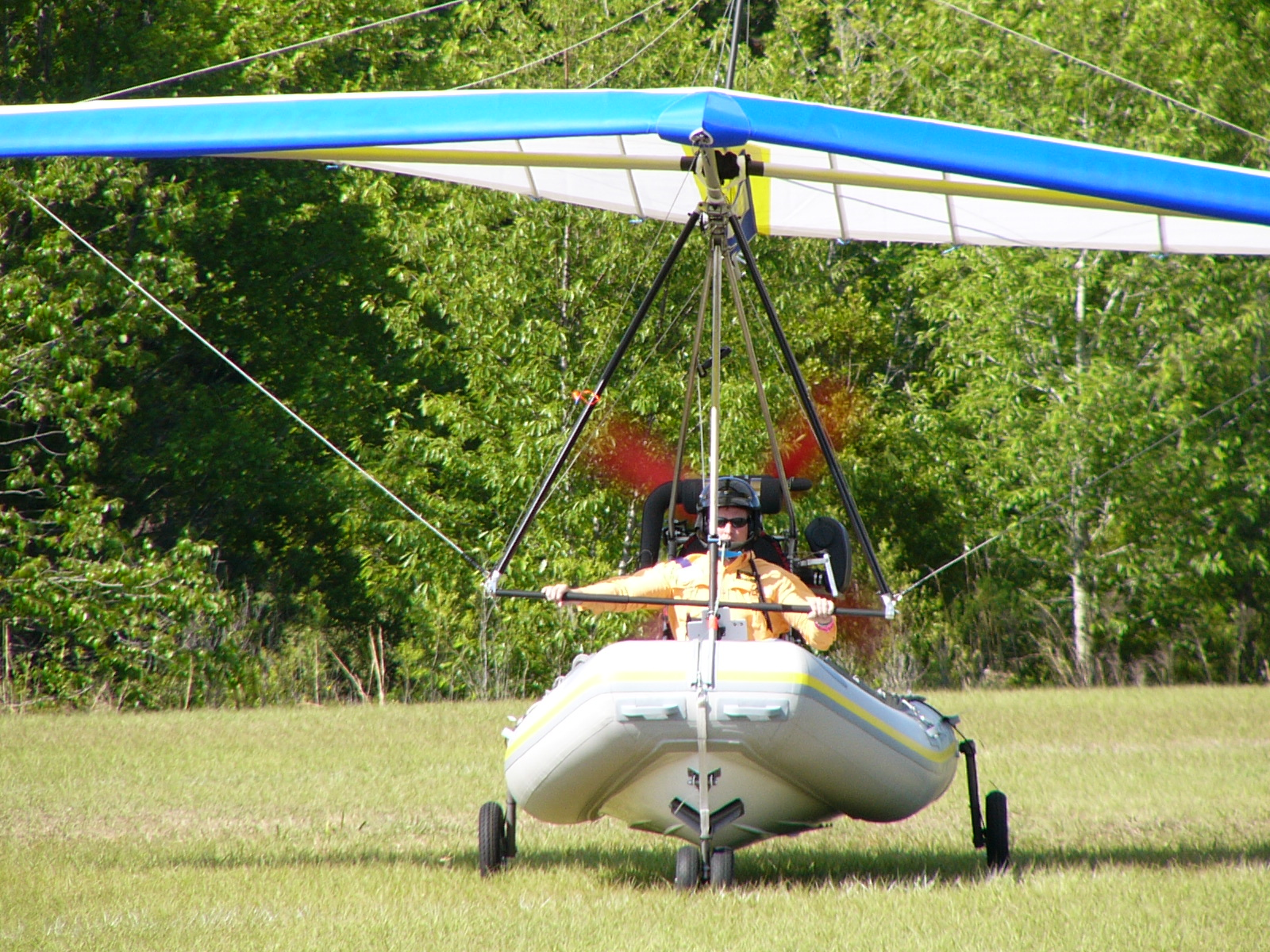
Polaris AM-FIB

Summary of aircraft built by Polaris Motor
Model name	First flight	Number built	Type
Polaris Skin	early 1980s		Ultralight trike
Polaris FIB	mid 1980s		Flying boat ultralight trike
Polaris AM-FIB	2006		Amphibious ultralight trike

== See also ==
- List of Italian companies
