= Cessna 150 =

Light, two seat, single engine airplane

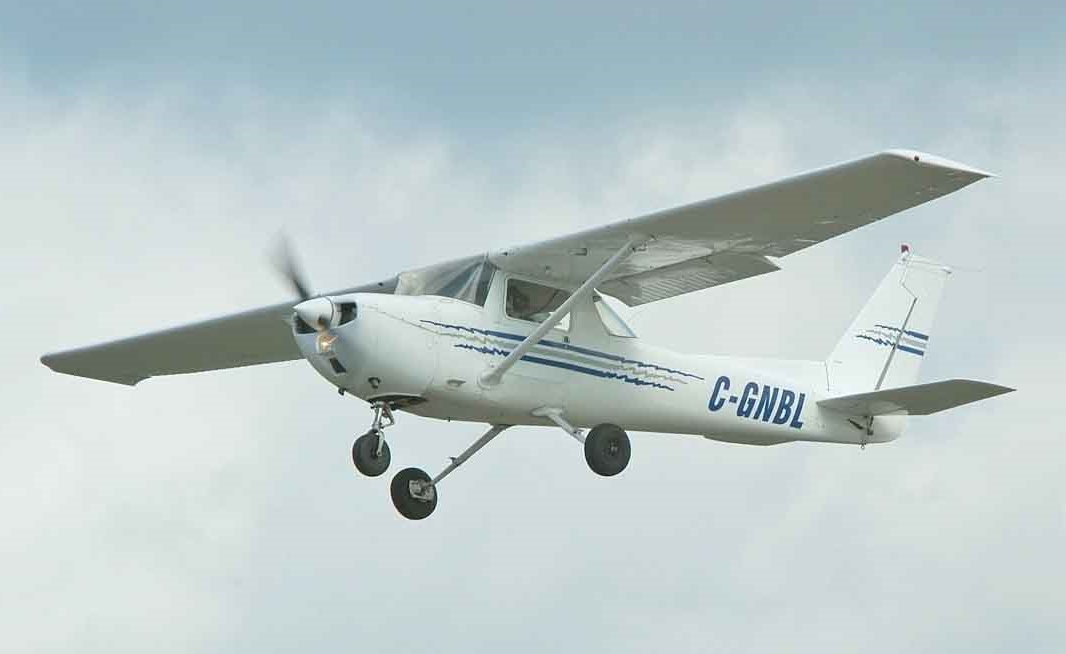
- Cessna 150M

General information
- Type: Light utility aircraft, basic trainer
- Manufacturer: Cessna
- Status: In service
- Number built: 23,839

History
- Manufactured: 1958–1977
- First flight: September 12, 1957
- Variant: Cessna 152

The Cessna 150 is a two-seat tricycle gear general aviation airplane that was designed for flight training, touring and personal use. In 1977, it was succeeded in production by the Cessna 152, a minor modification to the original design.

The Cessna 150 is the fifth most produced aircraft ever, with 23,839 produced. The Cessna 150 was offered for sale in named configurations that included the Standard basic model, the Trainer with dual controls, and the deluxe Commuter, along with special options for these known as Patroller options. Later, these configurations were joined by the top-end Commuter II and the aerobatic Aerobat models.

In 2007, Cessna announced a successor to the Model 150 and 152, the Model 162 Skycatcher.

== Development ==
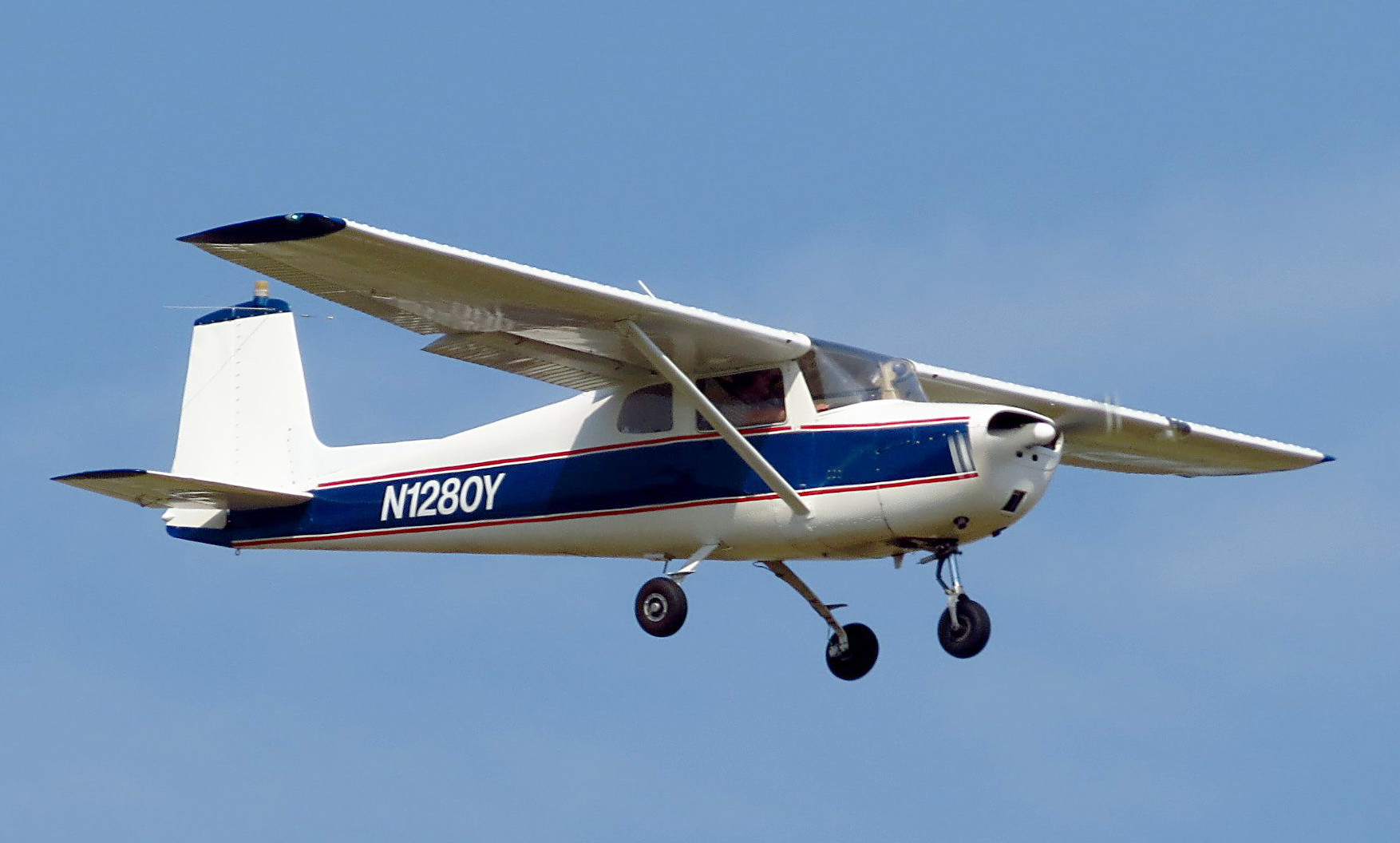
Cessna 150s produced before 1964, such as this 1962 Cessna 150B, had a straight tail and a "fastback" rear body with no rear window.

In the mid-1950s, Cessna Aircraft Company began development of a successor to the popular Cessna 140 which finished production in 1951. The resulting 142 was based on the 140, but had tricycle landing gear, which gives the aircraft more docile ground handling than the tailwheel landing gear of the 140; Cessna also replaced the rounded tips of the wings and empennage with more modern-looking, squared-off tips, and the narrow, hinged wing flaps of the 140 were replaced by larger, far more effective Fowler flaps.

The Cessna 142 prototype first flew on September 12, 1957, shortly before the aircraft was renamed to Model 150 in October. Production commenced in September 1958 at Cessna's Wichita, Kansas, plant. 1,764 aircraft were also produced by Reims Aviation under license in France. These French manufactured 150s were designated Reims F150 or Reims-Cessna F150, the "F" indicating they were built in France.

American-made 150s were all produced with the Continental O-200-A engine of 100 horsepower (75 kW). Most Reims-built aircraft are powered by a Continental O-200-A built under license by Rolls-Royce, but some have the Rolls-Royce-built version of the Continental O-240-A.

All models from 1966 onwards have larger doors and increased baggage space. With the 1967 Model 150G, the doors were bowed outwards 1.5 inches (38 mm) on each side to provide more cabin elbow room.

The 150 was succeeded in the summer of 1977 by the closely related Cessna 152. The 152 is more economical to operate due to the increased TBO (time between overhaul) of the Lycoming O-235 engine. The 152 had its flap travel limited to 30 degrees, from the 150's 40 degree flap deflection, for better climb with full flaps and the maximum certified gross weight was increased from 1,600 lb (726 kg) on the 150 to 1670 lb (757 kg) on the 152. Production of the 152 ended in 1985 when manufacturing of all Cessna piston singles was suspended.

== Production ==
A total of 22,138 Cessna 150s were built in the United States, including 21,404 Commuters and 734 Aerobats. Reims Aviation completed 1,764 F150s, of which 1,428 were Commuters and 336 were Aerobats. A Reims affiliate in Argentina also assembled 47 F150s, including 38 Commuters and 9 Aerobats.

Of all the Cessna 150/152 models, the 1966 model year was the most plentiful with 3,067 1966 Cessna 150s produced. This was the first year the aircraft featured a swept tail fin, increased baggage area and electrically operated flaps.

== Variants ==
Cessna has historically used model years like the U.S. automobile industry, with new models typically being introduced a few months prior to the actual calendar year.

142
The sole Model 142 prototype, registered N34258 (c/n 617), was built in 1957 as a tricycle landing gear development of the Cessna 140. Other changes included the addition of "Para-Lift" flaps and squared wingtips and tail surfaces. The aircraft was powered by a 100 hp (75 kW) Continental O-200-A engine, was of an all-metal construction, and had a gross weight of 1,500 lb (680 kg). First flown on September 12, 1957, the aircraft was subsequently redesignated to Model 150.

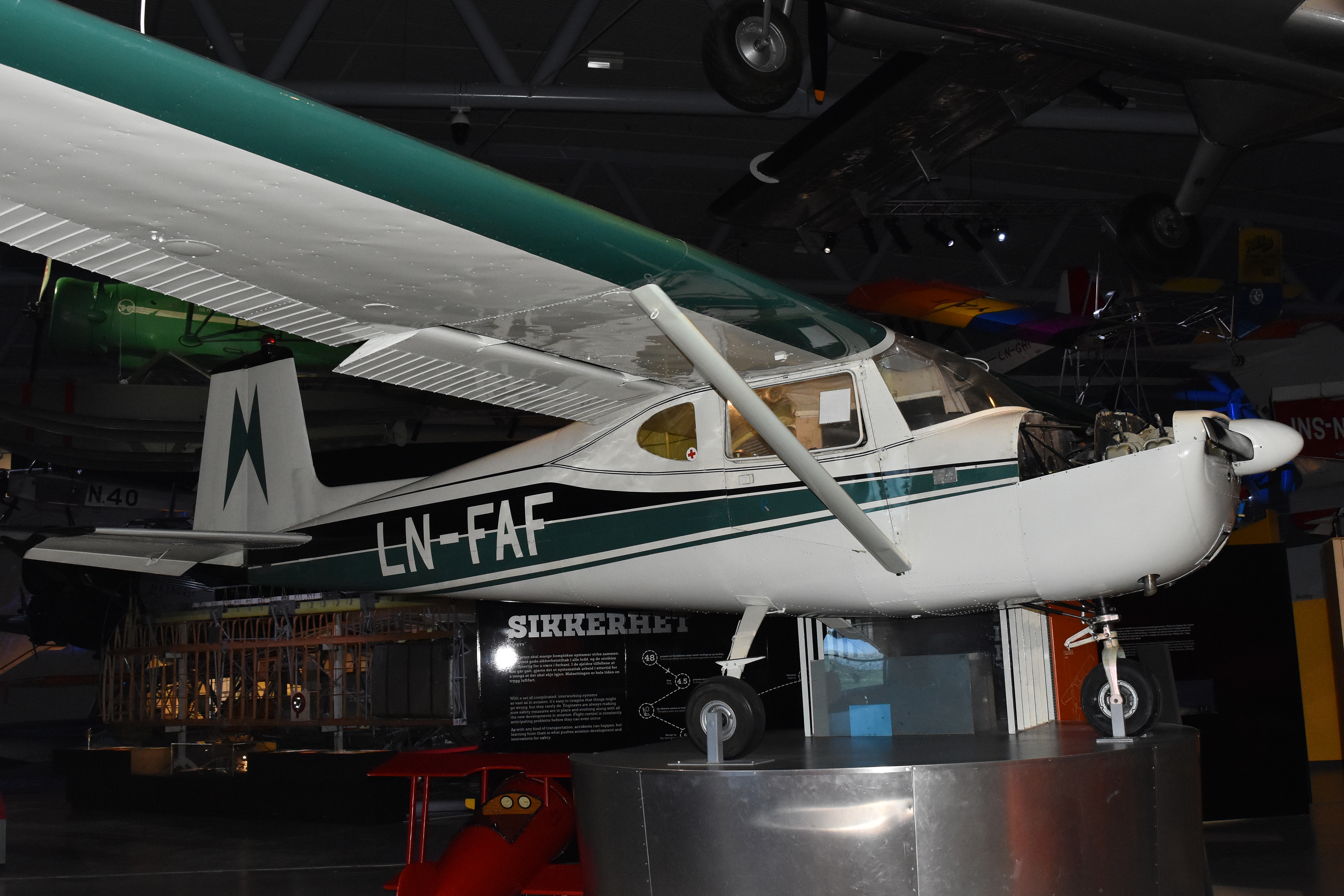
A 1959-model Cessna 150 on display in the Norwegian Aviation Museum.

150
Introduced for the 1959 model year, the production 150 was largely identical to the 142/150 prototype. The 1959 150 was offered in three configurations; the Standard, the most basic level with the fewest features; the upgraded Trainer, with dual flight controls, a more complete set of flight instruments for instrument flight rules operation, a radio, a landing light, and a few other features; and the top-of-the-line Inter-City Commuter (often called simply the Commuter), which added an engine vacuum pump, vacuum-driven heading and attitude indicators, and a revolving anti-collision beacon mounted on the vertical fin, along with all of the Trainer's features except for the dual flight controls.
For the 1960 model year, the generator in the Commuter was upgraded to 35 amperes. All 150s for 1959 had included a 20-ampere generator, and this was retained in the Standard and Trainer for 1960; the 35-ampere generator was offered as an option for these configurations. Also for 1960, the Patroller configuration was introduced for patrol-type work. These could be added, either together or selectively, to any 150 configuration, and included a "Patroller" wing with long-range fuel tanks that held a total of 38 US gal (144 L; 32 imp gal), instead of the standard 26 US gal (98 L; 22 imp gal) in the normal wing; Patroller doors, with extra acrylic glass windows in the lower half for better visibility; and a message drop tube, for dropping messages and other small items through the cabin floor to the ground.
A total of 1017 were built, not including the 1957 prototype; 683 in 1959 and 334 in 1960. (Note: Sources differ as to the exact number of each variant/model year built. This article uses the construction numbers listed in the 150's Federal Aviation Administration type certificate to determine the exact numbers built.)

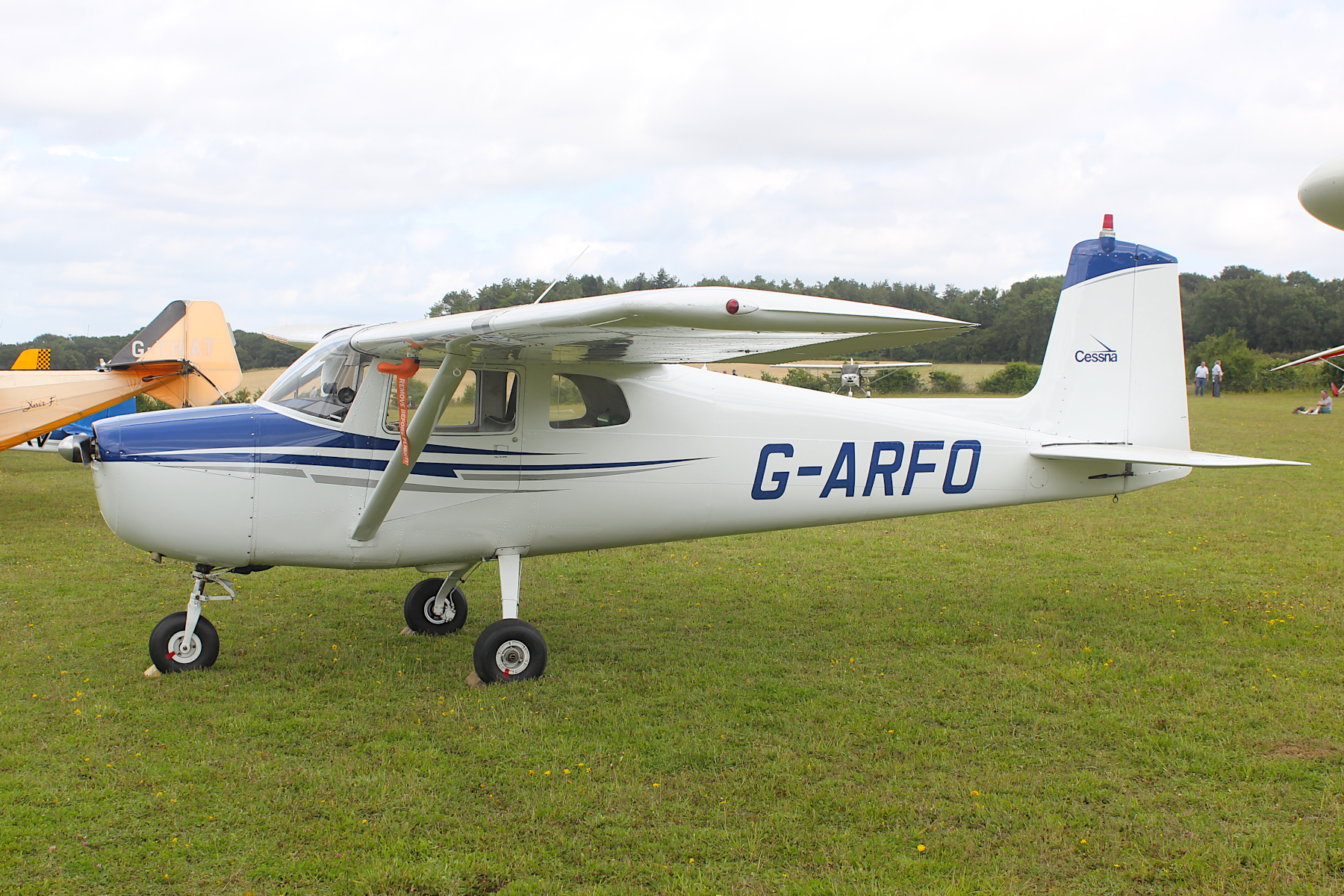
A 150A showing its metal wingtips, which are less smooth than the 150B's fiberglass wingtips.

150A
1961 model year with 15% larger rear side windows, which offered slightly better rear visibility. The landing gear was also redesigned, shifting the main wheels aft by two inches (five centimetres), but not changing the gear leg mountings. This shift of the main wheels made the aircraft less likely to tip back onto its tail during loading, and it also made the nose wheel bear more weight, which increased its steering effectiveness. Other new features in the 150A included an instrument panel with a completely redesigned layout; flush inside door handles and nearly flush window latches, which made the 150's narrow cabin a bit less cramped, and optional individually adjustable seats. 332 built.

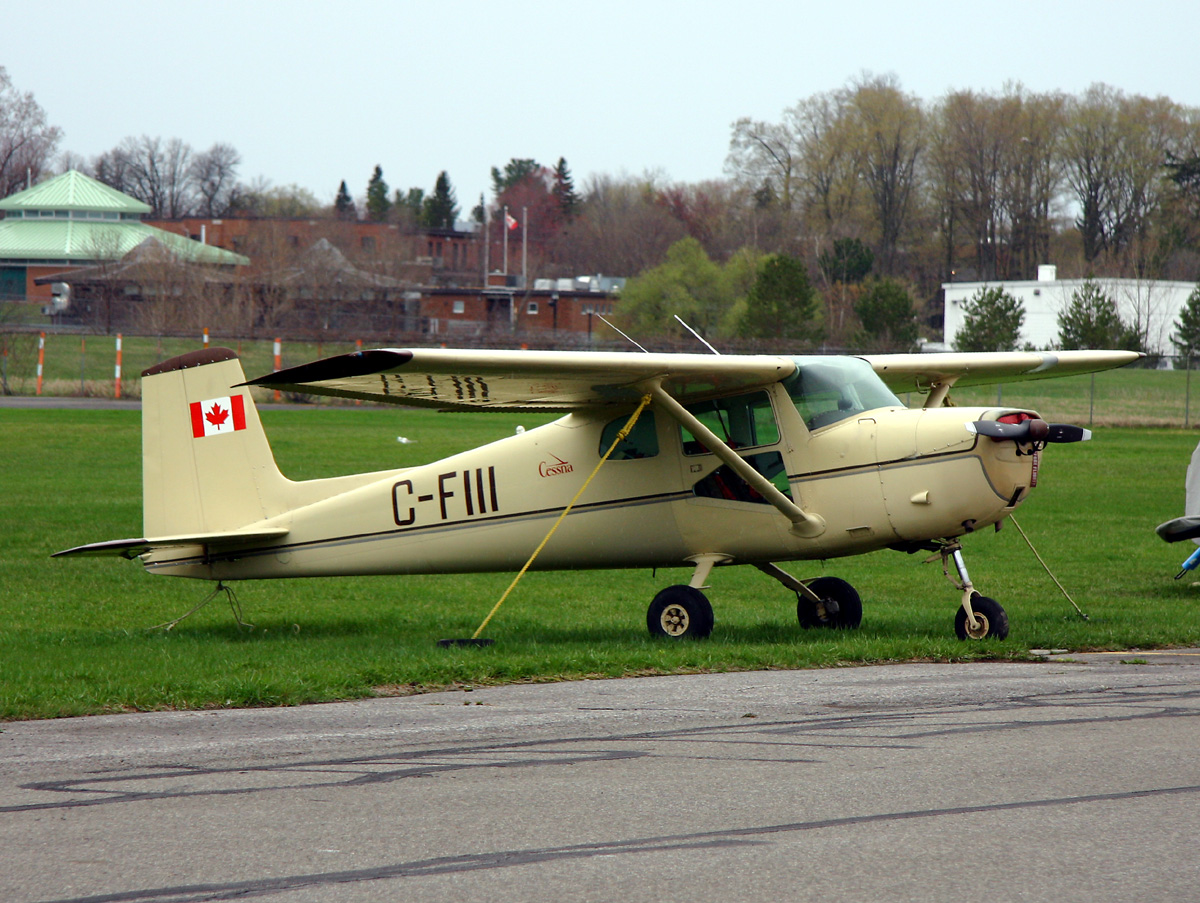
A 150B with so-called "Patroller" doors, having windows in the lower half.

150B
1962 model year with a new McCauley 1A100/MCM6950 propeller replacing the Sensenich M69CK-52 of previous versions. The new propeller had the same diameter of 69 inches (1,750 mm), but its blade pitch was reduced, which increased the maximum cruise speed by about 3 mph (5 km/h; 3 kn) and slightly improved the climb rate and service ceiling. The original metal wingtips were replaced by more smoothly contoured fiberglass ones with a different shape, increasing the wingspan by about 2 inches (50 mm). The optional two-passenger child seat for the baggage compartment, available from the first 150, was completely redesigned for the 150B. A new option was a simple autopilot, specifically for the Commuter version, called "Nav-O-Matic", a single-axis heading-hold type. Also newly offered for the 150B were optional "courtesy lights" in the underside of the wings to light the area around the doors when on the ground. The Patroller message drop tube option, on the other hand, was eliminated. 350 built.

150C
1963 model year with a quick drain added to the fuel strainer, optional larger 6.00×6 inch (150×150 mm) main wheels and tires to replace the standard 5.00×5 inch (125×125 mm) size, and an optional child seat. The optional landing gear "speed fairings" were also changed to a sharp-nosed design compatible with those used for other single-engine Cessna models. 387 built.

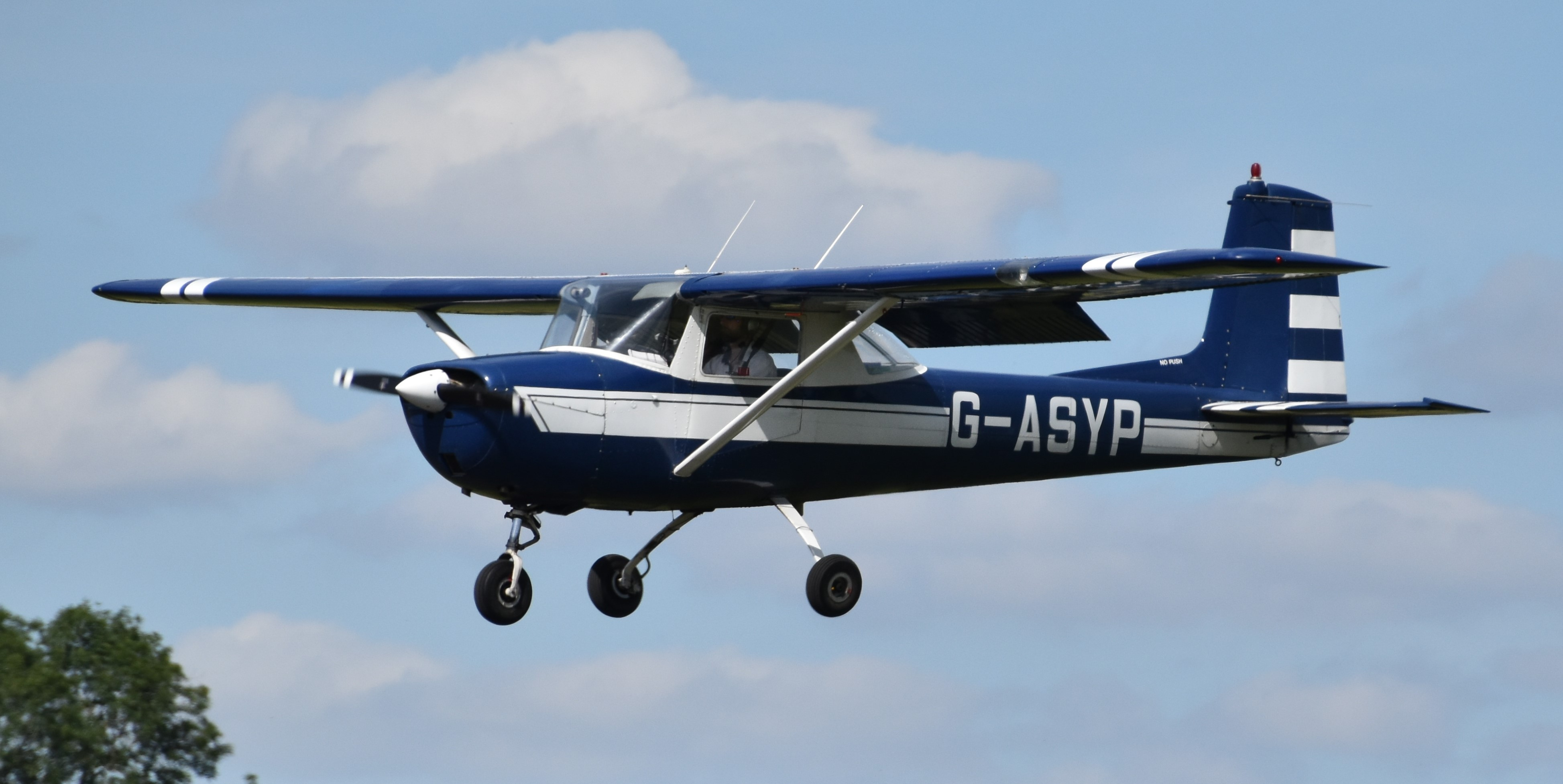
The 150D, like the very similar 150E shown here, had the new "Omni-Vision" wraparound rear window but retained the unswept tailfin of earlier 150 models.

150D
1964 model year with a cut down rear fuselage and a wraparound "Omni-Vision" rear window, following the pattern already set by other Cessna models. The new rear window improved rearward visibility, and many people found the new cabin more "airy" and pleasant, due to the increased light. Useful load was increased by 40 lb (18 kg), and the gross weight of the aircraft was correspondingly increased to 1,600 lb (730 kg), where it would stay for all later 150 models.
Because of the higher gross weight with the same engine power, Cessna's claimed performance figures for the 150D and later models are worse than for earlier models: maximum and cruise speeds are reduced, range is shortened, takeoff and landing distances are lengthened, and climb rate and service ceiling are lower. Such changes are only to be expected, because performance is weight-dependent and is normally specified at maximum gross weight. Cruise performance may also have been lessened because the new rear window made the 150D's rear fuselage less well streamlined than the former "fastback" fuselage.
The 150D retained the straight tailfin and rudder of previous years. However, to lighten control loads, aerodynamic balance horns were added to the rudder and the elevator. These horns also contained weights (mass balances) to eliminate any possible control flutter that might be induced by the changed aerodynamics of the rear fuselage.
The 150D moved the heavy electrical battery from the previous rear location, behind the baggage compartment, to the front, just ahead of the engine firewall. It had a broader range for its center of gravity than earlier models, which allowed more flexibility in loading. The 150D also had more permissive airspeed limits for its never-exceed speed, its maneuvering speed, and particularly its maximum flaps-extended speed, which was raised from 85 mph (137 km/h; 74 kn) to 100 mph (161 km/h; 87 kn).
Partway through the 150D's production, an option was added for a heavy-duty nose landing gear with a larger 6.00×6 inch (150×150 mm) nosewheel; this had a tire whose tread was wider than standard but was only slightly larger in diameter. The folding torque links on this heavy-duty nose gear were also reversed, being mounted in front of the nosewheel strut instead of behind it.
A total of 686 aircraft were built; one prototype (c/n 644) and 685 production aircraft.

150E
1965 model year with only minor changes, like the addition of an optional rear-view mirror. 760 built, plus one prototype converted from the 150D prototype (c/n 644).

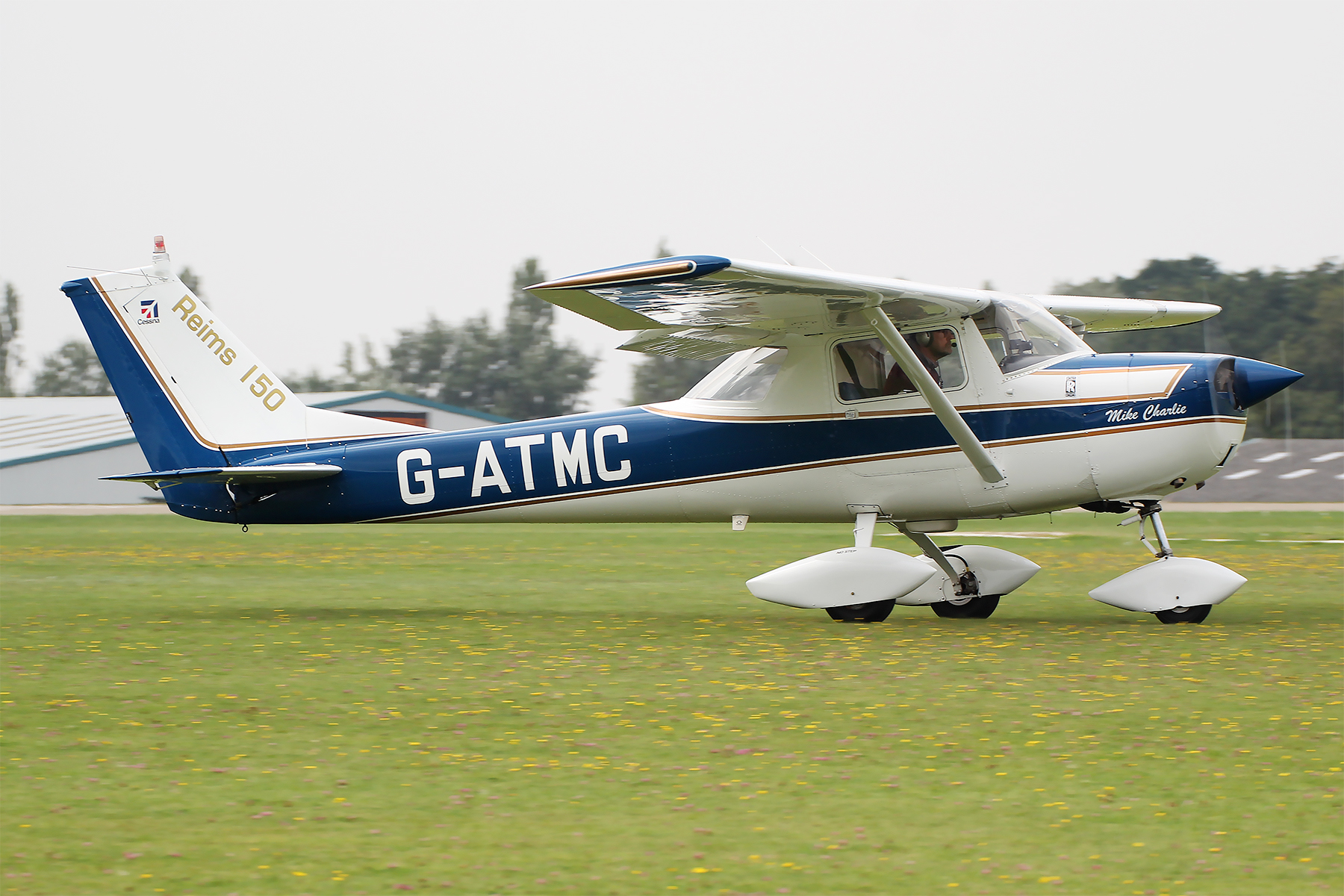
1966 Reims F150F with wheel speed fairings.

150F
1966 model year with a new vertical tail that was swept back 35 degrees, with a short dorsal strake at its base, matching the styling of the Cessna 172 and other models. The cabin doors were widened, with 23% more area, and while the old doors were tapered at the bottom, the new doors were square, making it easier to get in and out of the cabin. The new doors also had larger windows and better latches. The baggage compartment was extended aft to the bottom of the rear window, giving 50% more room, although its load limit remained at 120 lb (54 kg). The cabin floor was now flat, with no hump for routing control cables. The old manual flaps were replaced by electrically driven flaps activated by a switch on the instrument panel; other former floor controls (the elevator trim wheel and fuel shutoff valve) were now on a small vertical console beneath the panel. The electric flaps now had a flap position indicator above the left door. The 6.00×6 inch (150×150 mm) main wheels with large low-pressure tires were now standard rather than optional, and they had new brakes. The stall warning alert, previously an electric beeper, was now a pneumatic reed horn that would work even if electrical power failed. The pointed propeller spinner and rear-view mirror options became standard for the Commuter and Trainer. Other newly standard features for the Commuter were dual controls (previously restricted to the Trainer), wheel speed fairings, and an electric heater for the pitot tube and stall warning sensor. The old optional Patroller-type door (with an extra window in the lower half) was dropped along with the name "Patroller", though long-range fuel tanks were still offered. The courtesy light option was also discontinued.
Cessna greatly expanded 150 production for the 150F; a total of 3,000 of this model were produced. The 1966 model year was also the first production of French Reims-built F150s, with 67 built as the F150F.

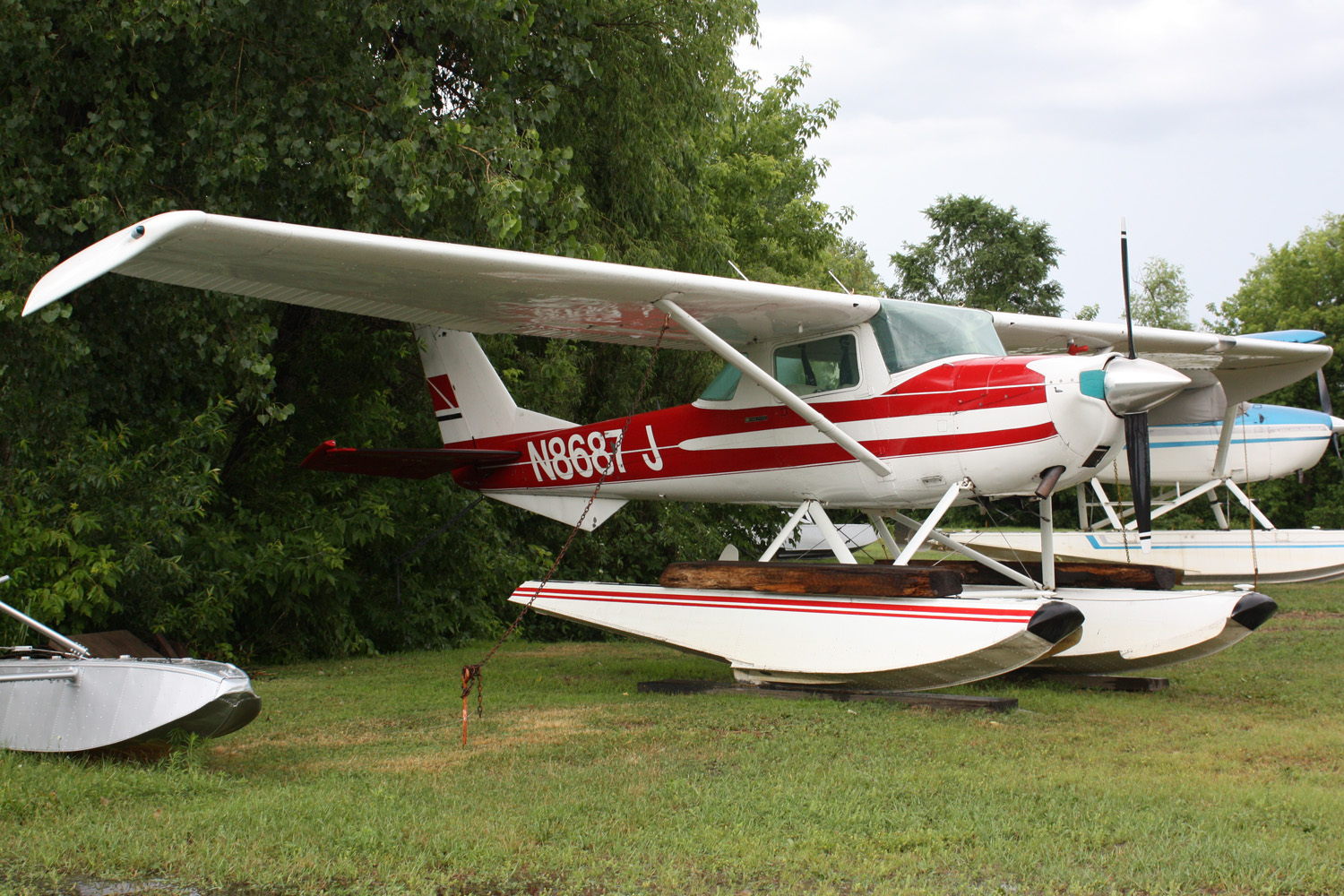
Cessna 150G on floats, with large aftermarket "drooped" wingtips.

150G
1967 model year with the doors bowed outward to make the cabin about three inches (75 mm) wider, and a lowered floor to add head room. Rubber sound isolators were added to the engine cowling to reduce vibration and noise in the cabin. The cabin heating system now allowed heated air to be mixed with fresh air and had a new windshield defroster outlet. The instrument panel's layout was changed, and the control yokes now had open tops. The stroke of the nosewheel's oleo strut was shortened from 7 inches (180 mm) to 4 inches (100 mm). Both of the old electrical generators, 20-ampere and 35-ampere, were replaced by a new 60-ampere alternator. The anti-collision beacon (standard on the Commuter, optional elsewhere) was changed from the old motorized revolving type to a new flashing type. Separately adjustable bucket seats were now standard for the Commuter and could be either fabric or vinyl-covered. The Commuter got standard wall-to-wall carpet. Tinted windows were a new option. The 150G was also the first Cessna 150 variant certified for floats. For floatplane operation it used a larger 75-inch (1,905 mm) diameter propeller and had a gross weight of 1,650 lb (750 kg).
A total of 2,666 150G models were built by Cessna; one prototype (c/n 649) and 2,655 production aircraft. Another 152 were built by Reims in France as the F150G. Unlike the F150F, which was powered by a Continental-built engine, the engines of the F150G and subsequent Reims-built F150s were license-built by Rolls-Royce.

150H
1968 model year with streamlined speed fairings at the ends of the wing struts. The electric flap switch was now a three-way switch: when pushed upward to raise flaps, it would stay in that position, making this operation "hands-off", but lowering the flaps still required holding the switch downward. The flap position indicator was now vertical, on the left front doorpost, and the center console was narrowed to improve legroom. A new wing leveler option could automatically control the ailerons and rudder to keep the aircraft on course. 2,110 were built, plus one prototype converted from the 150G prototype (c/n 649). Reims also built 170 aircraft as the F150H.

150I
The "I" model was skipped to avoid confusion with a numeral 1.

150J
1969 model year an improved instrument panel layout, which finally adopted the "basic-T" arrangement that would be used for all later 150 models. The 150J also had rocker-style electrical switches instead of the former pull-type ones, and a new key-operated combined magneto/starter-switch replaced the old "pull-style" starter. The new starter was more "car-like" but not as reliable as the old one and also more expensive to repair. New options were a map light under the control wheel and a ground power plug, and extra steps and handles were added to the floatplane version to make fueling easier. 1,820 built, plus 140 built by Reims as the F150J.

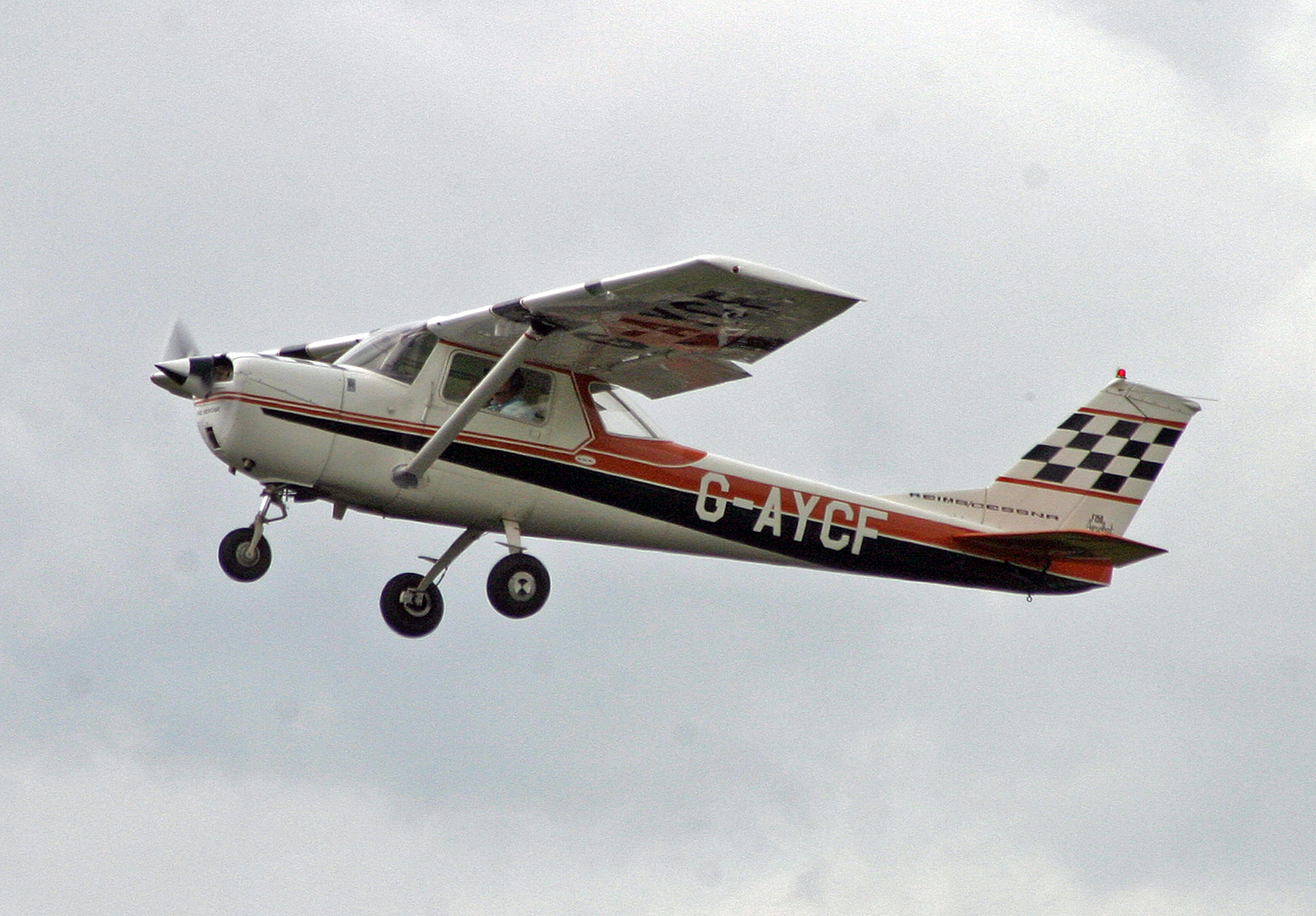
A Reims/Cessna FA150K Aerobat in Cessna's original 1970 Aerobat paint scheme.

150K/A150K
1970 model year with a split master switch that could turn off the alternator separately, a ground-adjustable rudder trim tab, a new molded cabin headliner, and new seats with greater legroom. New options included tinted dual overhead skylights for upward visibility, extra steps and handles to aid in fueling, whitewall tires, and "conically cambered" wingtips that curved downward toward the trailing edge. On the 150K Commuter, the cambered wingtips were standard.
In addition to the standard 150K, the 1970 model year introduced a version certified for aerobatics as the A150K Aerobat. The Aerobat retained the normal 150's 100 hp (75 kW) Continental O-200 engine, but structurally it was stronger than the normal 150K, being rated for load factors of +6.0/−3.0 g (vs. +4.4/–1.76 g for the normal 150K) and having higher limits for its maneuvering and never-exceed speeds. Other Aerobat standard features included the dual skylights already mentioned, shoulder harnesses for both occupants, removable seat backs and cushions to make room for a back-pack or seat-pack parachute, jettisonable doors, and a special checkerboard paint scheme; there was also an optional accelerometer for the instrument panel. The Aerobat was approved for a variety of maneuvers that were not permitted for normal 150s, but it still had the normal 150's gravity-fed fuel system, so sustained inverted flight was not possible. A 1970 A150K Aerobat cost $12,000 as opposed to the $11,450 price for a 150K Commuter model.
A total of 1101 were built; 875 as the 150K and 226 as the A150K. Reims also built a total of 210 aircraft; 129 as the F150K and 81 as the FA150K Aerobat.

150L/A150L
Introduced for the 1971 model year with tubular landing gear legs replacing the previous flat steel leaf spring gear. Also in 1971, the landing and taxi lights were moved from the wing leading edge to the nose bowl to better illuminate the ground. The 150L also introduced a longer dorsal strake that reached to the rear window. The 1972 model year the received new fuel filler caps to reduce moisture seepage, and better seats and seat tracks. 1973 brought in lower seats to provide more headroom for taller pilots. 1974 introduced a new propeller with a Clark Y airfoil on the A150L Aerobat, which increased cruise by 4 mph (6.4 km/h).
In 1972, Reims introduced the FRA150L Aerobat, which was powered by a 130 hp (97 kW) Rolls-Royce O-240-A engine; the first engine change for the 150 type since production began. The FRA150L was produced alongside the O-200-powered F150L and FA150L Aerobat, and could be converted to FA150L standard with an FKA150-2311 or FKA150-2316 kit.
Cessna built a total of 4,074 aircraft; 625 (1971 150L), 50 (1971 A150L), 1,030 (1972 150L), 66 (1972 A150L), 1,192 (1973 150L), 87 (1973 A150L), 931 (1974 150L), and 93 (1974 A150L). Reims built a total of 665 aircraft; 485 (F150L), 39 (FA150L), and 141 (FRA150L). DINFIA also produced a total of 48 150L/A150Ls in Argentina as the A-150L and A-A150L; 39 (A-150L), 6 (1972 A-A150L), and 3 (1973 A-A150L).

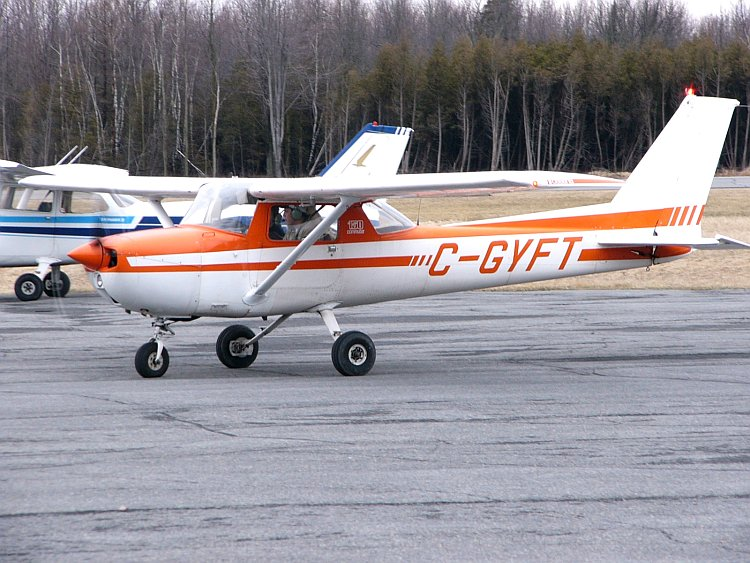
1976 model Cessna 150M showing its 15% larger tail and rudder area

150M/A150M
Introduced for the 1975 model year, the 150M was the final Cessna 150 model before the type was replaced by the 152. The primary change was a redesigned vertical tail that was taller, narrower, and had an overall larger area. Inertia-reel restraints were also offered as an option. The 150M introduced the Commuter II upgrade package that included many optional avionics and trim items as standard. The 1976 model year introduced redesigned wheel fairings, a suite of electrical circuit breakers to replace the previous fuses, and a fully articulated pilot seat as standard equipment (this seat had been optional on some earlier models).
The 1977 model year was the last for the Cessna 150. It added only "pre-select" flaps, allowing the pilot to set the flaps to any position without the pilot having to hold the switch during flap travel, enabling the pilot to concentrate on other flying duties. Only 427 1977 model 150Ms were built as production shifted to the improved Cessna 152 in the early part of 1977.
The many refinements incorporated into the 150 over the years had cost the aircraft a lot of useful load. The very first 150 weighed 962 lb (436 kg) empty, whereas the last Commuter II had an empty weight of 1,129 lb (512 kg). This increase in empty weight of 167 lb (76 kg) was offset only by a gross weight increase of 100 lb (45 kg) in 1964. The 152 would bring a much-needed 70 lb (32 kg) increase in gross weight to 1,670 lb (760 kg).
A total of 3,836 aircraft were built; 1,224 (1975 150M), 87 (1975 A150M), 1,500 (1976 150M), 75 (1976 A150M), 900 (1977 150M), and 50 (1977 A150M). Reims built a total of 360 aircraft as the F150M, FA150M, and FRA150M; 285 (F150M) and 75 (FA150M/FRA150M).

T-51A
Designation of a single 150L and two 150M aircraft used by the United States Air Force Academy Flying Team.

B.Ph.1
(Thai: บ.พ.๑) Royal Thai Armed Forces designation for the 150H.

== Modifications available ==
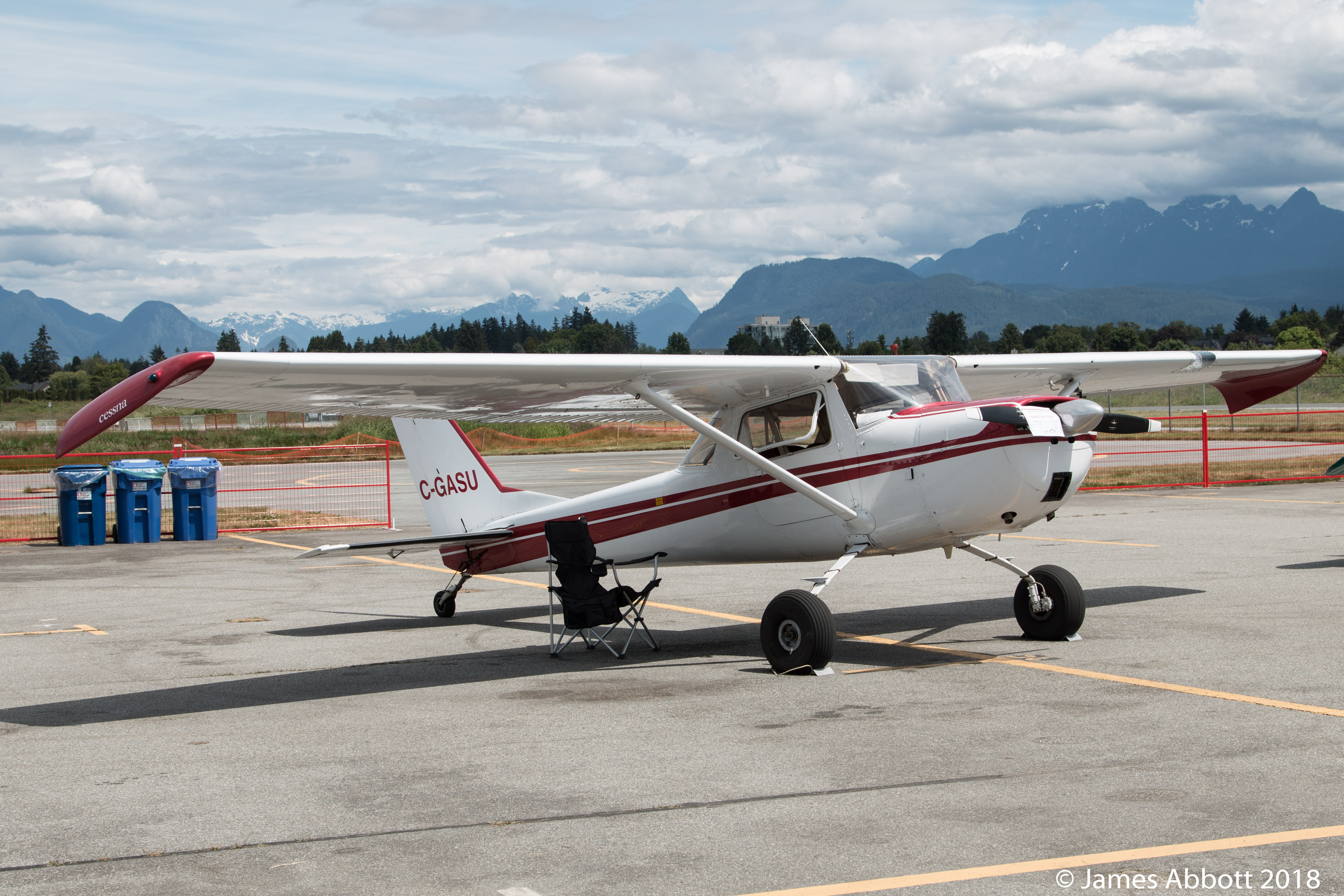
A number of Cessna 150s have been converted to taildragger configuration using STC kits.

There are hundreds of modifications available for the Cessna 150. Some of the most frequently installed include:

- Vortex generators and STOL kits that reduce the stall speed of the plane.
- Flap gap seals to reduce drag and increase rate of climb.
- Different wing tips, some of which claim various cruise speed increases and stall speed reductions.
- Auto fuel STCs, which permit the use of automobile fuel instead of the more expensive aviation fuel.
- Larger engines, up to 180 horsepower (130 kW).
- Taildragger landing gear.
- Auxiliary fuel tanks for larger capacity.
- Door catches to replace the factory ones that often fail in service.
- Belly fuel drain valves to drain fuel from the lowest point in the fuel system.

The Aviat 150 is an overhauled and rebuilt Cessna 150 by Aviat.

== Noteworthy flights ==
- On September 12, 1994, Frank Eugene Corder intentionally crashed a Cessna 150L onto the South Lawn of the White House against the south wall of the Executive Mansion, in an apparent suicide. Corder was killed, but no one else was injured and damage to property on the ground was minimal.
- In 1996, a Cessna 150 was flown from the United States to South Africa in several stages, crossing the Atlantic along the way. An extra 60 gallon fuel tank was installed (beyond the standard 22.5 gallons) and the plane took off 500 lb (230 kg) over gross weight.

== Operators ==
=== Civil ===
The aircraft is popular with flying schools as well as private individuals.

=== Military ===
Burundi

- Burundi Air Force

Democratic Republic of the Congo

- Congo Democratic Air Force

Ecuador

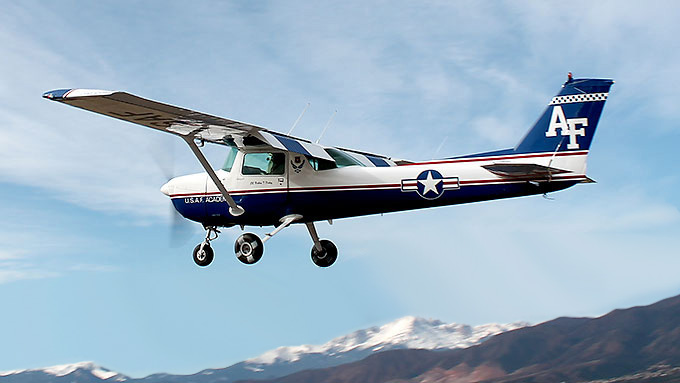
T-51A (Cessna 150L) of the United States Air Force Academy

- Ecuadorian Air Force

Haiti

- Haitian Air Corps

Ivory Coast

- Ivory Coast Air Force

Liberia

- Liberian Army

Mexico

- Mexican Naval Aviation

Paraguay

- Paraguayan Naval Aviation

Somalia

- Somali Air Force

Sri Lanka

- Sri Lanka Air Force

United States

- United States Air Force Academy

== Notable accidents ==
- 27 March 1968: Ozark Air Lines Flight 965, a Douglas DC-9-15, collided with a 150F, aircraft registration N8669G, approximately 1.5 miles (2.4 km) north of Lambert–St. Louis Municipal Airport (Lambert Field), St. Louis, Missouri, while both aircraft were approaching runway 17. The Cessna was destroyed and both of its occupants were killed. The DC-9 sustained light damage and was able to land safely; none of its 44 passengers or five crewmembers were injured. The accident was attributed to inadequate visual flight rules (VFR) procedures at the airport, the failure of the DC-9 pilots to notice the Cessna, and poor communications between air traffic control and the Cessna pilots. (Note: "Midair collision, Ozark Air Lines, Inc., DC-9, N970Z And Interstate Airmotive, Inc., Cessna 150F, N8669G, St. Louis, Missouri, March 27, 1968" (PDF). fss.aero. June 30, 1969.)
- 4 August 1968: Cessna 150F N8742S collided with North Central Airlines Flight 261, a Convair CV-580, 11.5 miles (19 km) southwest of General Mitchell Airport in Milwaukee, Wisconsin, at 2,700 feet (820 m), as the northbound Convair was on approach to runway 7R. The cabin section of the Cessna became embedded in the Convair's forward baggage compartment. The Convair lost electrical power and its right engine was shut down due to a damaged propeller; the captain completed a successful emergency landing six minutes later. All three occupants aboard the Cessna (Note: The third occupant was a twelve-year-old boy riding in the optional rear seat for the Cessna's baggage compartment. Since the Cessna was found to be properly loaded, his weight was presumably within the 120 lb (54 kg) allowed for the 150F's rear compartment.) were killed and the first officer on the Convair was seriously injured, but the other three crew and eight passengers were uninjured. The accident was attributed to the inability of the Convair 580 flight crew to see the Cessna in sufficient time to take evasive action, despite having been provided with three radar traffic advisories. Contributing factors were heavy insect smears on the Convair's cockpit windows, haze, smoke and sun glare, and the Cessna's inconspicuous color and its lack of relative motion as the two aircraft converged.
- 9 January 1971: 150J N60942 collided with American Airlines Flight 30, a Boeing 707-323C, at about 2,975 feet (907 m) Edison, New Jersey, while the 707 was on approach to Newark Airport. The Cessna ran head-on into the 707's outer left wing and went out of control due to impact damage, crashing and killing both its occupants. The 707, although itself damaged, landed safely in Newark; there were no injuries among its 14 passengers and 7 crew. The National Transportation Safety Board (NTSB) found the cause to be "the inability of the crews of both aircraft to see and avoid each other while operating in a system which permits VFR aircraft to operate up to 3,000 feet on random headings and altitudes in a congested area under conditions of reduced visibility."
- 4 August 1971: 150J N61011 collided with Continental Air Lines Flight 712, a Boeing 707-324C, at about 3,950 feet (1,200 m) over Compton, California, while the 707 was making a nighttime approach into Los Angeles International Airport (LAX). The 150 hit the 707's outer right wing and was severely damaged, but the instructor pilot retained enough control to make a successful forced landing near a lighted golf course; although the Cessna was destroyed, its pilots both survived with injuries. The 707's outer right wing was damaged, but the aircraft landed safely at LAX, and none of its 87 passengers and 9 crew were injured. According to the NTSB, the cause was "the minimum opportunity for the flightcrews [sic] to see and avoid the other aircraft due to the background lights behind the Cessna and the decrease in the Cessna pilots' visual field resulting from the aircraft's wing while turning".
- 9 January 1975: 150H N50430 collided with a United States Air Force Convair VT-29D at night over the James River off Newport News, Virginia, while the Convair was on an instrument landing system approach to Langley Air Force Base. The collision killed all aboard both aircraft: the Cessna's pilot and passenger and the Convair's five crew and two passengers. The NTSB found the probable cause to be "the human limitation inherent in the see-and-avoid concept, which can be critical in a terminal area with a combination of controlled and uncontrolled traffic", and recommended stricter traffic control procedures for the high-traffic area around Newport News and Langley.
- 9 January 1975: Golden West Airlines Flight 261, a de Havilland Canada DHC-6 Twin Otter, collided with 150 N11421 at Whittier, California, while on approach to LAX, killing all 14 people on both planes.
- 7 July 2015: 150M N3601V was involved in a mid-air collision with a General Dynamics F-16CJ Fighting Falcon over Moncks Corner, South Carolina. Both occupants of the Cessna were killed; the pilot of the F-16 ejected safely.

== Specifications (1976 150M Commuter II) ==
3-view line drawing of the Cessna 150

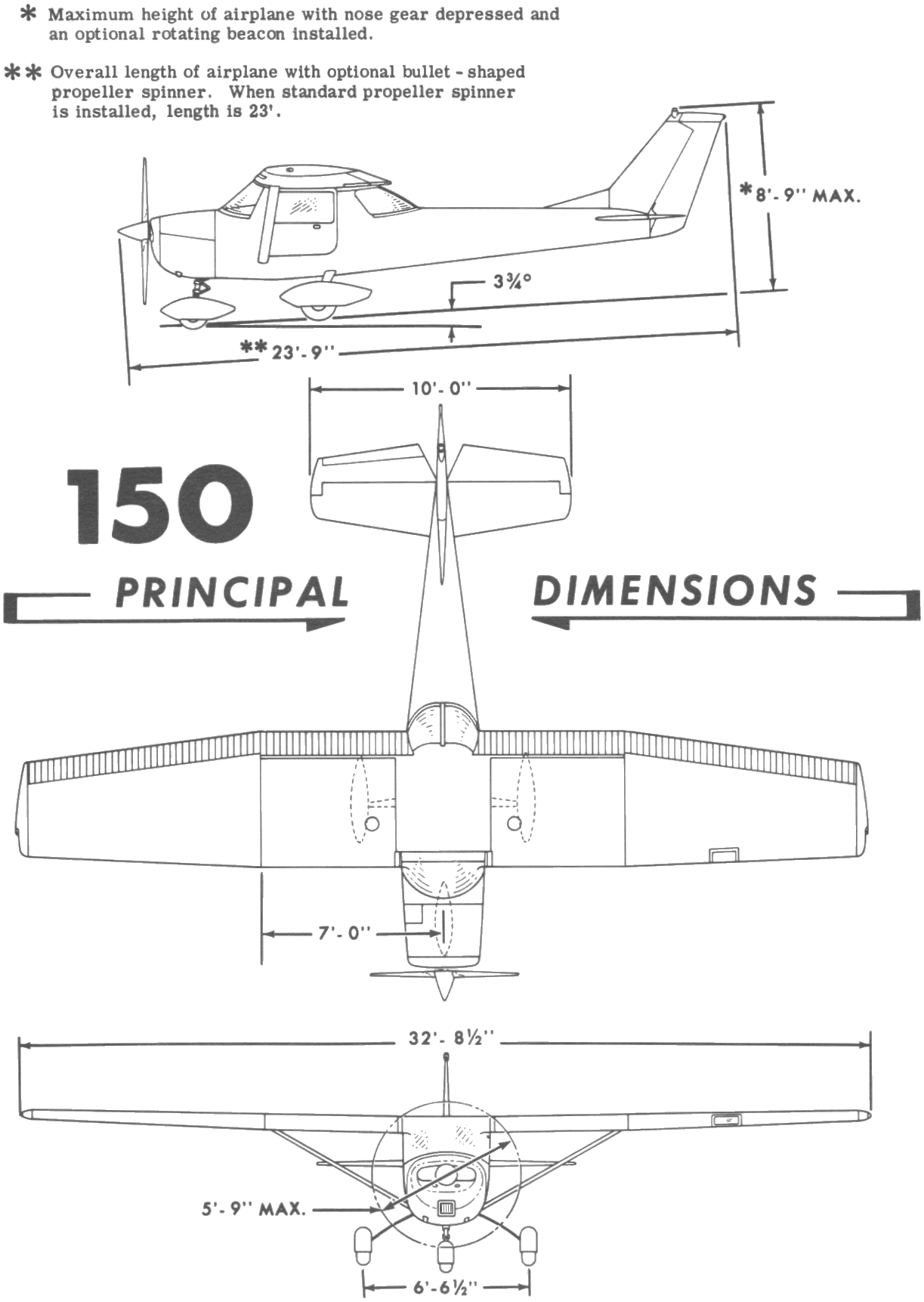
3-view line drawing of the Cessna 150F

Data from Jane's All The World's Aircraft

General characteristics

- Crew: one
- Capacity: one passenger (plus two children not exceeding 120 lb (54 kg) on optional bench seat in baggage space)
- Length: 23 ft 11 in (7.29 m)
- Wingspan: 33 ft 2 in (10.11 m)
- Height: 8 ft 6 in (2.59 m)
- Wing area: 160 sq ft (15 m^{2})
- Aspect ratio: 6.7:1
- Airfoil: NACA 2412
- Empty weight: 1,122 lb (509 kg)
- Max takeoff weight: 1,600 lb (726 kg)
- Fuel capacity: 22.5 US gal (18.7 imp gal; 85 L) usable internal fuel
- Powerplant: 1 × Continental O-200-A air-cooled horizontally-opposed engine, 100 hp (75 kW)
- Propellers: 2-bladed McCauley 1A102/OCM metal fixed-pitch propeller, 5 ft 9 in (1.75 m) diameter

Performance

- Maximum speed: 109 kn (125 mph, 202 km/h) at sea level
- Cruise speed: 82 kn (94 mph, 152 km/h) at 10,000 ft (3,050 m) (econ cruise)
- Stall speed: 42 kn (48 mph, 78 km/h) (flaps down, power off)
- Never exceed speed: 140 kn (160 mph, 260 km/h)
- Range: 420 nmi (480 mi, 780 km) (econ cruise, standard fuel)
- Service ceiling: 14,000 ft (4,300 m)
- Rate of climb: 670 ft/min (3.4 m/s)
- Take-off run to 50 ft (15 m): 1,385 ft (422 m)
- Landing run from 50 ft (15 m): 1,075 ft (328 m)

== See also ==
- 1957 in aviation (first flight)

Related development

- Cessna 140
- Cessna 152
- Cessna 172

Aircraft of comparable role, configuration, and era

- Alpha 2000 (Robin R2000)
- Beechcraft Skipper
- Diamond DA20
- Grumman American AA-1
- Liberty XL2
- Macchi M.B.308
- Piper Tomahawk
- Symphony SA-160

Related lists

- List of aircraft
- List of civil aircraft
- List of most produced aircraft
