= Liberty XL2 =

General aviation aircraft

XL2
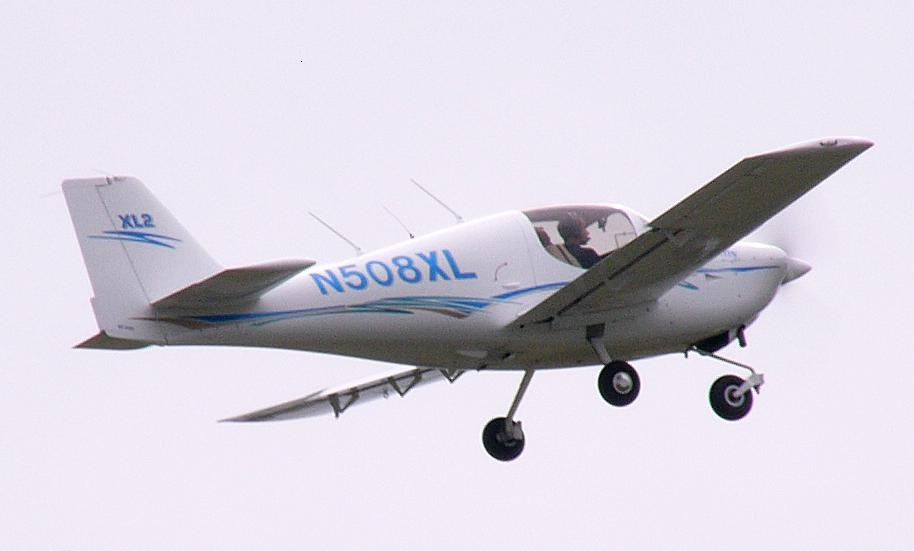

General information
- Type: Personal use and training aircraft
- National origin: United States
- Manufacturer: Liberty Aerospace; Discovery Aviation
- Designer: Ivan Shaw
- Status: In limited production (2018)
- Number built: 132 (October 2012)

History
- Manufactured: 2004–2011, 2018
- Developed from: Europa XS

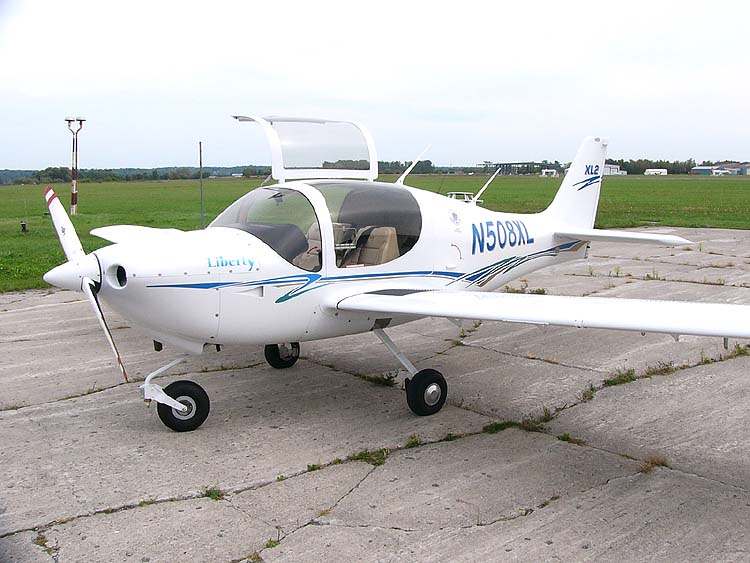
Liberty XL2

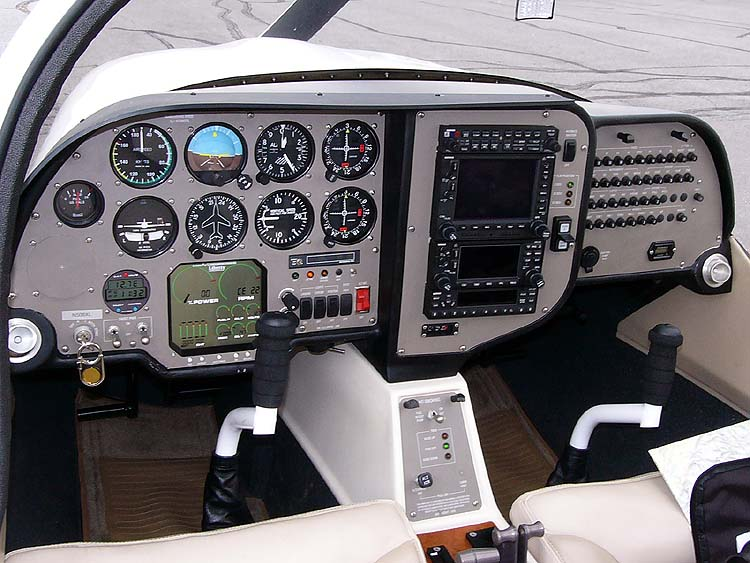
Liberty XL2 instrument panel

The Liberty XL2 is a two-seat, low-wing, general aviation aircraft manufactured from 2004–2011 by Liberty Aerospace of Melbourne, Florida, United States. A derivative of the Europa XS kit plane, it serves both as a touring aircraft for private flyers and as a flight trainer.

Subsequently, Discovery Aviation acquired the rights and in 2018 production of the aircraft (now named as the Discovery XL-2) resumed at the same Florida factory.

On 25 September 2024, the TCDS was transferred back to Liberty Aerospace, now based in Greenville, South Carolina.

== Design and development ==
Derived from the Europa XS kitplane and motor-glider, the XL-2 was type certified in 2004 under FAR Part 23 for VFR and IFR flight.

Compared to the Europa XS, the fuselage is slightly wider and larger to accommodate bigger American pilots, and also taller with a bigger windscreen. The wing is metal instead of composite and the aircraft is equipped with a Teledyne Continental Motors FADEC-controlled engine mounted on a metal space frame instead of the Europa's Rotax 912 engine mounted on the fiberglass fuselage. The landing gear is also of a different design.

The Liberty was designed by Ivan Shaw, who also created the Europa. The aircraft has a composite fuselage and aluminum wings. The engine is a fuel injected FADEC (Full Authority Digital Engine Control) equipped Continental IOF-240–B driving an MT composite propeller.

The landing gear is of tricycle configuration and all three sprung gear legs are made from 4130 chrome-molybdenum steel alloy. The nose wheel is free-castering. On early versions the nose wheel steering was by differential braking via two finger-controlled brake handles mounted on the centre console. On later versions more conventional toe brakes were installed.

The wing features large fowler flaps pivoting on three scissor hinges per wing, with a maximum 30-degree deflection. The flaps are electrically powered and are controlled by a switch to the right of the radio stack. The flap indicator is a three-light system which shows when the flaps are at zero, twenty and thirty degrees. The flaps can be selected in between those settings but require visual confirmation of flap position. The wing is rectangular with a 7:1 aspect ratio, no taper and no washout. Small stall strips are installed a few feet out from the root to aid stall performance. The airfoil is a unique design, which the XL2 shares with its predecessor the Europa. This is a Don Dykins airfoil, designated as a "Dykins 12%", because the wing's maximum thickness is 12% of the chord. The airfoil is a semi-symmetrical, laminar-flow design. The stall warning system is a voice annunciator that says "stall, stall".

The fuel is housed in a single fuselage-mounted tank with filler on the left side. The tank holds 28 US gallons usable and is fed to the engine via a simple on-off fuel selector.

The tail features a rudder mounted with a piano hinge on the right side only. The elevator is a full flying stabilator and incorporates anti-servo tabs inboard on both sides to increase pitch stick forces. The controls are actuated by dual control sticks and conventional rudder pedals.

Cockpit access is via two "gull wing" doors. The seats are mounted in side-by-side configuration in a 48-inch-wide (1,200 mm) cockpit. The seats are fixed in place with ergonomic adjustment achieved with seat cushions of different thicknesses and adjustable rudder pedals.

Standard avionics include a Garmin 530 GPS-Comm, a 430 GPS-Comm and a GTX 327 transponder, along with an intercom system and audio control panel. Engine instruments are all contained within a Vision MicroSystems VM-1000 panel.

Under the right side of the instrument panel is an ITT Cannon D-subminiature plug providing RS-232 serial communication, into which a computer can be plugged to download engine monitoring information. The software to run this is included on a CD-ROM that comes with the plane. This has been upgraded to an EDI card (engine Data Information). This card is a memory card much like in a digital camera, and records all engine data from 0 hours, until the 2000 hour TBO and can be read with a card reader to diagnose problems and observe flight characteristics in real time.

In July 2009 the company introduced a version of the XL2 equipped with a Wilksch Airmotive turbocharged diesel power plant that burns Jet-A fuel aimed at the non-North American market. Liberty was to assist Wilksch in certifying this engine.

In April 2011 the company announced that they had developed a 100 hp (75 kW) Rotax 912S powered version that runs on auto fuel aimed at Asian markets, due to lack of 100 octane avgas fuel outside North America. The engine will be available as a factory option and also as a retrofit under a supplemental type certificate and saves 150 lb (68 kg) in empty weight, due to the much lighter engine.

With the start of the 2008 global recession, sales of the XL2 slowed greatly. During 2011 the company shipped only two aircraft and none during the first two quarters of 2012. In late September 2012 the sale of 50 XL2s to the city of Wuhan, China was announced. In October 2012 the Chinese order was increased to 200 aircraft, with components being shipped to Wuhan for final assembly.

Discovery Aviation purchased the rights to the design in 2014, putting it back into limited production with avionics upgrades in January 2018 under the name Discovery XL-2. The company reported orders for three aircraft for a South Korean operator at that time. Discovery planned to increase production to full capacity by the end of 2018.

== Specifications (Liberty XL2) ==
Data from Liberty Aerospace Web site, the maintenance manual, The Incomplete Guide to Airfoil Usage and Plane & Pilot Magazine

General characteristics

- Crew: one
- Capacity: one passenger
- Length: 20 ft 3.8 in (6.193 m)
- Wingspan: 28 ft 7.26 in (8.7188 m)
- Height: 7 ft 4.96 in (2.2596 m)
- Wing area: 112.0 sq ft (10.41 m^{2})
- Airfoil: Dykins 12%
- Empty weight: 1,160 lb (526 kg)
- Gross weight: 1,750 lb (794 kg)
- Powerplant: 1 × Continental IOF-240-B four cylinder horizontally opposed four-stroke aircraft engine with FADEC control, 125 hp (93 kW)

Performance

- Cruise speed: 125 kn (144 mph, 232 km/h)
- Stall speed: 44 kn (51 mph, 81 km/h) flaps down
- Never exceed speed: 162 kn (186 mph, 300 km/h)
- Range: 500 nmi (580 mi, 930 km)
- Service ceiling: 12,500 ft (3,800 m)
- Rate of climb: 682 ft/min (3.46 m/s)
- Wing loading: 14.76 lb/sq ft (72.1 kg/m^{2})

== See also ==
Related development

- Europa XS

Aircraft of comparable role, configuration, and era

- Alpha 2000 (Robin R2000)
- Beechcraft Skipper
- Cessna 152
- Diamond DA20
- Grumman American AA-1
- Piper PA-38 Tomahawk
- Symphony SA-160
- Van's Aircraft RV-6
- Van's Aircraft RV-7
- Van's Aircraft RV-9

Related lists

- List of civil aircraft
