= Roko Aero NG4 =

NG4
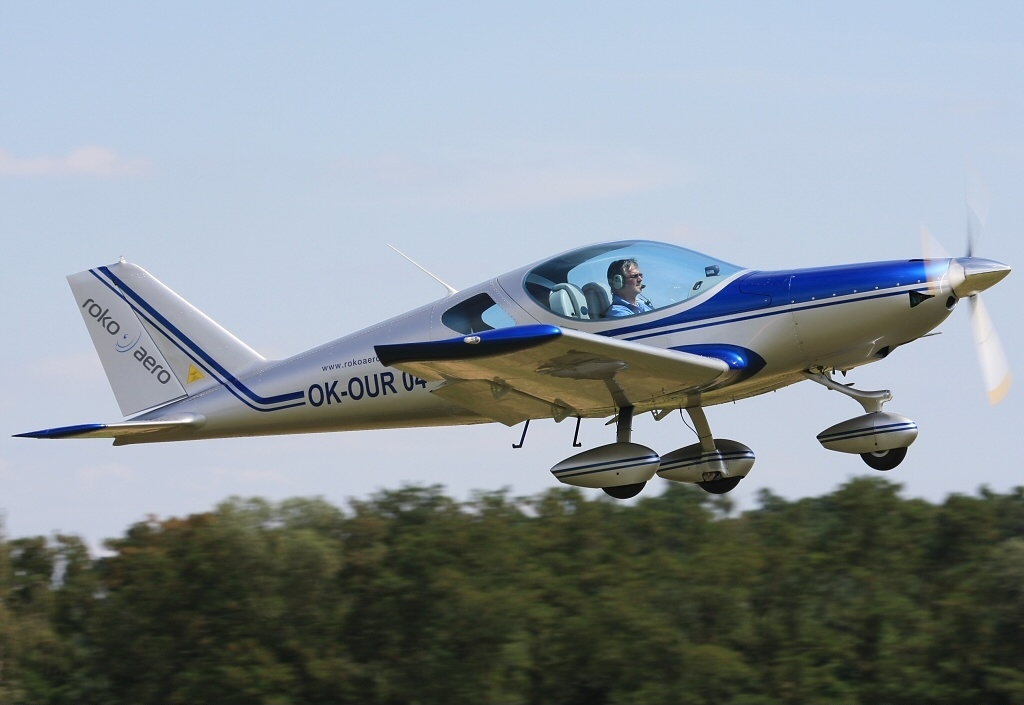

General information
- Type: Two-seat sports ultralight
- National origin: Czech Republic
- Manufacturer: Aero Roko A.S., Zlín
- Designer: Jiří Konečný
- Number built: 37 (2010)

History
- Introduction date: 2008
- First flight: 23 March 2008 (LSA)
- Developed from: CZAW SportCruiser

The Roko Aero NG4 is a single-engined sport aircraft, available in both light-sport aircraft and ultralight models, which seats two side by side. It is in production in the Czech Republic.

== Design and development ==
Jiří Konečný designed the CZAW SportCruiser while working for the Czech Aircraft Works (CZAW). His first design after he left CZAW to set up Roko Aero, the NG4 had much in common with the SportCruiser and uses some of its components, though the airframe is different in detail. Its commercial launch was in December 2007 and it was first shown in Prague in 2008. The two prototypes, one the ultralight NG4 UL and the other, the NG4 LSA meeting the LSA criteria, were demonstrated during 2008. The main differences between the two are in span and weight: the UL has a shorter span (8.10 m (26 ft 7 in) than the LSA (10.10 m (33 ft 2 in). With an empty weight of 298 kg (657 lb) the prototype UL was somewhat over its target of 280 kg (620 lb) but 32 kg (71 lb) lighter than the LSA.

The NG4 is a conventionally laid out low wing monoplane, built from riveted aluminium apart from composite wing tips and engine cowling. It has straight-tapered wings with barely swept leading edges. The UL version has upturned tips and the LSA short chord winglets. Four position split flaps fill the trailing edges inboard of the ailerons. The port aileron has a flight adjustable trim tab. The tail surfaces are also straight-tapered; fin and rudder are swept. Rear control surfaces, like the ailerons are unbalanced; there is a large, centrally placed elevator trim tab.

The cabin seats two side by side under a large, single-piece, forward-hinged canopy, with supplementary transparencies behind the seats where there is baggage space. Wing lockers provide further stowage space. The NG4 has a tricycle undercarriage with fuselage mounted cantilever spring legs. All wheels have spats.

The LSA prototype is powered by a 75 kW (101 hp) Rotax 912 ULS engine, but the 86 kW (115 hp) Rotax 914 ULS, 90 kW (120 hp) Jabiru 2200 and 93 kW (125 hp) Continental IO-240 are options. The two Rotax engines are also options for the UL version, together with the lower-powered 60 kW (80 hp) Rotax 912 UL.

== Operational history ==
By mid-2010, 12 NG4s appeared in European registers, and a total of 37 had been delivered.

== Specifications (LSA) ==
Data from Jane's All the World's Aircraft 1910/11 p.176

General characteristics

- Crew: 1
- Capacity: 1
- Length: 6.45 m (21 ft 2 in)
- Wingspan: 10.10 m (33 ft 2 in)
- Height: 2.28 m (7 ft 6 in)
- Wing area: 13.00 m^{2} (139.9 sq ft) gross
- Airfoil: MS316 at root, MS313 at tip
- Empty weight: 330 kg (728 lb)
- Max takeoff weight: 600 kg (1,323 lb)
- Fuel capacity: 130 L (28.6 Imp gal, 34.3 US gal)
- Powerplant: 1 × Rotax 912ULS flat four water/air cooled piston, 75 kW (100 hp)
- Propellers: 3-bladed Woodcomp

Performance

- Cruise speed: 240 km/h (150 mph, 130 kn)
- Stall speed: 55 km/h (34 mph, 30 kn) flaps down
- Never exceed speed: 270 km/h (170 mph, 150 kn)
- g limits: +4/-2

Avionics

- Standard VFR
- AvMap EKP IV GPS
- Dynon EFIS optional
