= Liberty Aerospace =

Defunct American aircraft manufacturer

Liberty Aerospace, Inc.
- Type: Private Corporation
- Industry: Aerospace
- Founded: 2000
- Founder: Anthony Tiarks
- Fate: Acquired by Discovery Aviation, Inc. April 2014
- Headquarters: Melbourne, Florida, United States
- Key people: Keith Markley (President, and CEO - 2006)
- Products: General aviation aircraft
- Number of employees: 32 (March 2009)
- Website: www.libertyaircraft.com

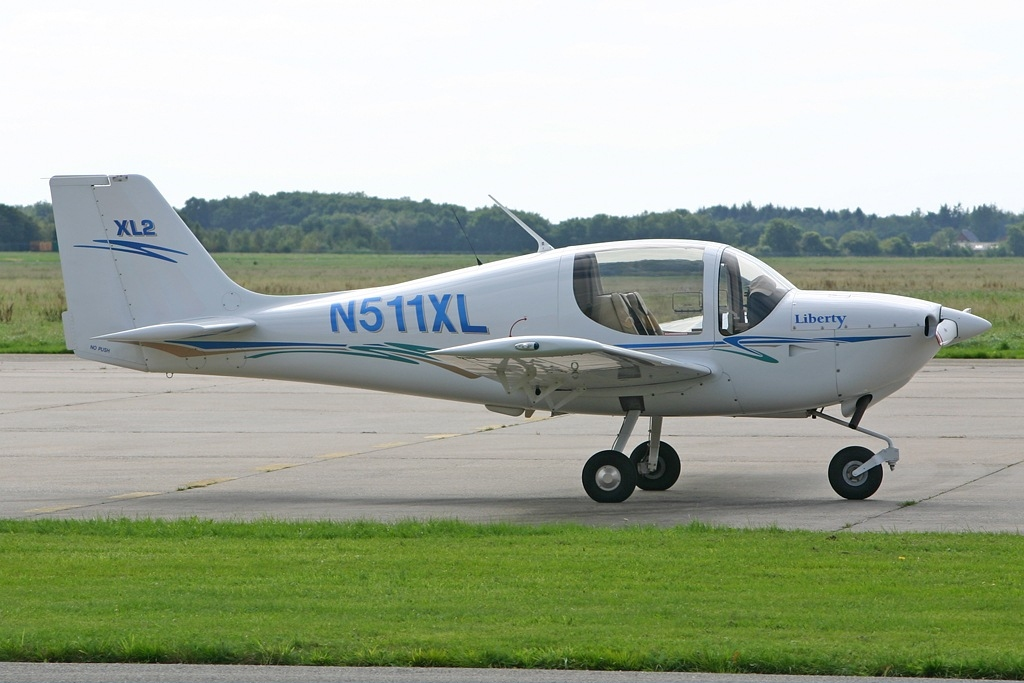
Liberty XL2

Liberty Aerospace, Inc. was a Bahrainian-owned manufacturer of general aviation aircraft based in Melbourne, Florida, United States.

The company, started by British entrepreneur Anthony Tiarks, produced one model, the Liberty XL2, a two-seat touring aircraft based on the British-designed Europa homebuilt airplane. Originally, the XL2 design received FAA production certification in the spring of 2006 and commenced sales in North America and the European market. In early April 2014, Discovery Aviation announced the acquisition of the Liberty XL-2's FAA type certificate, all rights to manufacture the Liberty XL-2 and that the resulting transaction, which saw the former senior management team of Liberty Aerospace join Discovery Aviation, would allow the aircraft to resume production. The Sausalito, California based Discovery Aviation chose to consolidate the companies at the Liberty Aerospace Melbourne, Florida facilities and retired the Liberty Aerospace company name.

== Key personnel ==
Liberty's key personnel in 2006 were:

- President and chief executive officer: Keith Markley
- Chief operating officer: Paul Bartlett
- Chief financial officer: Scott Meder
- General counsel: Margaret Napolitan

== History ==
Liberty Aerospace, Inc. was incorporated as a Delaware For-Profit Corporation on October 6, 2000 (File # 3299031). Liberty Aerospace, Inc. was registered as a Florida Foreign For-Profit Corporation on April 7, 2004 (Doc # F03000001707). Liberty Aerospace Holdings, Inc. was incorporated as a Delaware For-Profit Corporation on April 23, 2004 (File # 3517687).

In October 2004, the Kuwait Finance House, a wholly owned subsidiary of Kuwait Finance House of Bahrain, acquired 75% of Liberty Aerospace for approximately US$60 million.

=== April 2008 outsourcing to Romania ===
In a news release issued in April 2008, Liberty Aerospace CEO Keith Markley announced that some of the 180 employees at the Melbourne, Florida manufacturing facility will lose their jobs when the company starts outsourcing aircraft production to Romania. He indicated that the company will maintain its headquarters in Melbourne, but it is not clear how many employees will be still be employed by the company in the USA.

=== August 2008 special certification review controversy ===
In August 2008 the Federal Aviation Administration, in releasing information on a Special Certification Review (SCR) that was being conducted on Eclipse Aviation, also listed Liberty Aerospace as undergoing an SCR. The company quickly denied that they were subject to an SCR and asked the FAA to retract the statement.

The FAA clarified that Liberty was not under an SCR, but was subject to an unspecified special review of another type.

Liberty Aerospace General Counsel and Safety and Compliance Officer Margaret Napolitan said: "It's a commercial dispute. It has nothing to do with the safety of the aircraft." Neither the company nor the FAA have released any further information.

=== Great Recession ===
In November 2008, responding to the Great Recession, Liberty announced a package of incentives for aircraft buyers who bought a Liberty XL2 before December 31, 2008. The added incentives included free fuel for 125 flying hours, free scheduled maintenance for 125 flying hours, free insurance and five hours of free flight training. The company also matched deposits made on competing aircraft up to $5,000 for buyers who chose a Liberty aircraft over a competitor's product.

In February 2009 the company announced that it will create an independent division called Liberty Composites that will market its composite construction skills outside the aviation industry.

By March 2009 the company had laid off all but 32 workers of its previous 180-person workforce, citing the global economic situation that has resulted in a sharp decline in sales. CEO Keith Markley indicated the company intends to rehire its workers when conditions permit. The company had delivered a total of 100 XL-2s by the end of February 2009.

The company decided to offer its fleet of eight demonstrator aircraft for sale in December 2009 at deeply discounted prices.

In April 2011 the company consolidated its operations in Melbourne, Florida by giving up expiring leases on two of its five buildings. At that time the company continued to supply parts for their fleet in the field and build aircraft to order.

During 2011 the company shipped only two aircraft and none during the first two-quarters of 2012. In late September 2012 the sale of 50 XL-2s to the city of Wuhan, China was announced.

=== 2014 merger ===
In early April 2014 the company announced that it was merging with Discovery Aviation with the intention of returning the XL-2 to production.
