= Continental O-240 =

1970s American aircraft piston engine

O-240
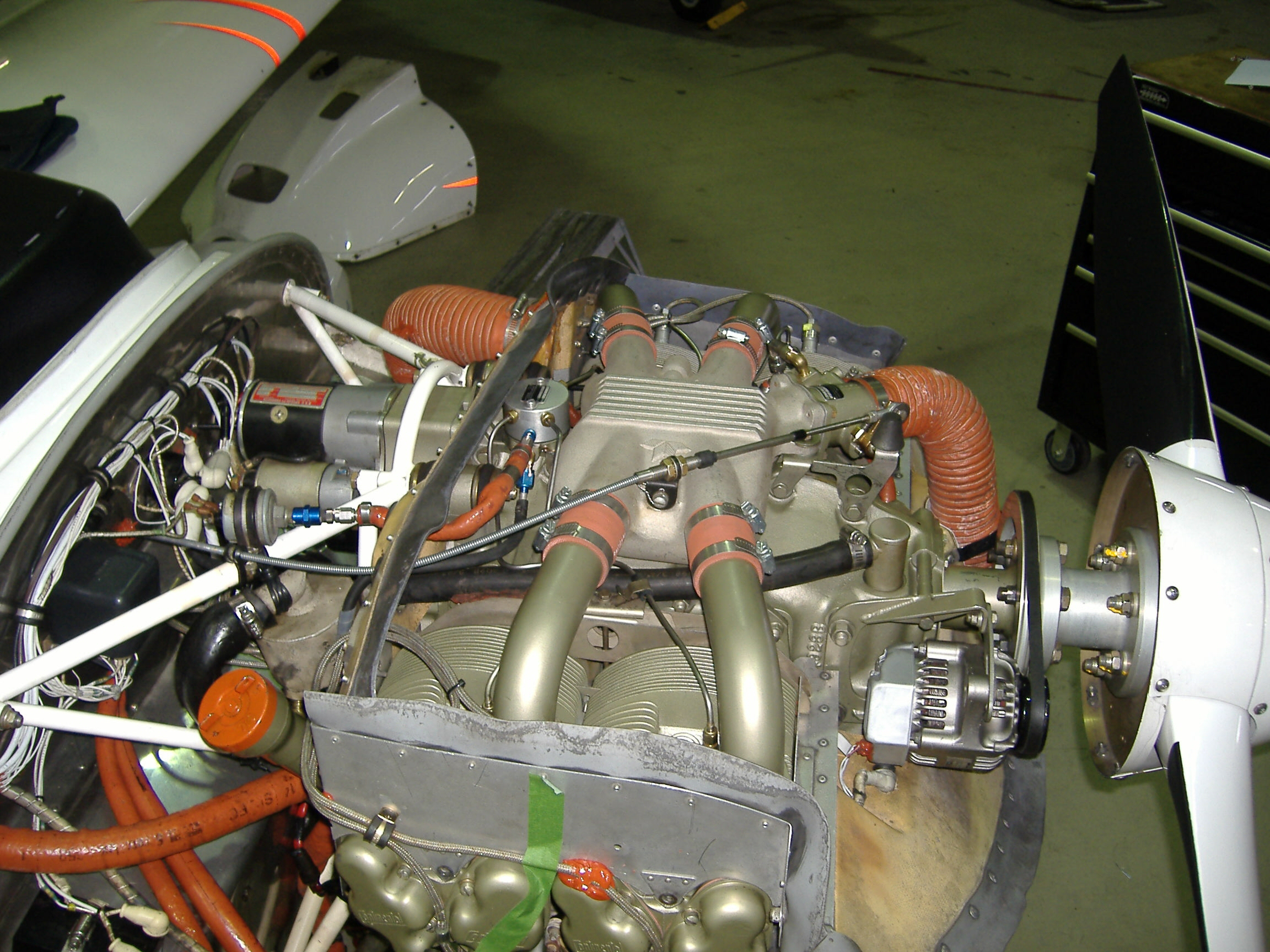
- Continental IO-240B
- Type: Piston aero-engine
- National origin: United States
- Manufacturer: Teledyne Continental Motors
- First run: 1971
- Major applications: Issoire APM 40 Simba; Diamond DA20-C1; AESL Airtourer; Liberty XL2
- Manufactured: 1971–present, 1993–present (IO)
- Developed from: Continental O-360

The Continental O-240 engine is a four-cylinder, horizontally opposed, air-cooled aircraft engine that was developed in the late 1960s for use in light aircraft by Continental Motors, Inc. The first O-240 was certified on 7 July 1971.

== Design and development ==
The 130 hp (97 kW) O-240 was a new engine design derived from the six-cylinder Continental O-360 and introduced in 1971. It is generally similar in overall dimensions to the Continental O-200, but with a higher 8.5:1 compression ratio, designed to run on 100/130 avgas. The O-240 delivers 30% more power than the O-200 while it weighs only 12% more. It may be mounted in tractor or pusher configuration.

The O-240 was produced under license in the United Kingdom by Rolls-Royce Limited and was used to power the Reims-Cessna FRA150 Aerobat, a more powerful aerobatic model of the Cessna 150 constructed in France by Reims Aviation under license. Rolls-Royce acquired the rights to the O-240, but not the IO-240 in 1977.

The fuel-injected IO-240-A and -B were introduced in 1993. The A and B versions differ only in the type of fuel injector used.

The IOF-240 is similar to the IO-240-B except that it employs an Aerosance FADEC system to control the ignition and fuel injection systems. The engine was not selected to power any production North American-manufactured aircraft until the Liberty XL2 entered production in 2006 powered by the IOF-240-B.

== Variants ==
O-240-A
Dual ignition, 130 hp (97 kW) at 2800 rpm, dry weight 246 lb (112 kg) including starter and generator. Uses a Marvel-Schebler MA-3SPA IO 5067 carburetor. Certified 7 July 1971
IO-240-A
Dual ignition, 125 hp (93 kW) at 2800 rpm, dry weight 246 lb (112 kg), uses a TCM 639231A27 fuel injector
IO-240-B
Dual ignition, 125 hp (93 kW) at 2800 rpm, dry weight 246 lb (112 kg), uses a TCM 639231A34 fuel injector
IOF-240-B
Aerosance FADEC system controls the ignition and fuel injection systems, 125 hp (93 kW) at 2800 rpm, dry weight 255 lb (116 kg)

== Applications ==
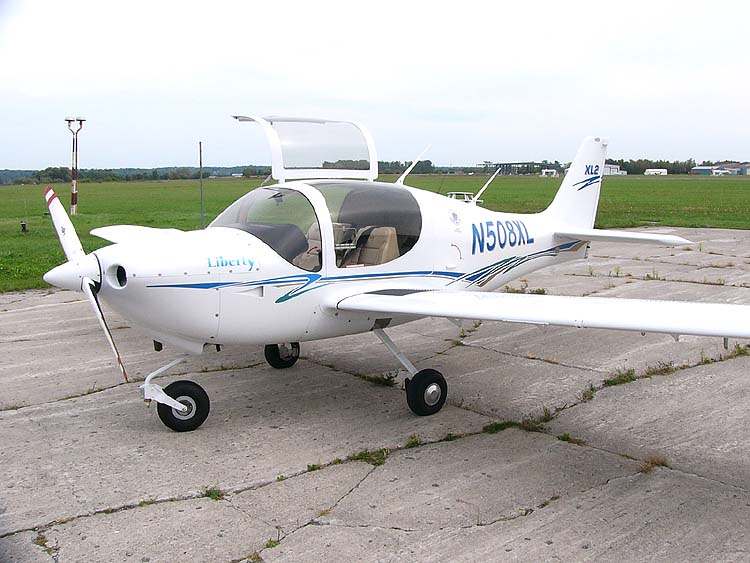
The Liberty XL2 is equipped with a Continental IOF-240-B engine.

O-240

- AESL Airtourer T3
- Reims Cessna FRA150 Aerobat ("R" meaning a Rolls-Royce-built O-240)
- Rutan Voyager (front engine)
- Practavia Sprite
- Rollason Condor (D62C)
- St Croix Pietenpol Aerial
- Tri-R KIS TR-1
- Warner Revolution II

IO-240

- American Homebuilts John Doe
- Diamond DA20-C1
- Eagle Aircraft 150B
- Rans S-16 Shekari
- Roko Aero NG4

IOF-240-B

- Issoire APM 40 Simba
- Liberty XL2

== Specifications (IOF-240-B) ==
Data from TYPE CERTIFICATE DATA SHEET NO. E7SO

=== General characteristics ===
- Type: "4-cylinder, air-cooled, naturally aspirated, horizontally opposed, fuel-injected, spark ignition, four-stroke, direct drive. The engine incorporates a full authority digital electronic control (FADEC) system to control the ignition and fuel injection functions."
- Bore: 4.438 in (112.7 mm)
- Stroke: 3.875 in (98.4 mm)
- Displacement: 240 in^{3} (3.93 L)
- Dry weight: 255 lb (116 kg)

=== Components ===
- Valvetrain: One intake and one exhaust valve per cylinder
- Fuel system: Aerosance FADEC system
- Fuel type: 100LL avgas
- Cooling system: Air-cooled

=== Performance ===
- Power output: 125 hp (93 kW) at 2,800 rpm
- Specific power: 0.52 hp/in^{3} (23.66 kW/L)
- Compression ratio: 8.5:1
- Power-to-weight ratio: 0.49 hp/lb (0.80 kW/kg)

== See also ==
- Lycoming IO-233
- List of aircraft engines
