= Europa XS =

British kit aircraft

Europa XS series
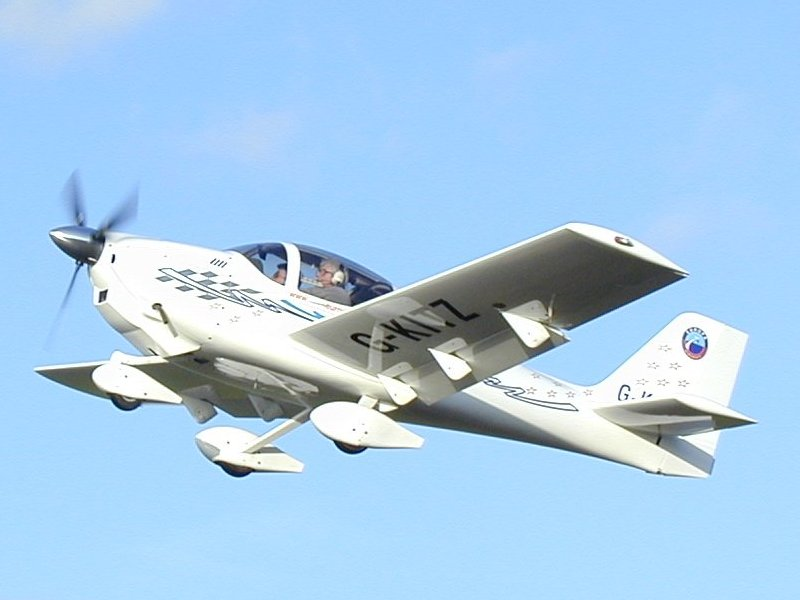

General information
- Type: Kit aircraft
- National origin: United Kingdom
- Manufacturer: Europa Aircraft
- Designer: Ivan Shaw
- Number built: 495 by 2011

History
- Manufactured: 1994-present
- First flight: 12 September 1992
- Variant: Liberty XL2

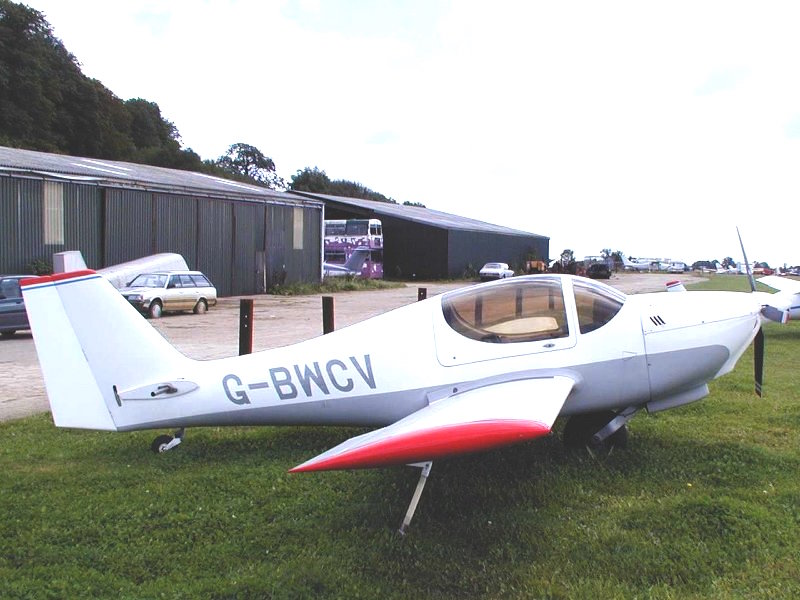
Europa Classic with mono-wheel landing gear

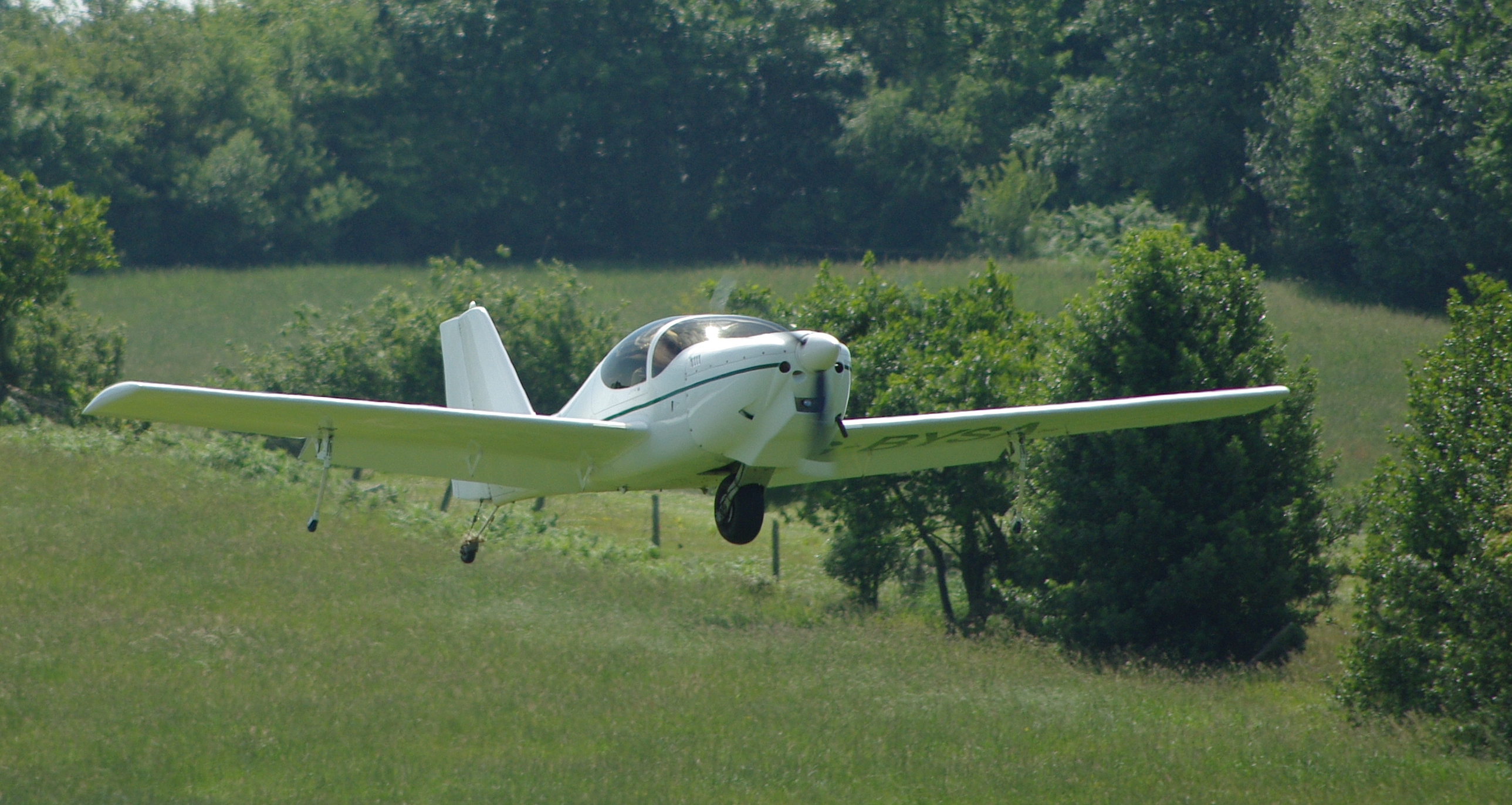
Rotax 912ULS powered XS takes off showing its single mainwheel and outriggers

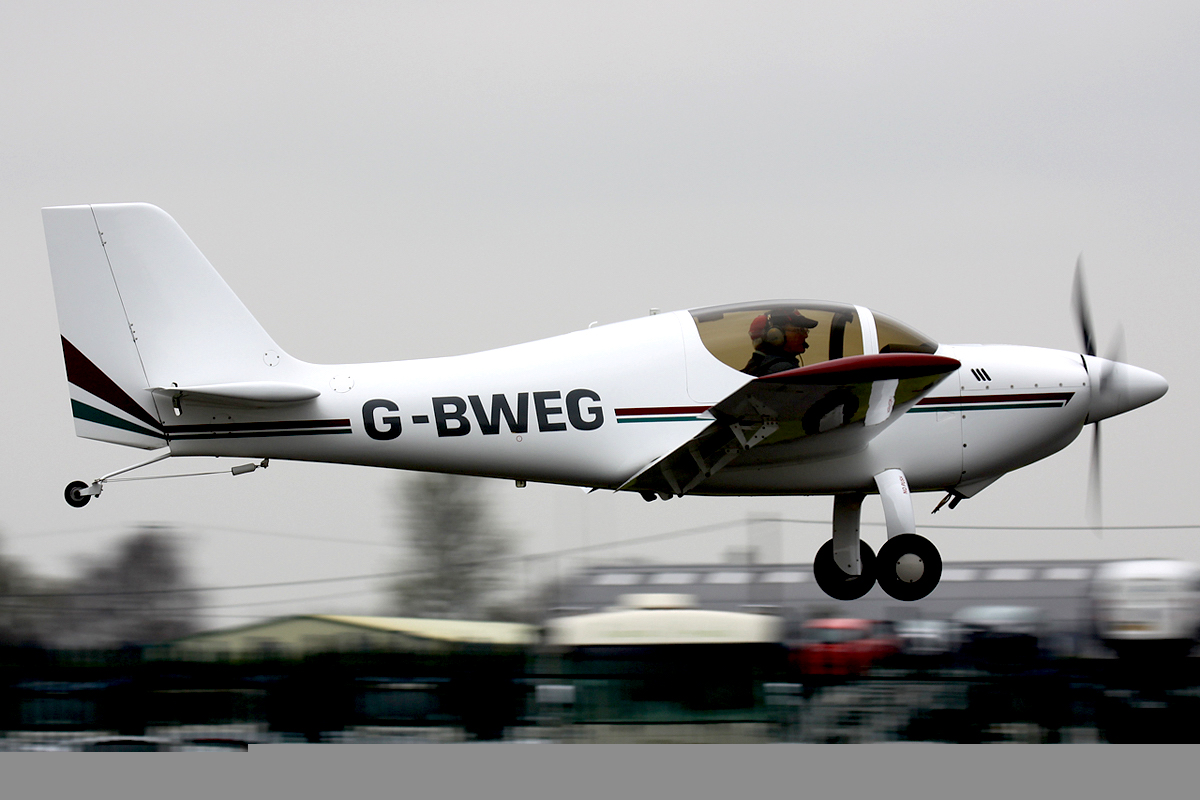
Europa taildragger

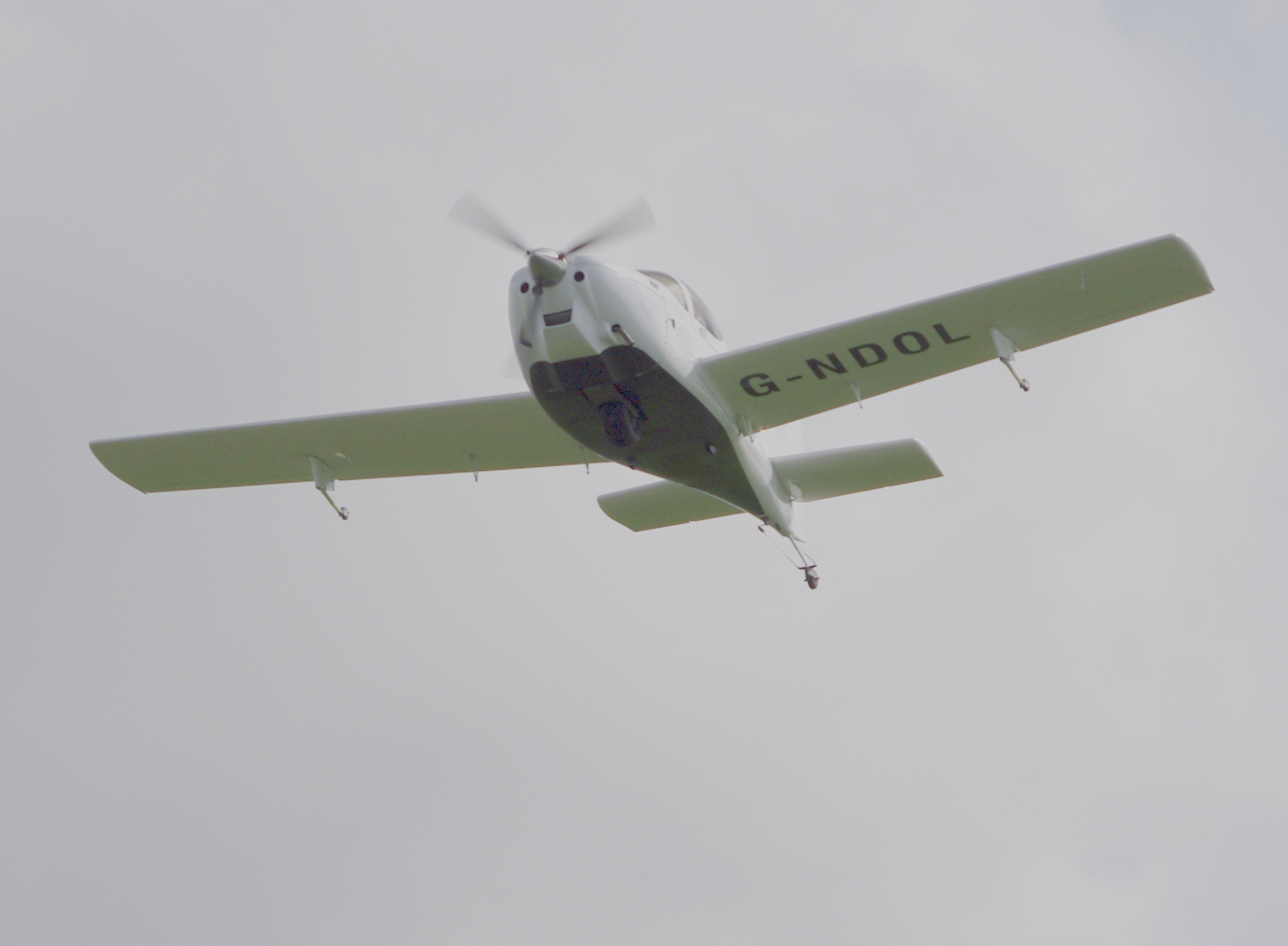
Europa Classic with monowheel gear and Subaru engine, flaps retracted and outriggers latched up

The Europa XS and Europa Classic are a family of British composite two-place low-wing monoplane kit aircraft. Designed by Ivan Shaw, the Europa was introduced in the early 1990s. Europas are manufactured by Europa Aircraft and supplied as kits for amateur construction. More than 450 Europas have been completed.

The Europa was conceived as a modern kit aircraft for personal use within Europe. Its design aims were: high speed, low cost, able to be built and stored at home, easily transportable on a trailer, using Mogas fuel, able to be rigged for flight in under five minutes, carrying two people in comfort, and providing sufficient baggage for extended touring. Apart from "low cost", these objectives were largely met.

== Development ==
Ivan Shaw's design work on the Europa, as it was initially named, began in January 1990. The first prototype, G-YURO, first flew on 12 September 1992 and Popular Flying Association certification was gained in May 1993. Most Europas have been sold in kit form, although five factory-assembled aircraft were produced between 1994 and 1996. The first kit-built aircraft to be completed flew on 14 October 1995. By the autumn of 2007 450 Europas of all types had been completed and were flying.

The basic design was later developed by Ivan Shaw into a United States FAR certified aircraft, built by Liberty Aerospace in the US as the Liberty XL2.

The Europa is classified as a homebuilt in its home country of the UK and qualifies for a Permit to Fly. It has been certified for night and IMC with the first aircraft being G-URMS in July 2020, and the second being G-NICX. Previous restrictions of flying over built up areas were removed during 2008. In Canada the Europa is an amateur-built aircraft and qualifies for a Special Certificate of Airworthiness.

In 1997 UK Prime Minister Tony Blair launched the Millennium Products competition to promote British industry in the 21st century. This culminated in 1999 with a winners list of 1012 manufacturers and their products. One of these was the Europa XS, described as "A light aircraft which offers speed, economy and performance and can be stored on a trailer in your garage."

Europas are flown in Europe in the very light aircraft category. In the United States the Europa XS is currently awaiting light-sport aircraft certification and as of April 2017 the design does not appear on the Federal Aviation Administration's list of approved special light-sport aircraft.

== Design ==
The streamlined composite design and the particularly low canopy give the Europa both high cruise speeds of 200 mph (320 km/h) and fuel efficiency of 50 mpg_{‑imp} (5.6 L/100 km) due to its low drag. The Europa can be fitted with Rotax 912UL of 80 hp (60 kW), the 100 hp (75 kW) Rotax 912ULS or the turbocharged 115 hp (86 kW) Rotax 914 engine.

In the early stages of development, Shaw had proposed powering the Europa with a British-made MidWest twin-rotor wankel 110bhp engine which was lightweight, powerful, compact and very smooth. However Shaw became dissatisfied by its somewhat crude Tillotson carburettors. Eventually, a sophisticated TR7-derived fuel-injection system became available for the MidWest engine, but by this time Shaw's choice of a Rotax flat-four for the Europa was fixed. (Shaw had earlier built a Rutan "Twin-EZ", a canard kitplane with twin Norton Wankel engines).

Europas first became available with a monowheel landing gear and a tailwheel. The wings had small castors on outriggers that were lowered with the flaps. Shaw chose the monowheel configuration for its perceived advantages of reduced weight and improved performance over a tricycle configuration. In practice, the monowheel Europa proved tricky in inexperienced hands and could be prone to prop-strikes and groundlooping (partly due to the lack of differential braking) so the company developed a tricycle undercarriage which has become the more popular version, particularly as any performance disadvantage has been slight.

Europas can be fitted with either normal (tourer) wings made out of fiberglass, with 102 sq ft (9.5 m^{2}) wing area and 13.43 lb/ft^{2} wing loading at MTOW, or motorglider wings, made from carbon fiber with a greater span. Since the fuselage is common to both motorglider and tourer then with both sets of wings the same fuselage can be configured as a tourer and a motorglider alternately. The wings can be removed for transportation or storage in five minutes.

The Europa touring wing uses a unique Dykins 12% thickness/chord ratio airfoil designed by Don Dykins, who had been deputy Chief Aerodynamicist at Hawker Siddeley Aviation, and later technical director of British Aerospace and chief aerodynamicist on the European Airbus.

The motorglider wing uses a different wing section, also designed by Dykins, with its center of pressure coincident with that of the smaller wing to ensure that the rudder and tailplane are equally effective with either. Wingspan is increased to 42 feet (13 m) bringing the wing area to 135 sq ft (12.5 m^{2}). The motorglider wings are fitted with airbrakes rather than flaps.

Development is also under way for wings suitable for a light-sport aircraft variant of Europa XS.

The fuel tanks are located in the fuselage and have a capacity of 18 U.S. gallons (68 L; 15 imp gal) standard and 28 U.S. gallons (110 L; 23 imp gal) optional. This gives a range of 841 mi (1,353 km) standard or 1,256 mi (2,021 km) extended at economy cruise setting. The plane can use AVGAS or MOGAS depending on engine requirements and national regulations. It is also possible to upgrade fuel capacity with the addition of extra fuel tanks.

== Variants ==
Europa Classic
Originally called simply "Europa", this version is now known as the Classic and is easily recognised by its monowheel undercarriage. Kits for amateur building are no longer in production. The laminar-flow wings have foam cores that are skinned with glass fibre cloth and resin. Some elements of the later Europa XS can be incorporated into a Classic and vice versa. Europa builders invariably purchased the kit in stages, so some who had completed the fuselage were able to then opt for the quick-build Europa XS wings.
Europa XS
Introduced in 1997, the Europa XS is available in two models – the Europa XS Monowheel and the Europa XS Trigear. The XS incorporates many incremental improvements over the Classic, including preformed hollow wings, a more streamlined cowling, extended tailwheel, enlarged baggage bay, and a smaller spinner that was easier to balance. These developments meant that Europa XS could now offer extra speed, range, baggage space and comfort. It was also designed to reduce the build-time and simplify building.
Europa Motorglider
Introduced in 1997. Long span glider wings can be interchanged with the wings on the Europa XS Monowheel and Trigear.
Europa LSA
The Europa light-sport aircraft has a new carbon fibre wing incorporating a leading-edge slot. The result is a wing weight reduction of 30%. It reduces the maximum takeoff weight to 1,320 lb (599 kg) with an empty weight of 520 lb (236 kg), giving a slightly increased payload. A concept version appeared at Sun 'n Fun in May 2010 and the production aircraft debuted at AirVenture 2012. The LSA was launched in the US at Sun n Fun April 2011. As of April 2017, the design does not appear on the Federal Aviation Administration's list of approved special light-sport aircraft.
Europa Taildragger
Some Europas with conventional taildragger configuration have been built. These are not "factory" versions, but they do have LAA approval. They are said to have easier handling than the monowheel version.

== Accidents ==
On 1 June 2007 a Europa Classic, registration G-HOFC, broke up during a flight over South Wales, United Kingdom, killing both occupants. The investigation indicated irregularities in the construction of the right wing attachment at the rear lift/drag pin. There was also evidence of movement of the tailplane surfaces beyond the normal range of movement.

As a result of the initial findings, the Light Aircraft Association released two Airworthiness Bulletins requiring immediate and repetitive inspections:

- PFA 247/FSB006 ‘Europa Classic and Europa XS Tailplane Flutter Avoidance and Integrity Of Tailplane Attachment’
- PFA 247/FSB007 ‘Europa Classic Integrity of Wing Attachment’.

The content of these Airworthiness Bulletins was made mandatory in the UK by the issue of Mandatory Permit Directives. The final accident report concludes that these modifications and the mandated inspections of aircraft already completed, adequately address the construction issue. This accident affects only Europa Classics, all of which should have now been modified, and not the XS model which has a different structure.

== Aircraft on display ==
- Yorkshire Air Museum - prototype Europa G-YURO, painted in its Millennium Product colours.

== Specifications (Europa XS, tricycle undercarriage) ==
Data from Jane's All The World's Aircraft 2003–2004

General characteristics

- Crew: 2
- Length: 5.84 m (19 ft 2 in)
- Wingspan: 8.28 m (27 ft 2 in)
- Height: 2.13 m (7 ft 0 in)
- Wing area: 9.48 m^{2} (102 sq ft)
- Aspect ratio: 7.2:1
- Empty weight: 354 kg (780 lb)
- Gross weight: 621 kg (1,370 lb)
- Powerplant: 1 × Rotax 912 ULS , 74 kW (99 hp)

Performance

- Cruise speed: 250 km/h (155 mph, 135 kn)
- Range: 1,355 km (732 mi, 636 nmi)
- Rate of climb: 5.1 m/s (1,000 ft/min)

== See also ==
Aircraft of comparable role, configuration, and era

- Dyn'Aéro Ban-Bi
- Rans S-19 Venterra
- Whisper Motor Glider
- Europa Elite
