= Don Dykins =

British aerodynamicist

Donald Dykins (January 1928 - 31 January 2016) FRAeS was a British aerodynamicist.

== Early life ==
He was born in Bedwellty in south-east Wales.

== Career ==
=== Hawker Siddeley Aviation ===
He became deputy chief aerodynamicist of Hawker Siddeley, working on the Hawker Siddeley Trident. For aerodynamics, Hawker Siddeley Aviation won the 1976 Queen's Award for Technological Achievement, known as the Queen's Award for Enterprise: Innovation (Technology).

=== British Aerospace ===
He became the Chief Aerodynamicist of British Aerospace, and the technical director for the civil aircraft division, working with Chief Engineer David McRae.

Became well known for work on the Europa Aircraft.

== Personal life ==
He married in 1953 in Sheffield; they had three sons (born 1956, 1959, and 1968) and one daughter (born 1960). He became a Fellow of the Royal Aeronautical Society in May 1994. He died in January 2016, aged 88. His funeral was held on 11 February 2016.

== See also ==
- Clive Leyman (Welsh), chief aerodynamicist of Concorde
