= Diamond DA20 Katana =

Austrian light aircraft

DA20/DV20 Katana
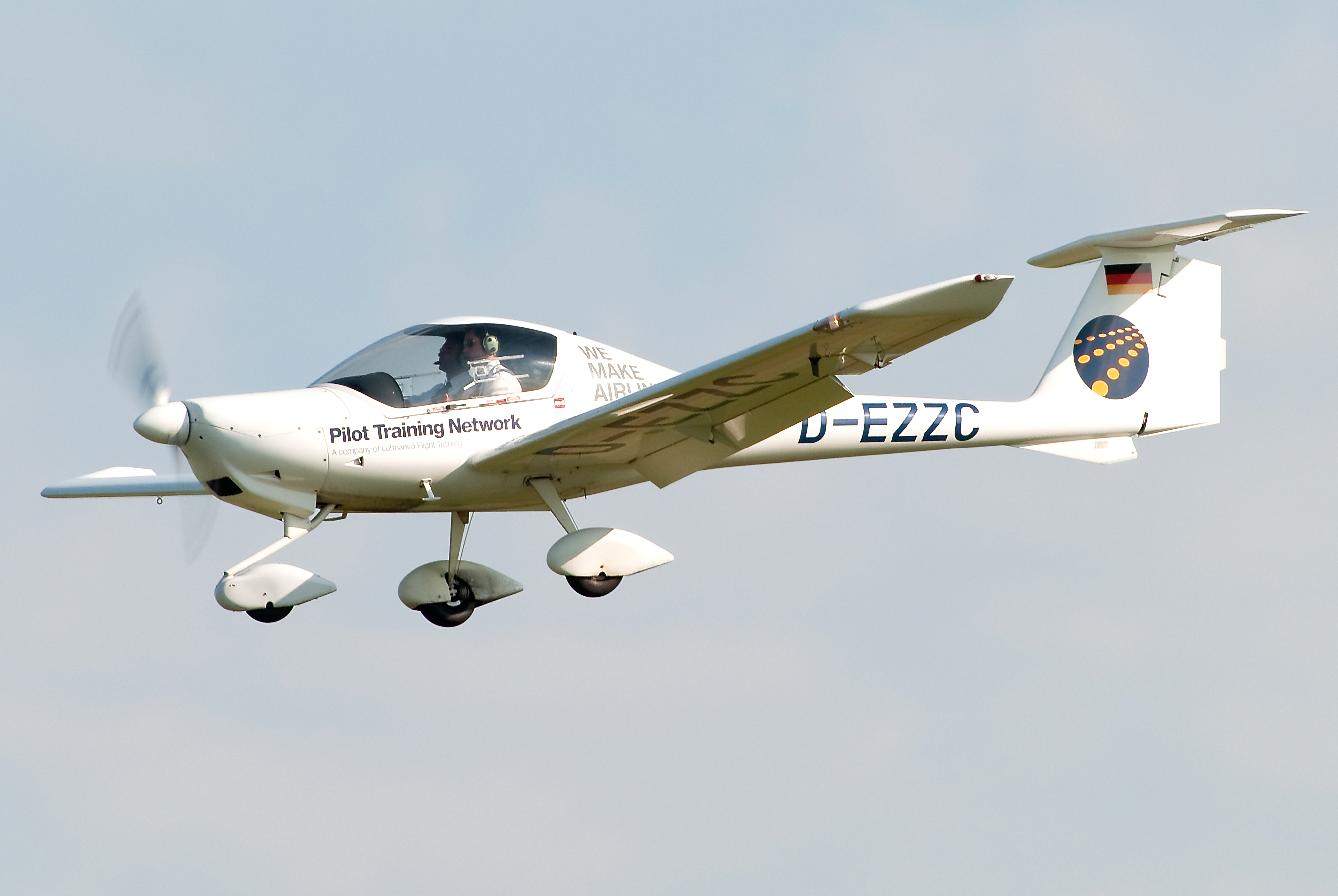
- Diamond DA20 in flight

General information
- Type: Two-seat light aircraft
- National origin: Austria (DV20); Canada (DA20)
- Manufacturer: Diamond Aircraft
- Status: Active
- Number built: 1,000+

History
- Manufactured: 1994–present
- Introduction date: 1992
- First flight: 1991
- Developed from: Diamond HK36 Super Dimona
- Developed into: Diamond DA40 Diamond Star

The Diamond DV20/DA20 Katana is an Austrian-designed two-seat general aviation light aircraft. Developed and manufactured by Diamond Aircraft, it was originally produced in Austria as the DV20.

The DV20 shares many features from the earlier Diamond HK36 Super Dimona. It was introduced to service during 1993. During the 1990s, production of the type was commenced at a new facility in Canada in order to meet demand for the type within the North American market. The Canadian-produced aircraft are designated as the DA20. It has been a relative success on the market, having sold in excess of 1,000 aircraft by 2008 and multiple improved variants of the DA20 have been developed. Additionally, it has been further developed into the four-seat Diamond DA40 Diamond Star.

== Development ==
=== Origins ===
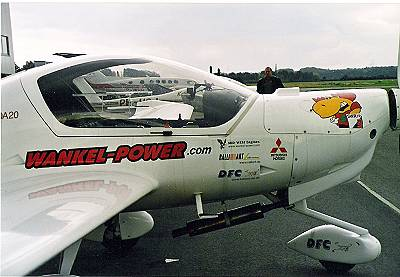
Diamond DA20 with Diamond Engines Wankel

In 1981, a new company, Hoffmann Flugzeugbau, was formed in Austria with the aim of becoming a major aircraft manufacturer for general aviation purposes. During the late 1980s, management at the firm continued to rapidly expand its range of products; it also underwent several changes in name and ownership, eventually becoming Diamond Aircraft. It was decided to develop a new two-seat aircraft, later designated as the DV20 Katana, using the earlier and successful Diamond HK36 Dimona as a basis.

The DV20, while owing much of its design and sharing many features of the Dimona, had several major differences as well. In particular, it had a reduced wingspan, was equipped with flaps, and made use of a tricycle landing gear arrangement. The Katana has also been developed with a philosophy of offering aircraft that weren't equivalent in terms of performance to any major existing product from competing manufacturers, consciously avoiding instances of direct head-to-head competition. In 1991, the Katana conducted its maiden flight; during May 1993, the type received certification. In 1993, the Katana was first displayed to the general public at the Paris Air Show.

Originally placed into production in Austria, during the early 1990s, a purpose-built factory was established by Diamond in London, Ontario, Canada to produce the DV20, which was subsequently designated as the DA20. The DA20 featured around 40 individual improvements, having been effectively revamped to take on the competitive general aircraft market in the region. According to aerospace publication Flight International, the decision to transfer production to Canada was to meet demand for such an aircraft within the sizable North American market; in addition, the firm already considered itself secure in its dominance in the European general aircraft market. In 1994, the first Canadian-produced DA20, a Rotax 912-powered A1 aircraft, was completed; it was the first Diamond aircraft available for sale in North America. Between 1994 and 1999, in excess of C$100 million was invested in the Canadian plant.

=== Further development ===
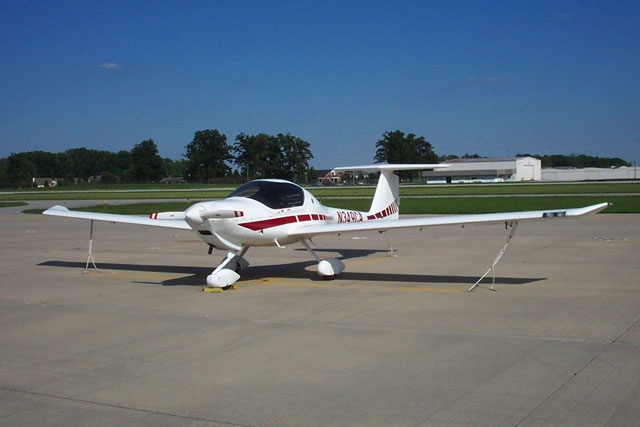
1999 model DA20-C1 Eclipse

During 1998, production of the Continental IO-240-B3B-powered C1 Evolution and Eclipse models commenced, which was also performed at the firm's Canadian facility. The C1 model featured several advances, including the adoption of a new engine, which was more powerful than the Rotax 912 and provided the plane with greater performance as a result; other improvements included increased comfort, the adoption of slotted-flaps, and an improved braking capability. During the late 1990s, Diamond also developed a new four-seat aircraft, designated as the DA40, which had been heavily derived from the DA20.

Both the DA20-A1 and C1 are certified under AWM 523-VLA in Canada, as well as being under FAR 23 in the USA. The DA20 is certified in the utility category; in particular, it is permissible to intentionally spin it with flaps in the full up position. In 2004, Diamond received Chinese certification for the DA20. Both models also hold Joint Aviation Authorities (JAA) certification.

Although the DA20 is available with instrumentation and avionics suitable for flight under instrument flight rules (IFR), its plastic airframe lacks lightning protection and thus does not qualify for IFR certification. This limitation is not viewed as being relevant to most potential customers; according to aircraft publication Flying, "even when there were a lot of two-place trainers, there wasn't a lot of instrument training done in them...not too many owners of two-seaters fly them IFR".

By 2010, production of the original A1 Katana model had come to an end, while the newer DA20-C1 model was still being manufactured. In November 2008, the company announced that it would be offering an Aspen Avionics glass cockpit primary flight display as an option on the DA20. Diamond indicated the Aspen PFD would be easy to incorporate into the existing instrument panel design because it mounts in a standard round instrument hole. In October 2009, the company introduced the Garmin G500 glass cockpit as an option.

In 2026, production restarted in Wiener Neustadt for the new DV20-E variant powered by a Rotax 912iSc3 Sport with a 2-blade MTV-21-A / 175-05 constant speed propeller; with deliveries starting in June 2026.

== Design ==
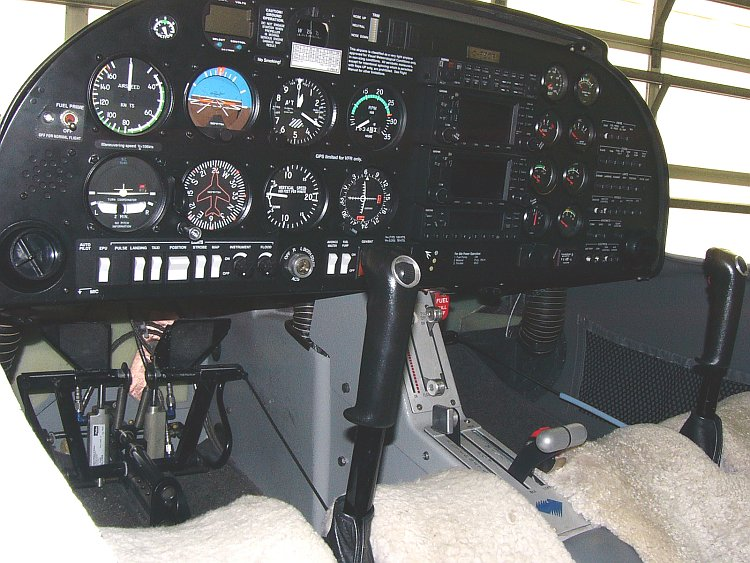
DA20-C1 Eclipse instrument panel

The Diamond DA20 Katana is a low-wing cantilever monoplane, commonly operated as a low-cost two-seat trainer aircraft. According to Flight International, it has been considered to be relatively unorthodox amongst trainers, utilising a design that makes heavy use of the manufacturer's prior glider products. The Katana benefits in the training role from its relative ease of handling and responsive controls. In comparison to traditional trainer aircraft, it has been marketed as substantially reducing the associated fuel and maintenance costs of operation, while providing favourable flight qualities and the necessary range for trainees to gain experience with. For a time, the Katana was the only two-seat composite training aircraft available that offered both low costs and incorporated advanced technologies, giving it an effective niche in the sector.

The Katana has several distinctive features, including its all-composite construction, low-mounted wing, T-tail arrangement, and a castoring nosewheel. All models make use of a composite airframe which is constructed of glass- and carbon-fiber reinforced plastic. The one-piece fuselage has removable wings, which assists with transportation and servicing activities. The wings themselves have transparent plexiglas panels present so that key control elements can be readily inspected without disassembly. The airframe is complete with a sleek finish across the entirety of its exterior, which serves to eliminate corrosion and rivets in order to lower maintenance requirements. The maintenance costs of the Katana have been considered to be relatively low.

The Katana provides excellent external visibility to its pilots via the use of a one-piece bubble canopy, which is hinged at the rear, enabling easy entry using the built-in steps. The cockpit features a comprehensive six-unit instrumentation panel on the left-hand side, the majority of avionics-related controls and displays in the center of the console, and engine-specific elements are allocated to the right-hand panel. The Katana makes use of individual stick-type flight control, as opposed to yokes, along with key engine controls on a centrally positioned pedestal. There has been positive reports on the aircraft's comfort, the crew accommodated on fixed-position reclined seats with a small personal stowage area located directly behind; the noise levels are so low that headsets are typically unnecessary for voice communication, although an intercom system is integrated for this purpose.

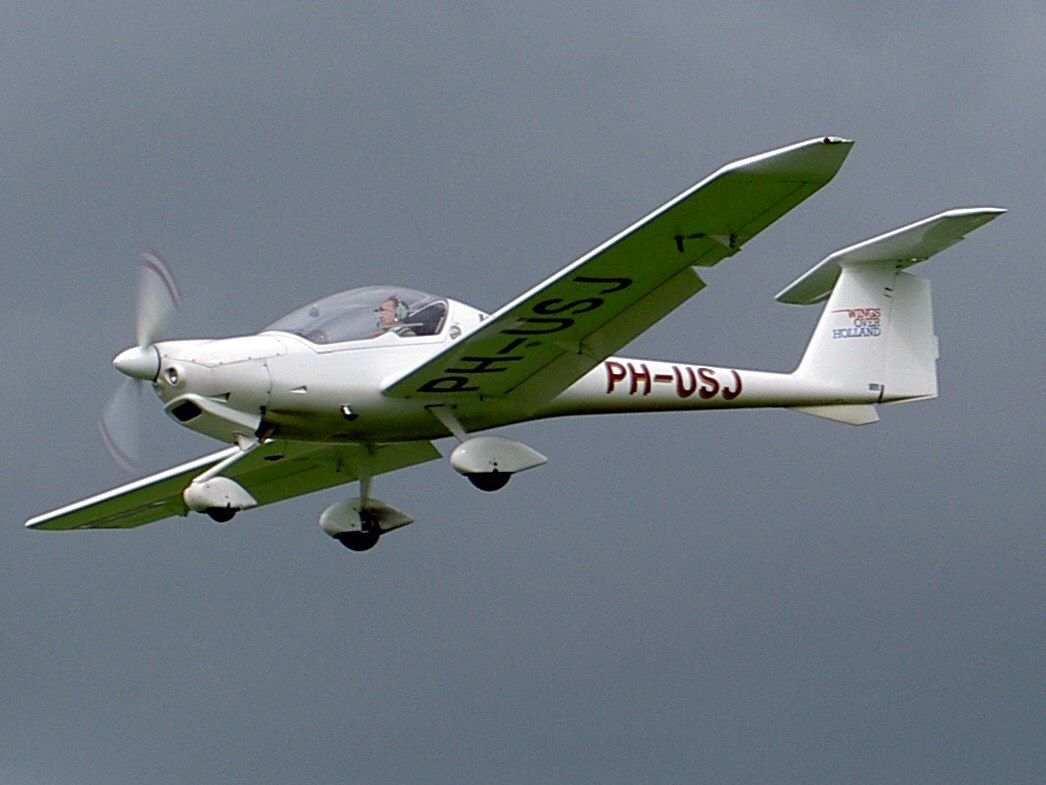
DV 20 Katana

The nose wheel of the DA20 is not linked to the rudder pedals and turns while taxiing are made with differential braking, with rudder steering becoming more effective as airspeed increases. The Katana possesses a higher glide ratio than many of its competitors; its glide ratio is 11:1 and the DA20-A1 is 14:1. The aircraft does not feature any instances of vortex generators, wing fences or many other aerodynamic devices, aside from the integral winglets, which positively contribute to roll stability, drag-reduction, and enhanced aileron effectiveness. The Katana's T-tail configuration has also been claimed to reduce the negative effects of propeller-generated slipstream on the aircraft's pitch control as well as increase low-speed pitch authority.

The wings have washout, which causes the wing roots to stall in advance of the wingtips, which has the effect of the ailerons being fully effective well after the onset of a primary stall condition. Other unfavourable flight conditions are often guarded against, such as a wing drop, which may be produced only as a consequence of prolonged and excessive elevator application during a steep climbing turn, and can be rectified by the relaxation of back pressure. The control forces across all regimes are well-balanced, which reportedly reduces the frequency to which trimming of the control surfaces may need to be performed. Two of the three flight control surfaces, being the elevators and ailerons, are push-rod actuated, while control of the rudder is achieved via cables. As a measure to protect against instances of over-rotation, a reinforced plastic skid is present underneath the tail unit.

The Katana C is fitted with a Continental O-240 piston engine, while the earlier "A" model has a Rotax 912. Variants powered by the Rotax engine have been approved for use with standard automotive gasoline, automotive-grade oil Mobil is also recommended for use as a lubricant. In the event of a loss of coolant, the Rotax engine is capable of 'dry running' for up to 2 hours without any resulting damage if run at or below 56 percent power. The aircraft's constant-speed propeller is hydraulically actuated and fitted with composite blades. A unique clutch arrangement automatically disengages the propeller from the engine in the event of an obstacle being struck.

== Operational history ==
=== United States ===
Embry-Riddle Aeronautical University provided the Academy Flight Screening (AFS) program for the United States Air Force Academy in DA20-C1 Falcons, which were specially ordered with slightly smaller fuel tanks to save weight and primary flight instruments on the right side of the aircraft. Embry-Riddle operated a fleet of DA-20s at the Academy. The AFS program was discontinued in 2007.

Doss Aviation, under contract for the United States Air Force, currently operates a fleet of DA-20s at the Pueblo Memorial Airport in the Initial Flight Training (IFT) program. Potential USAF Pilots, Combat Systems Officers, and RPA pilots that do not have a private pilot's license must go through the Doss screening program and receive time in the DA20 before going on to their respective training programs.

== Variants ==
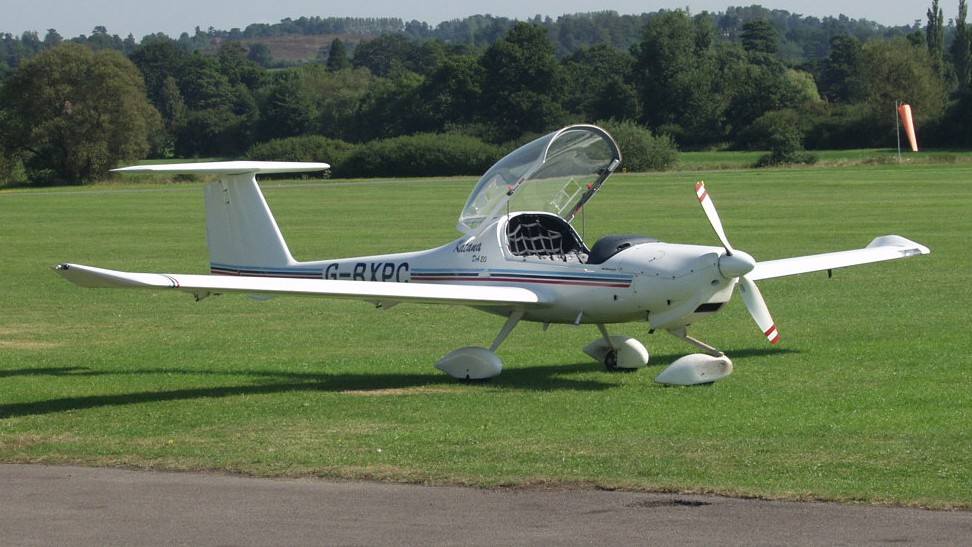
A DA-20A-1 in 2002

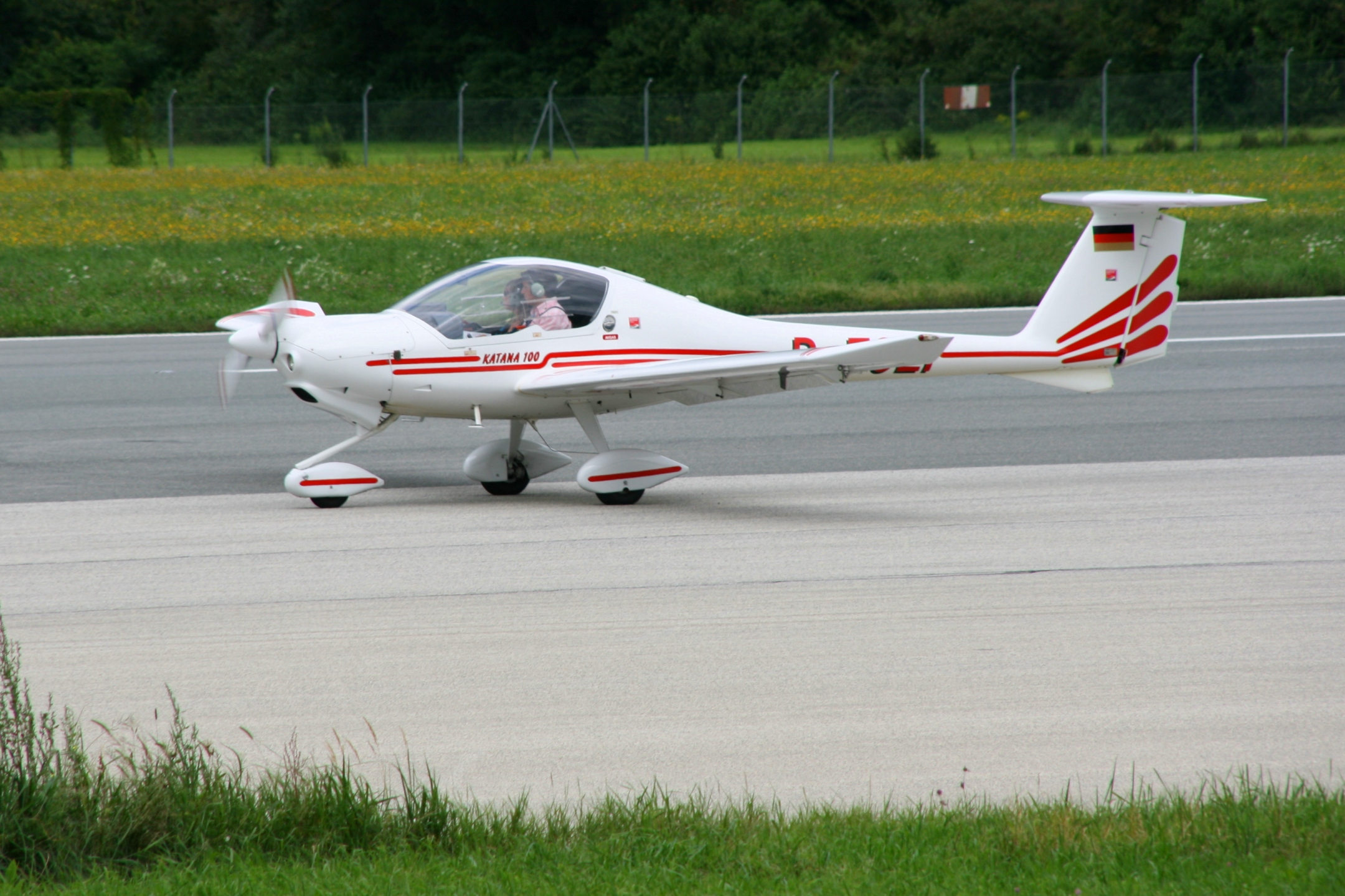
Katana 100 in 2008

DV20-A1 Katana
Austrian-built development of the Diamond HK36 Super Dimona motorglider, powered by an 80 hp (60 kW) Rotax 912 and certified in 1993.

DA20-A1 Katana
Canadian-built DV20. Powered by an 80 hp (60 kW) Rotax 912 and introduced in 1995.

DA20-100 Katana 100
Factory refurbished and re-engined Katana for the European market. Powered by a 100 hp (75 kW) Rotax 912S. Introduced in 1999.

DA20-C1 Katana and Katana Eclipse
Name used in marketing and some 1998 year model planes. The name "Katana" was actually painted on some planes. Powered by a 125 hp (93 kW) Continental IO-240 engine. In order to accommodate the extra 70 pounds of the IO-240, the Katana's battery was moved behind the baggage bay, to help move the empty cg aft, and the wing sweep has been changed from 1 degree aft to just 0.5 degrees back to shift the center of lift forward. Previous Katanas had simple hinged flaps – but at the higher maximum weight, more sophisticated slotted flaps were necessary to bring the stall speed to the JAR-VLA-specified 45 knots.

DA20-C1 Evolution
Stripped down C1, intended for flight schools as a trainer. No rear windows. Powered by a 125 hp (93 kW) Continental IO-240-B engine.

DA20-C1 Eclipse
Better equipped C1 for private use, with rear windows for better visibility. Powered by a 125 hp (93 kW) Continental IO-240-B engine Entered production in 1999.

DA20-C1 Falcon
Military trainer version. Powered by a 125 hp (93 kW) Continental IO-240-B engine. Instruments moved in front of the right seat, where the student sits, which places the stick in the student's right hand and throttle in the left, in a similar arrangement to fighter aircraft. Also equipped with a smaller fuel tank. Some Embry-Riddle Falcons have been sold to private owners and flight schools after being fitted with standard instrument panels and fuel tanks.

DA20i Katana

Marketing name for 2026 the DV20-E variant produced in Austria. Powered by a 100hp (73,5 kW) Rotax 912iSc3 Sport equipped with an mt-propeller 2-blade MTV-21A/175-05 constant speed propeller. It features a Garmin G500Txi as standard and a digital engine monitoring system.

== Operators ==
=== Civil ===
The DA20 is popular with flight training schools and is also operated by private individuals. Moncton Flight College in New Brunswick, Canada operates a fleet of 45 Diamond DA20-C1 Eclipses.

=== Military ===
Ecuador

- Ecuadorian Air Force – 20 X DA20C1s (for delivery in 2012)

Poland

- Polish Air Force – 10 X DA20 C-1 Eclipse

== Specifications (DA20-C1 Eclipse) ==
Data from DA20 webpage

General characteristics

- Crew: one
- Capacity: one passenger
- Length: 7.16 m (23 ft 6 in)
- Wingspan: 10.87 m (35 ft 8 in)
- Height: 2.18 m (7 ft 2 in)
- Empty weight: 528 kg (1,164 lb)
- Gross weight: 800 kg (1,764 lb)
- Fuel capacity: 24 U.S. gallons (91 L; 20 imp gal)
- Powerplant: 1 × Continental IO-240-B3B four cylinder horizontally opposed piston aircraft engine, 93 kW (125 hp)
- Propellers: 2-bladed Sensenich Propeller fixed pitch

Performance

- Cruise speed: 256 km/h (159 mph, 138 kn)
- Stall speed: 83 km/h (52 mph, 45 kn)
- Range: 1,013 km (629 mi, 547 nmi) with 30 minute reserve
- Service ceiling: 4,000 m (13,120 ft)
- Rate of climb: 5.1 m/s (1,000 ft/min)

Avionics

- Garmin GNC 420W GPS/COM
- Garmin GTX 327 transponder with blind altitude encoder
- PS Engineering PM 1000 Intercom

== See also ==
Related lists

- List of military aircraft of the United States
