= Rans S-20 Raven =

S-20 Raven
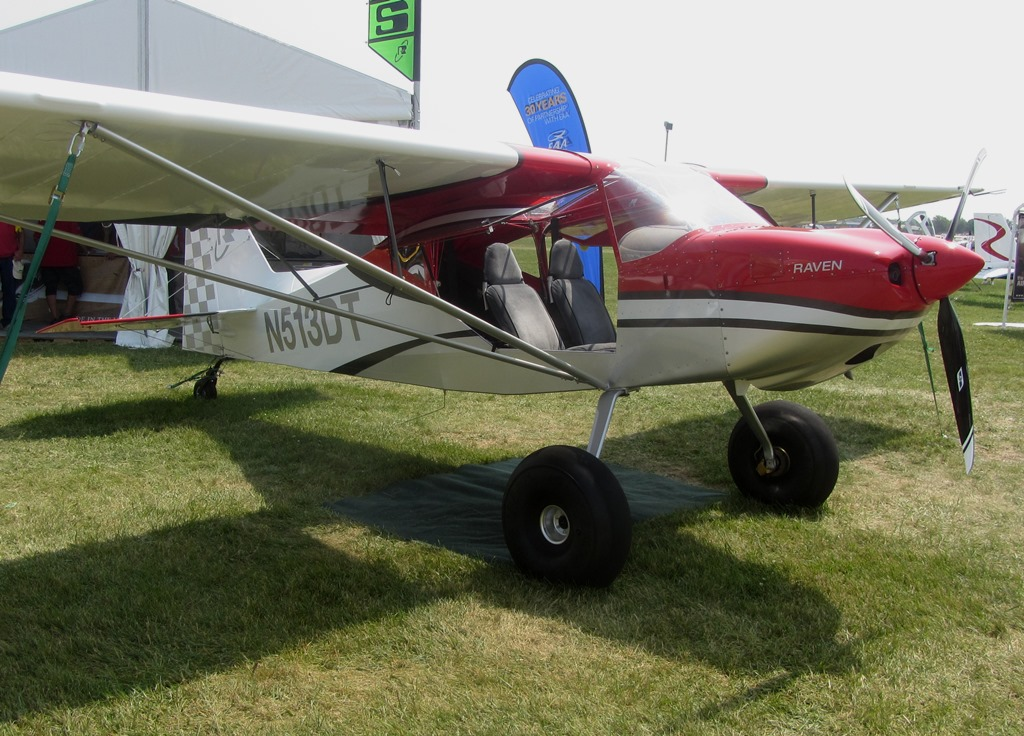
- RANS S-20 Raven

General information
- Type: Homebuilt aircraft, Light-sport aircraft
- National origin: United States
- Manufacturer: Rans Designs
- Designer: Randy Schlitter
- Status: In production (2015)

History
- Introduction date: August 2013
- Developed from: Rans S-6 Coyote II; Rans S-7 Courier

The Rans S-20 Raven is an American homebuilt aircraft that was designed by Randy Schlitter and is produced by Rans Designs of Hays, Kansas, introduced at AirVenture in August 2013. The aircraft is supplied as a kit for amateur construction and it is anticipated that it will later be offered as a complete ready-to-fly-aircraft in the light-sport aircraft category.

== Design and development ==
The S-20 combines features from the Rans S-6 Coyote II and Rans S-7 Courier models. It differs from the S-6 in having the whole fuselage made from welded 4130 steel tubing and not just the cockpit cage and it uses the S-7's wings.

The aircraft features a strut-braced high-wing, a two-seats-in-side-by-side configuration enclosed cockpit accessed via bowed-out top-hinged doors to give increased shoulder room, fixed conventional landing gear or optionally tricycle landing gear made from 7075 aluminum with wheel pants and a single engine in tractor configuration.

The aircraft fuselage is made from welded 4130 steel tubing, while the wings are of aluminum construction, with all surfaces covered in doped aircraft fabric. Its 30.25 ft (9.2 m) span wing mounts flaps, has a wing area of 152.7 sq ft (14.19 m^{2}) and is supported by "V" struts with jury struts. The cabin has a width of 46 in (120 cm) and features a large overhead skylight. The acceptable power range is 100 to 160 hp (75 to 119 kW) and the standard engines used are the 100 hp (75 kW) Rotax 912ULS or the 130 hp (97 kW) ULPower UL350iS powerplant.

The aircraft has a typical empty weight of 740 lb (340 kg) and a gross weight of 1,320 lb (600 kg), giving a useful load of 580 lb (260 kg). With full fuel of 26 U.S. gallons (98 L; 22 imp gal) the payload for the pilot, passenger and baggage is 424 lb (192 kg).

The manufacturer estimates the construction time from the supplied kit as 500–700 hours, with kits forecast to commence shipping in February 2014. A ready-to-fly LSA version is expected to be on the market by late 2015 at a cost of about US$120,000.

== Operational history ==
In January 2014 one example was registered in the United States with the Federal Aviation Administration, although a total of two had been registered at one time.

== Specifications (S-20 Raven taildragger) ==
Data from AVweb and Rans

General characteristics

- Crew: one
- Capacity: one passenger
- Length: 21 ft 0 in (6.40 m)
- Wingspan: 30 ft 3 in (9.22 m)
- Height: 6 ft 7 in (2.01 m)
- Empty weight: 740 lb (336 kg)
- Gross weight: 1,320 lb (599 kg)
- Fuel capacity: 26 U.S. gallons (98 L; 22 imp gal)
- Powerplant: 1 × Rotax 912ULS four cylinder, air and liquid-cooled, four stroke aircraft engine, 100 hp (75 kW)
- Propellers: 2-bladed Warp Drive Inc ground adjustable, 5 ft 10 in (1.78 m) diameter

Performance

- Cruise speed: 112 mph (180 km/h, 97 kn)
- Stall speed: 33 mph (53 km/h, 29 kn) flaps down
- Never exceed speed: 130 mph (210 km/h, 110 kn)
- Range: 582 mi (937 km, 506 nmi)
- Endurance: 5.2 hours
- Service ceiling: 14,500 ft (4,400 m)
- g limits: +4/-2
- Maximum glide ratio: 9.4:1
- Rate of climb: 900 ft/min (4.6 m/s)
- Wing loading: 8.64 lb/sq ft (42.2 kg/m^{2})
