= Rans Coyote =

Rans Coyote can refer to a number of different aircraft:

- Rans S-4 Coyote
- Rans S-5 Coyote
- Rans S-6 Coyote II
