= Hot pursuit (disambiguation) =

Hot pursuit is a legal term.

Hot Pursuit may also refer to:

== Film and television ==
- Hot Pursuit (1984 TV series), an NBC television series
- Hot Pursuit (2006 TV series), a Court TV television series
- Hot Pursuit (1987 film), an American action comedy film starring John Cusack
- Hot Pursuit (2015 film), an American comedy film starring Reese Witherspoon and Sofía Vergara
- "Hot Pursuit", a 2000 episode of Frasier

== Video games ==
- Need for Speed III: Hot Pursuit, a racing video game, by EA Canada, released in 1998
- Need for Speed: Hot Pursuit 2, the sequel, by EA Black Box, released in 2002
- Need for Speed: Hot Pursuit, by Criterion Games, released in 2010

== Other uses ==
- Hot Pursuit, a DC Comics character who is a future version of Barry Allen (Flash)
- Zootopia: Hot Pursuit, a trackless dark ride in Shanghai Disneyland

== See also ==
- "Hot Fursuit", a track from Zootopia 2's soundtrack.
- Need for Speed: Hot Pursuit (disambiguation)
- Pursuit (disambiguation)
- Hot (disambiguation)
