= Rans S-10 Sakota =

S-10 Sakota
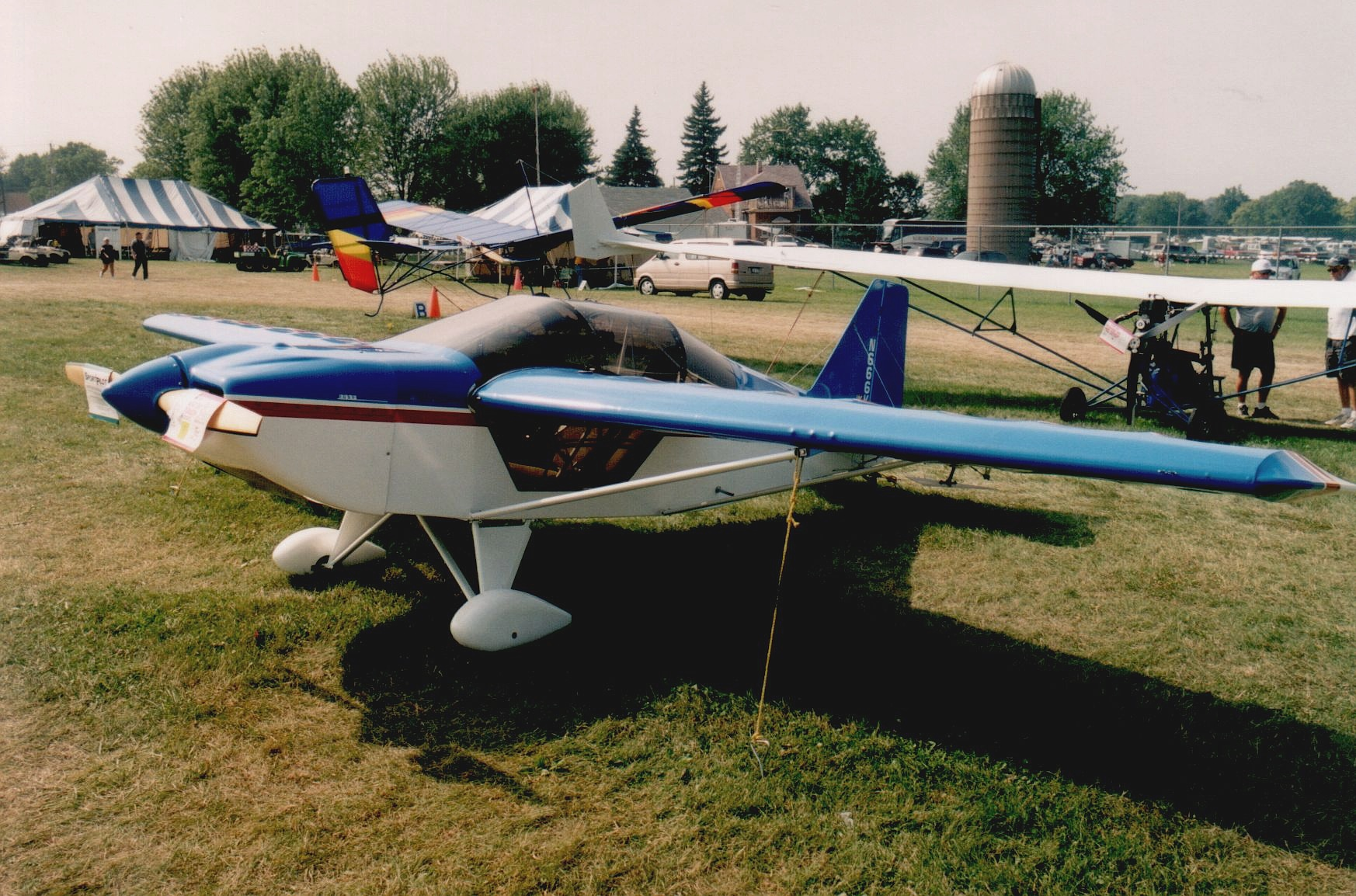

General information
- Type: Kit aircraft
- National origin: United States
- Manufacturer: Rans Inc
- Designer: Randy Schlitter
- Status: In production
- Number built: 215 (2011)

History
- Manufactured: 1988–2006, 2009–present
- Introduction date: 1988
- First flight: March 1988
- Developed from: Rans S-9 Chaos

The Rans S-10 Sakota is an American single-engined, tractor configuration, two-seats in side-by-side configuration, mid-wing monoplane designed by Randy Schlitter for aerobatics and manufactured by Rans Inc. The Sakota is available in kit form for amateur construction.

Production of the S-10 was ended as part of Rans' extensive reorganization of its product line on 1 June 2006, after having been available for 18 years, but the S-10 was reintroduced in about 2009 and is again available.

== Design and development ==
The S-9 Chaos was designed by Randy Schlitter in 1986 as an inexpensive single-seat aerobatic aircraft for sportsman competition aerobatics and advanced aerobatics if inverted fuel and oil systems are installed. The S-10 Sakota was designed two years later, in 1988, as a two-seat version of the S-9 that can conduct aerobatics when flown solo or fly cross country with two occupants.

Like many Rans models, the S-10 features a welded 4130 steel tube cockpit, with a bolted aluminum tube rear fuselage. All fuselage, wing and tail surfaces are covered in dope and fabric. The reported construction time is 600 man-hours.

The Sakota has conventional landing gear. The basic engine is the Rotax 582 of 64 hp (48 kW) and the Rotax 912UL of 80 hp (60 kW) and the Rotax 912ULS of 100 hp (75 kW) available as options.

== Operational history ==
There were 215 S-10s built and flown by December 2011.

In November 2010 there were 42 S-10s registered in the United States, along with six registered in Canada and 12 in the UK. Another 58 were on the registers of European countries west of Russia.

== Specifications (S-10) ==
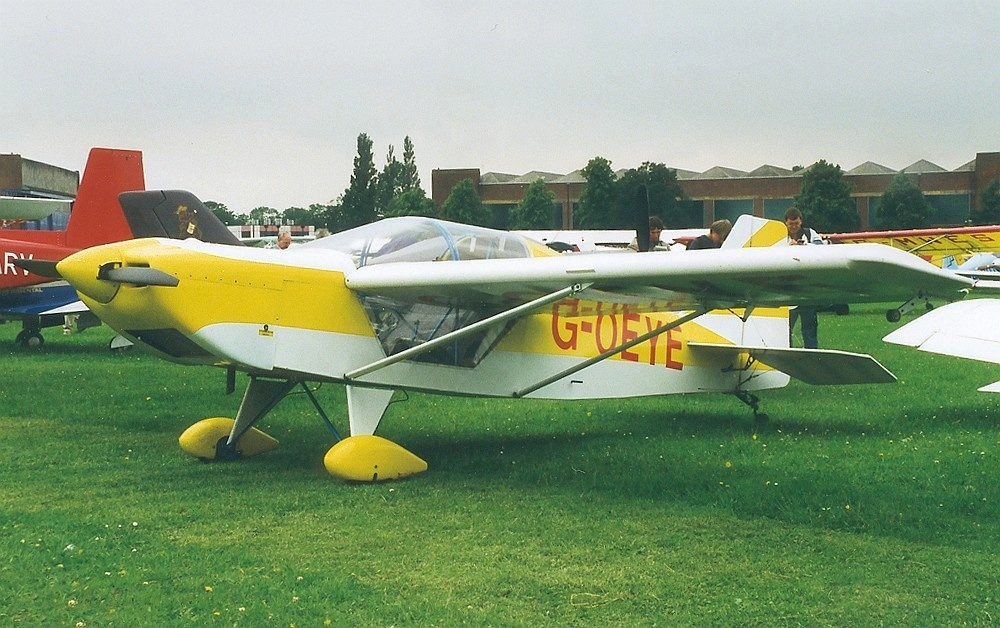
Rans S-10 Sakota

Data from Rans website

General characteristics

- Crew: One
- Capacity: one passenger
- Length: 17 ft 10 in (5.44 m)
- Wingspan: 24 ft 0 in (7.32 m)
- Height: 4 ft 10 in (1.47 m)
- Wing area: 95 sq ft (8.8 m^{2})
- Aspect ratio: 4.23:1
- Empty weight: 460 lb (209 kg)
- Gross weight: 960 lb (435 kg)
- Fuel capacity: 18 US gallons (68 litres)
- Powerplant: 1 × Rotax 582 , 64 hp (48 kW)
- Propellers: 2-bladed wooden, 5 ft 10 in (1.78 m) diameter

Performance

- Cruise speed: 110 mph (180 km/h, 96 kn)
- Stall speed: 45 mph (72 km/h, 39 kn)
- Never exceed speed: 130 mph (210 km/h, 110 kn)
- Range: 341 mi (549 km, 296 nmi)
- Endurance: 3.1 hrs
- Service ceiling: 12,500 ft (3,800 m)
- g limits: +4/-2 at max gross weight and +6/-4 at 670lbs.
- Roll rate: 100 degrees/sec
- Maximum glide ratio: 7:1
- Rate of climb: 800 ft/min (4.1 m/s)
- Wing loading: 10.1 lb/sq ft (49 kg/m^{2})

Avionics

- none

== See also ==
Aircraft of comparable role, configuration, and era

- Murphy Renegade
- Pitts Special
