= Rans S-12 Airaile =

Rans S-12 Airaile family
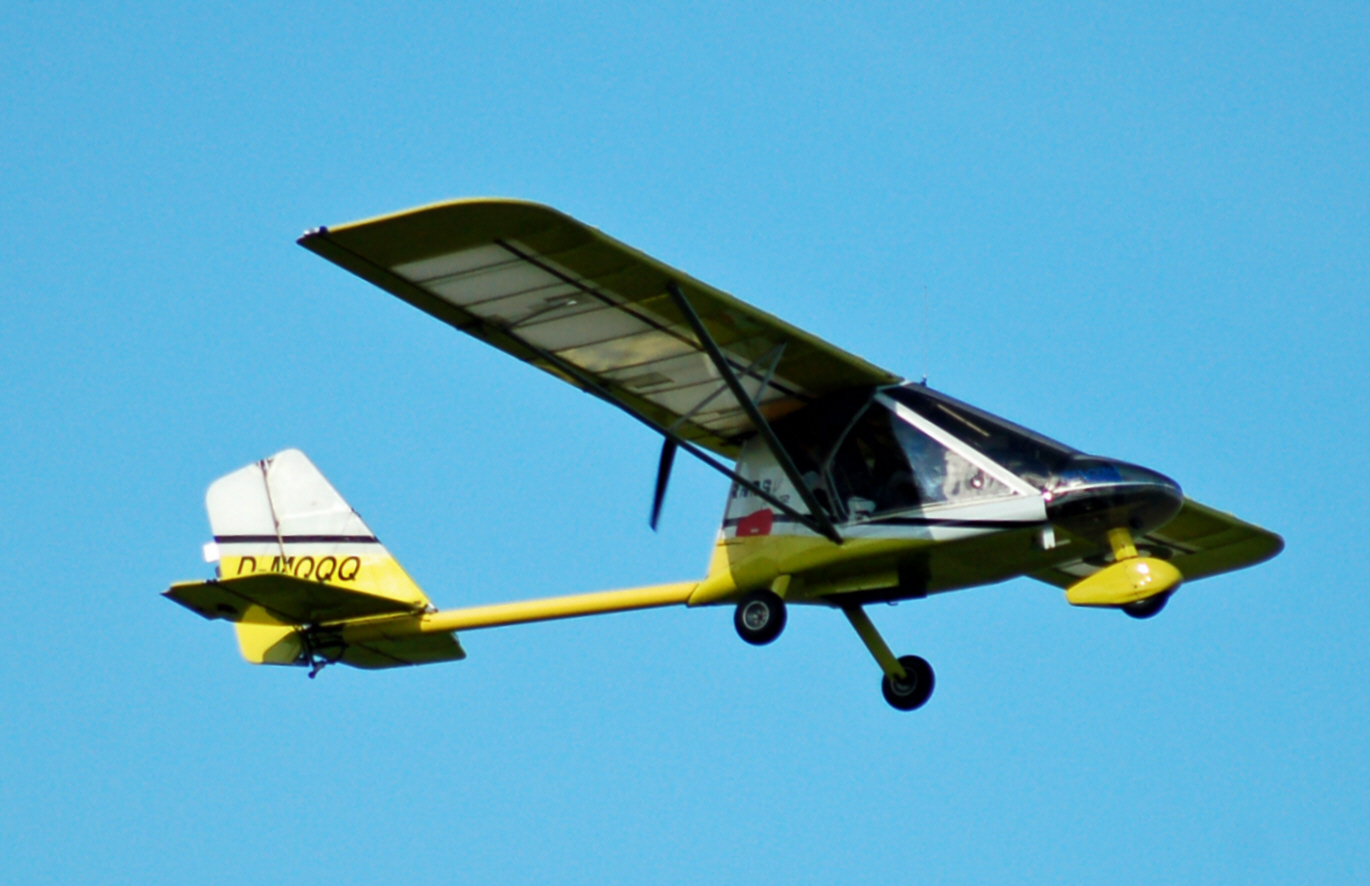
- Rans S-12 Airaile

General information
- Type: Kit aircraft
- National origin: United States
- Manufacturer: Rans Inc
- Designer: Randy Schlitter
- Status: S-12XL in production
- Number built: 1112 (S-12 models, 2011)

History
- Manufactured: 1990-present
- Introduction date: March 1990

The Rans S-12 Airaile is a family of related American single-engined, pusher configuration, high-wing monoplanes designed by Randy Schlitter and manufactured by Rans Inc. The aircraft are available in kit form for amateur construction.

Production of the S-12S Airaile, S-14 Airaile, S-17 Stinger and S-18 Stinger II was ended as part of Rans' extensive reorganization of its product line on 1 June 2006. The S-12XL Airaile was originally intended to be cut from the line at the same time, but customer demand convinced the company to retain the model. As of 2015, the model is still available as a special order.

== Design and development ==
The S-12 Airaile was designed by Randy Schlitter and introduced in March 1990 as a two-seat side-by-side, tricycle gear ultralight aircraft for recreational and flight training use. The single-seat version of the S-12, the S-14 Airaile, was designed one year later and entered production in 1991. The S-17 Stinger retains the wings, tail, boom tube of the S-14, mated to new forward 4130 steel tube cockpit and equipped with conventional landing gear to create an open-cockpit ultralight that complies with the US FAR 103 Ultralight Vehicles regulations. The S-18 Stinger II uses the S-12's wings, tail and boom tube, again with a new forward steel tube fuselage to create a tandem seat, conventional landing gear, open cockpit ultralight trainer.

Like many Rans models, the family features a welded 4130 steel tube cockpit, with a bolted 6061-T6 aluminum tube rear fuselage. All fuselage, wing and tail surfaces are covered in Dacron or, on some models, dope and fabric. The wings are built from aluminium tube and ribs, feature flaps, and are folding or removable.

The present-day S-12XL is powered by the Rotax 503 of 50 hp (37 kW), with the Rotax 582 of 64 hp (48 kW), the Rotax 912UL of 80 hp (60 kW) and the Rotax 912UL of 100 hp (75 kW) available as options.

== Operational history ==
The aircraft family has been very well received, with over 1000 S-12s delivered. In 1998 Kitplanes magazine said that the S-14 has "squeaky clean handling feels like a little jet, but lands like an ultralight".

== Variants ==
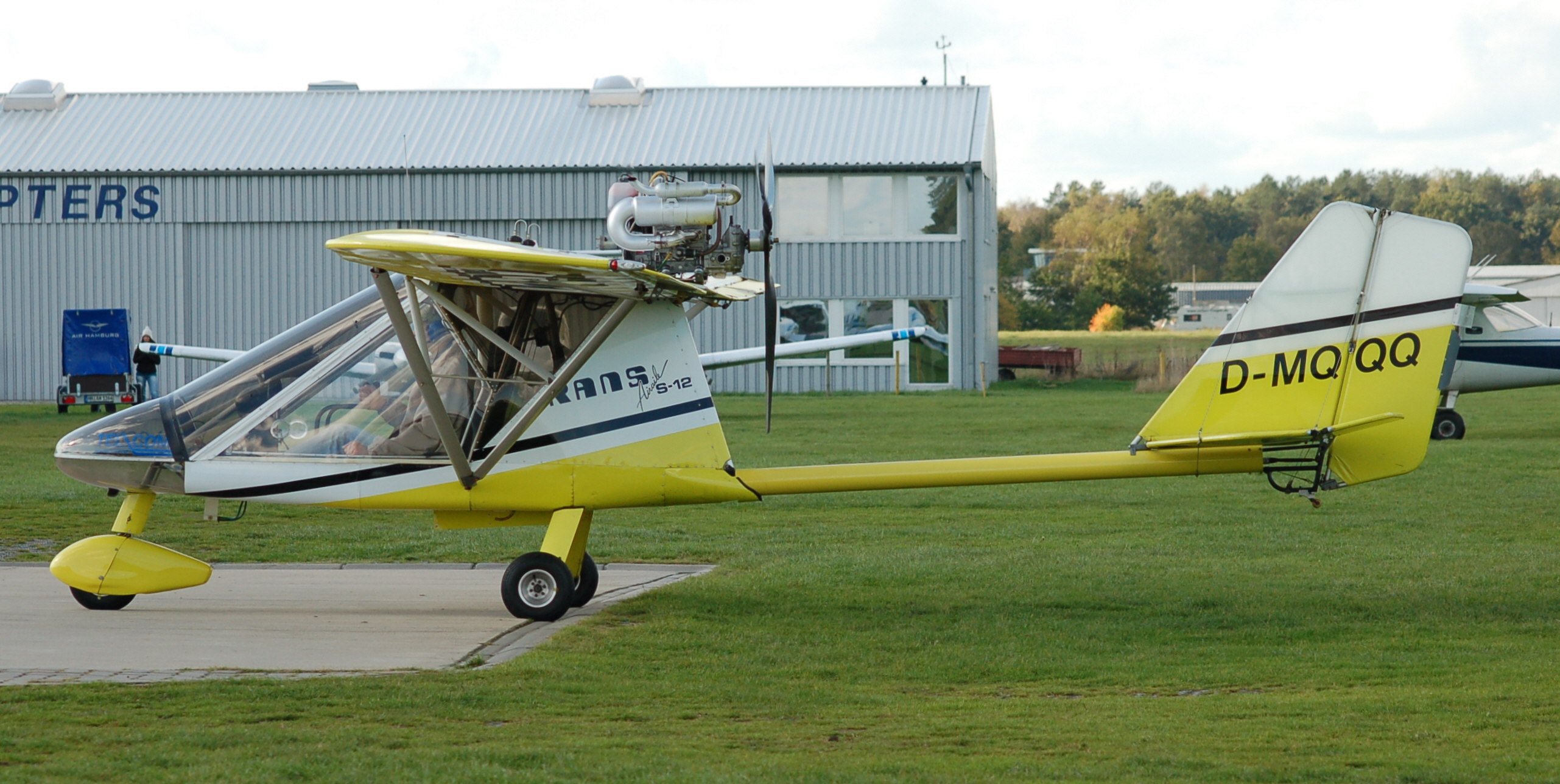
Rans S-12 Airaile

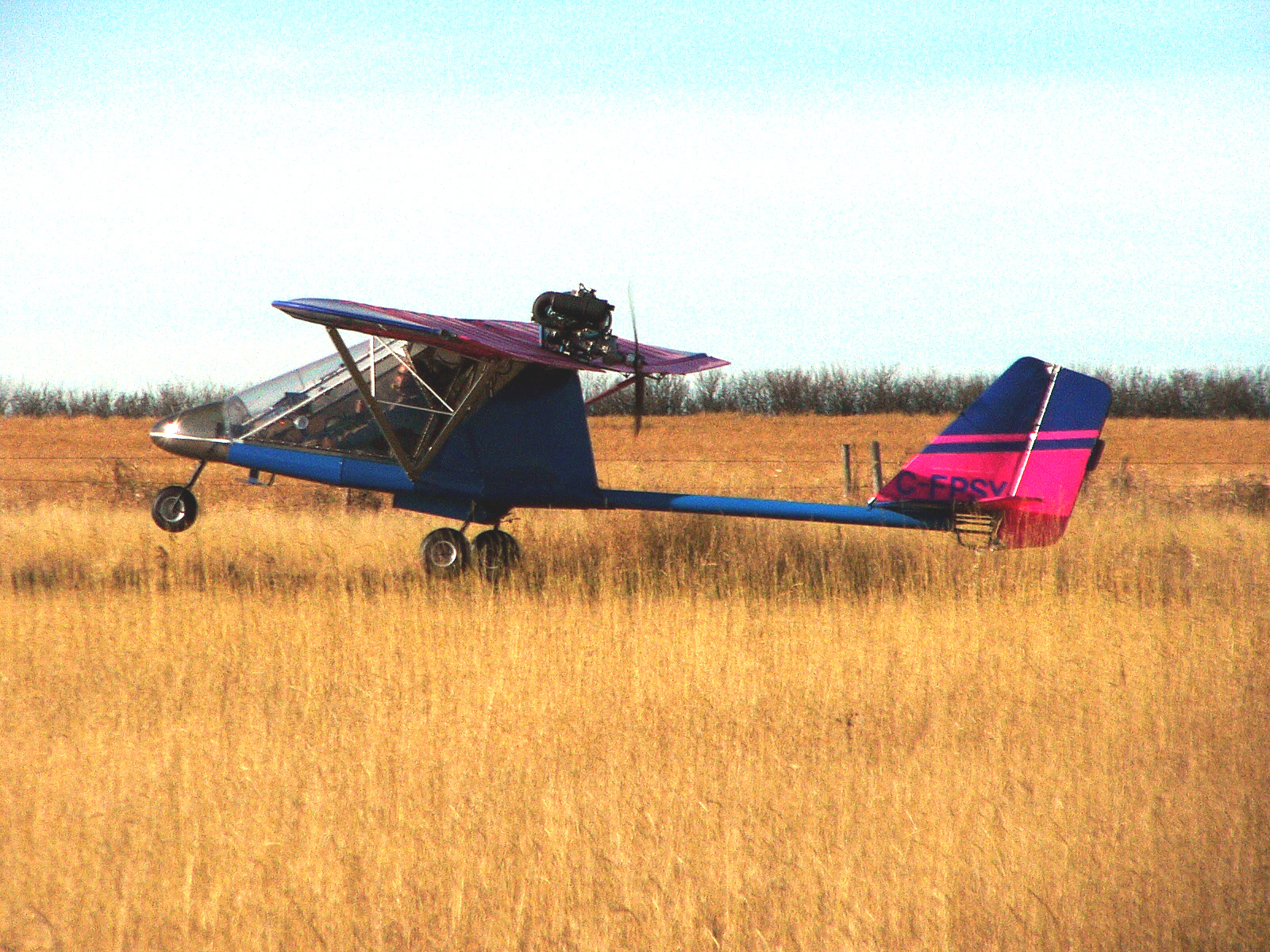
Rans S-12 Airaile landing

S-12 Airaile
Original model. Production completed.
S-12S Super Airaile
Similar to XL, but with dope and fabric covering. Production completed.
S-12XL Airaile
Current production model, two seats in side-by-side configuration, Dacron covering. Full cockpit fairing is optional. Estimate construction time 175 man-hours without the full enclosure or 300 with it. Standard engine is the Rotax 503 of 50 hp (37 kW), with the Rotax 582 of 64 hp (48 kW), the Rotax 912UL of 80 hp (60 kW) or the Rotax 912ULS of 100 hp (75 kW) optional. Can be equipped with floats. Over 1000 S-12s of all versions delivered and flown in more than 40 countries.
S-14 Airaile
Single-seat version of the S-12, with Dacron covering introduced in 1991. Standard engine was the Rotax 447 of 40 hp (30 kW), with the Rotax 503 of 50 hp (37 kW) and the Rotax 582 of 64 hp (48 kW) optional. Reported construction time 200 man-hours including complete cockpit fairing. Empty weight of 390 lb (177 kg) places the S-14 above the maximum category weight of the US FAR 103 Ultralight Vehicles category. Production completed with 125 completed by December 2004.
S-17 Stinger
Open-cockpit, conventional landing gear, single-seater, equipped with a standard Rotax 447 of 40 hp (30 kW) with the Rotax 503 of 50 hp (37 kW) optional. Empty weight of 249 lb (113 kg) places the S-17 within weight of the US FAR 103 Ultralight Vehicles category. The aircraft uses the wings, tailboom and tail of the S-14, but is fitted with a new steel tube cockpit structure. While it retains the flap-equipped wing of the S-14, the flaps are fixed. Production completed with 38 completed by December 2004.
S-18 Stinger II
Open-cockpit, conventional landing gear, ultralight trainer with two seats in tandem, standard engine is the Rotax 503 of 50 hp (37 kW) with the Rotax 582 of 64 hp (48 kW), 80 hp (60 kW) or the Rotax 912UL of 100 hp (75 kW) optional. The aircraft uses the wings, tailboom and tail of the S-12XL, but is fitted with a new steel tube cockpit structure. Production completed, with 30 completed by December 2004.

== Specifications (S-12XL) ==
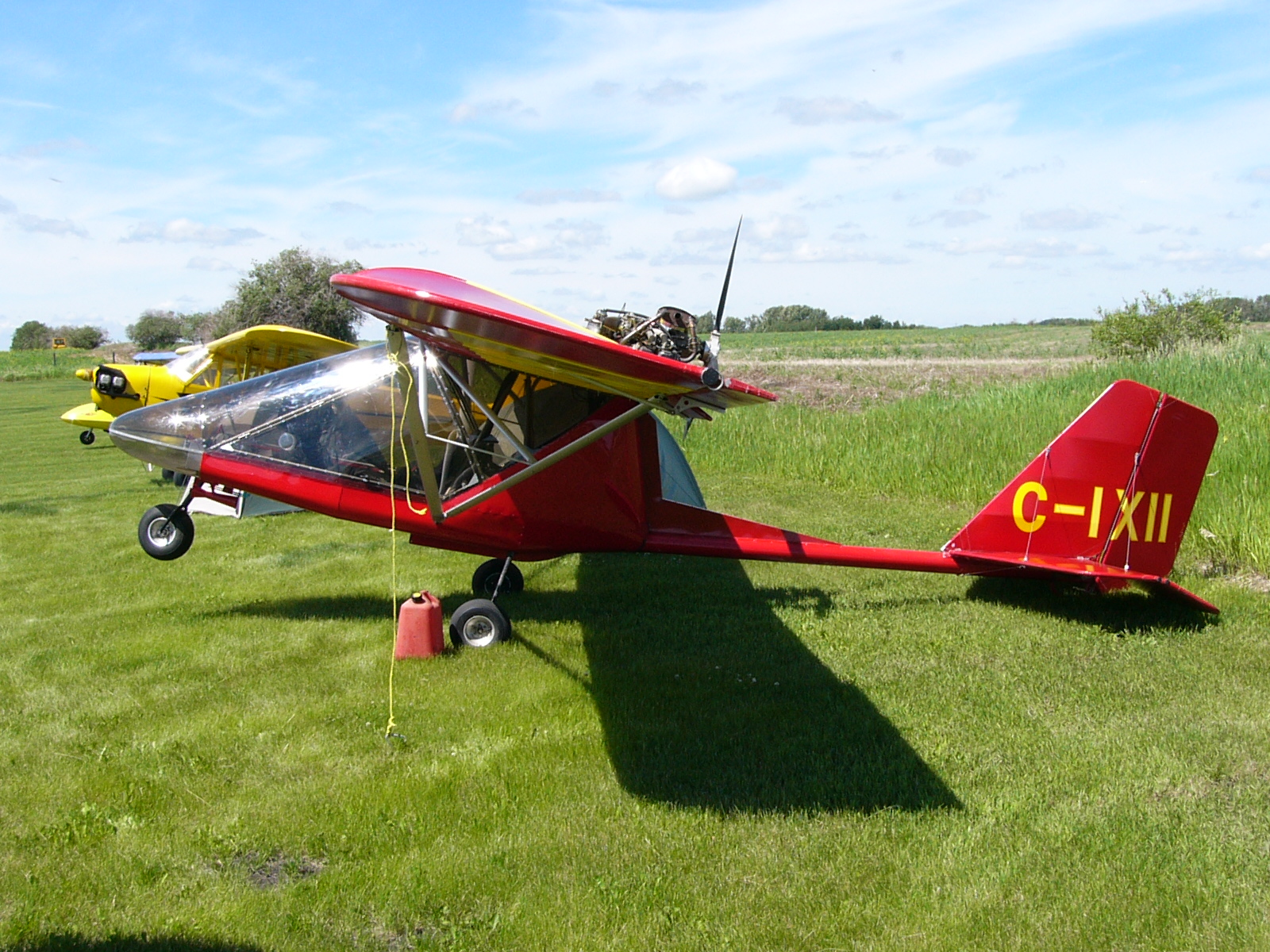
Rans S-12XL Airaile. The tricycle gear aircraft sits on its tail when unoccupied.

Data from Rans website

General characteristics

- Crew: one
- Capacity: one passenger
- Length: 21 ft 8 in (6.60 m)
- Wingspan: 31 ft 0 in (9.45 m)
- Height: 7 ft 4 in (2.24 m)
- Wing area: 152 sq ft (14.1 m^{2})
- Aspect ratio: 6.33:1
- Empty weight: 475 lb (215 kg)
- Gross weight: 975 lb (442 kg)
- Fuel capacity: 18 US gallons (68 litres)
- Powerplant: 1 × Rotax 582 , 64 hp (48 kW)
- Propellers: 2-bladed wooden, 5 ft 8 in (1.73 m) diameter

Performance

- Cruise speed: 75 mph (121 km/h, 65 kn)
- Stall speed: 32 mph (51 km/h, 28 kn) flaps down
- Never exceed speed: 100 mph (160 km/h, 87 kn)
- Range: 333 mi (536 km, 289 nmi)
- Endurance: 3.1 hrs
- Service ceiling: 14,000 ft (4,300 m)
- g limits: +4/-2 at max gross weight
- Roll rate: 70 degrees/sec
- Maximum glide ratio: 7:1
- Rate of climb: 900 ft/min (4.6 m/s)
- Wing loading: 6.4 lb/sq ft (31 kg/m^{2})

== See also ==
Aircraft of comparable role, configuration, and era

- Aero-Works Aerolite 103
- Avid Champion
- Beaujon Enduro
- Birdman Chinook
- CGS Hawk
- Freebird II
- Lockwood Drifter
- Quad City Challenger
- Spectrum Beaver
- Titan Tornado
