= Rans S-7 Courier =

American light aircraft

S-7 Courier
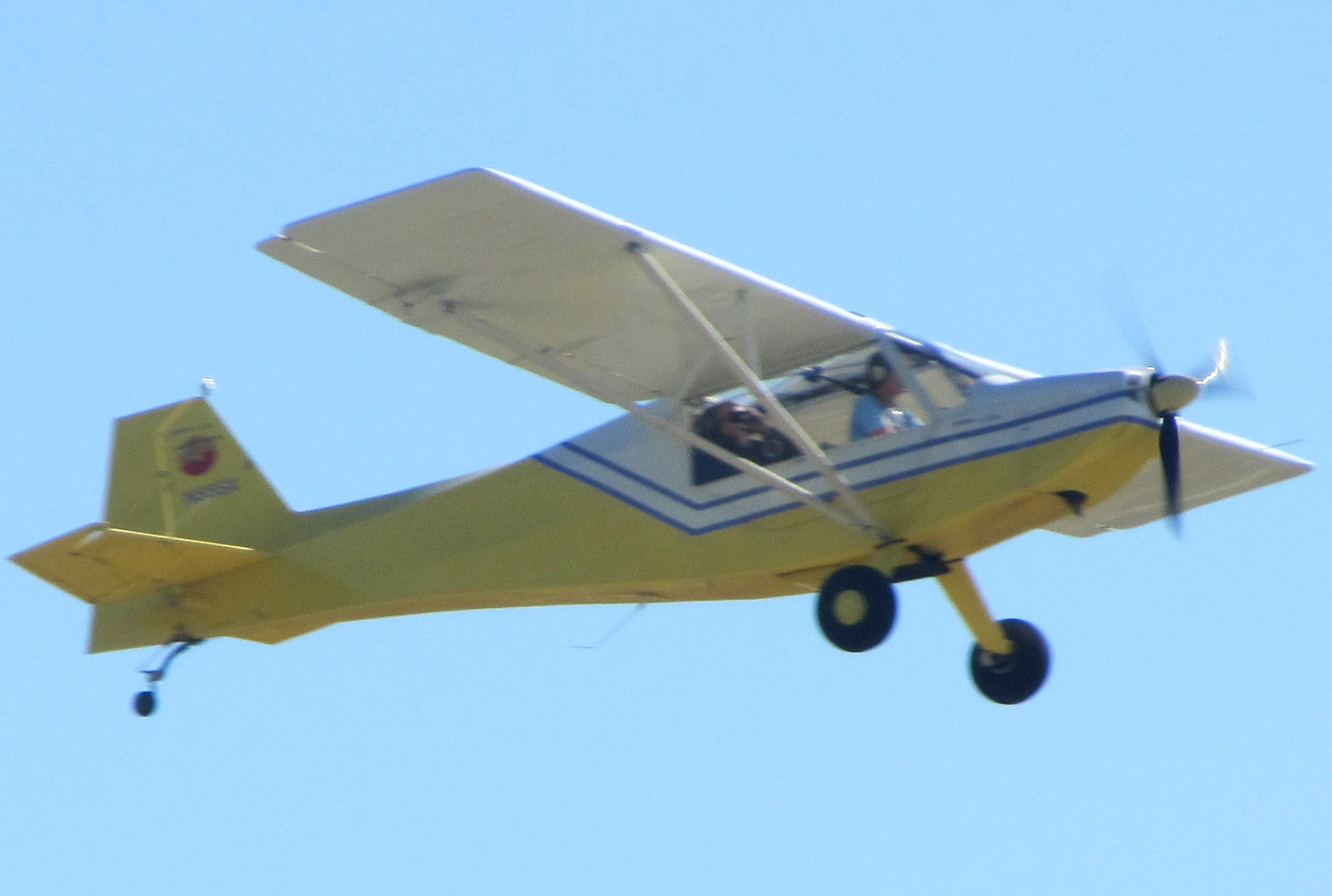

General information
- Type: Kit aircraft
- National origin: United States
- Manufacturer: Rans Inc
- Designer: Randy Schlitter
- Status: In production (2017)
- Number built: 600 (2011)

History
- First flight: November 1985
- Developed from: Rans S-5 Coyote; Rans S-4 Coyote

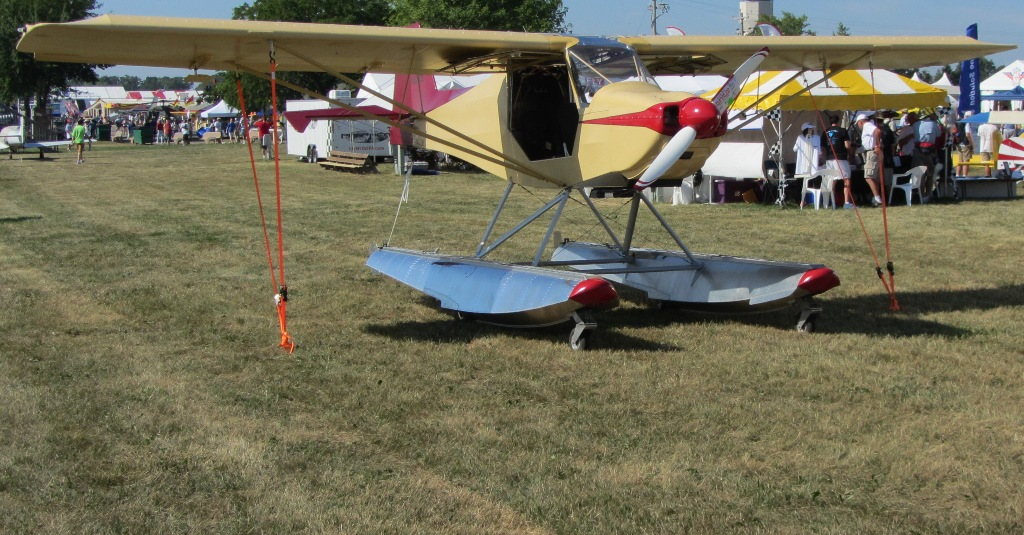
S-7 on floats

The Rans S-7 Courier is an American single-engined, tractor configuration, two-seats in tandem, high-wing monoplane designed by Randy Schlitter and manufactured by Rans Inc. The Courier is available in kit form for amateur construction or as a completed light-sport aircraft.

== Design and development ==
The S-7 was originally conceived of as a trainer for the single seat S-4 Coyote. First flown in November 1985 the Courier was named for an aircraft that Schlitter admired, the Helio Courier.

The S-7 features a welded 4130 steel tube cockpit, with a bolted aluminum tube rear fuselage, wing and tail surfaces all covered in dope and fabric. The reported construction times for the Courier are 500-700 man-hours.

The Courier is available only with conventional landing gear but can be equipped with floats and skis. The original basic engine was the Rotax 503 of 50 hp (37 kW), with the Rotax 582 of 64 hp (48 kW) being available as an option. Today the standard engine is the 100 hp (75 kW) Rotax 912ULS. At least one S7 has been fitted with a Jabiru 2200 flat-four, four-stroke direct-drive engine.

== Operational history ==
325 examples of the Courier had been completed by December 2007. In November 2010 74 were on the registers of European countries west of Russia.

Reviewer Marino Boric said in a 2015 review, that, "this refined little fun flyer...continues to prove itself deservedly popular."

In an extensive review in December 2020, AVweb writer Dave Prizio praised the design's ergonomics and economics, "a nice feature of the S-7 is its ample 30-inch-wide cabin. Even for large people, there is no need to squeeze into an S-7 the way you might into a Cub. It will pretty much do the same thing as a Super Cub at a lower operating cost."

== Variants ==
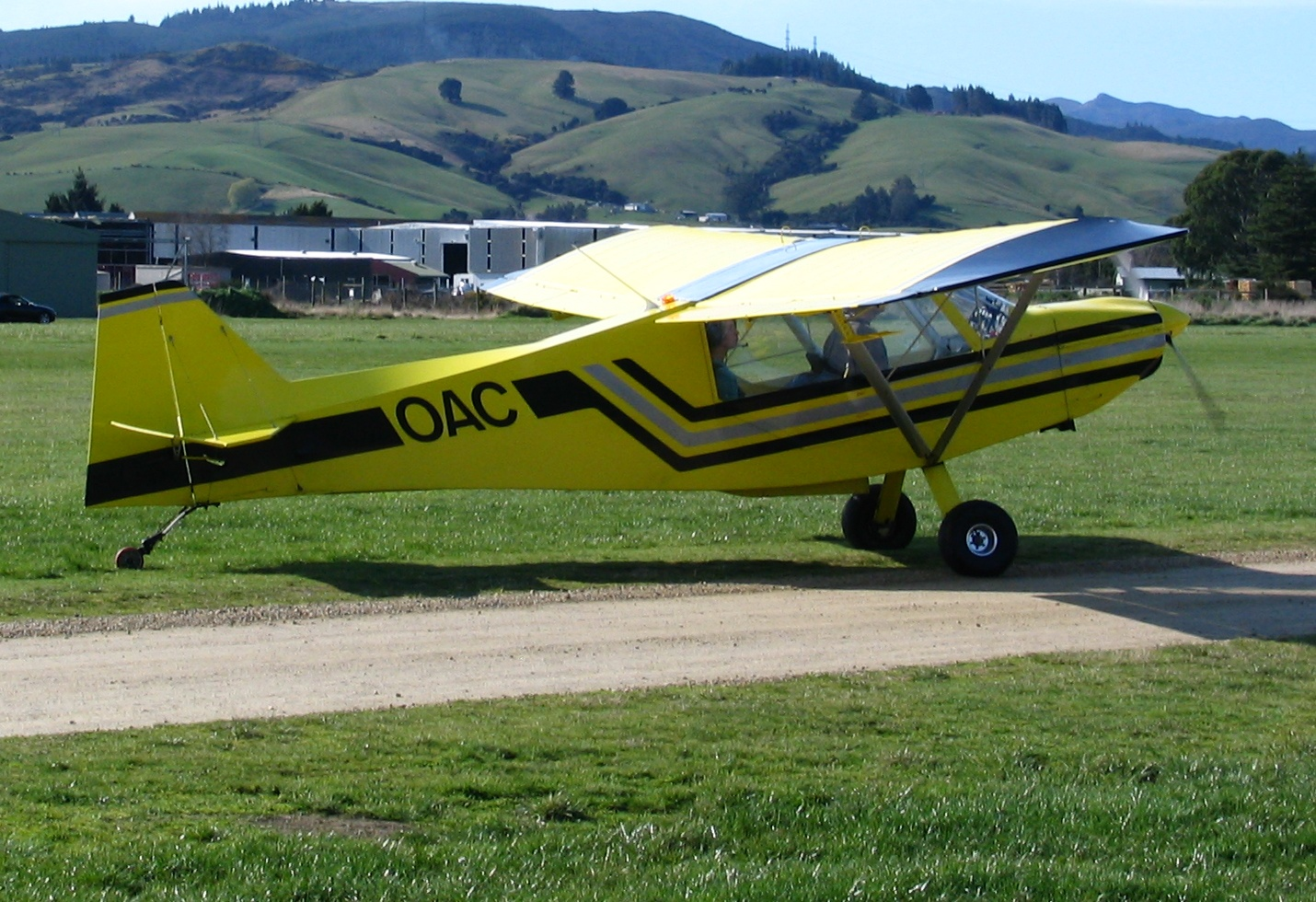
S-7 Courier

S-7
Initial version, standard engine 50 hp (37 kW) Rotax 503, 64 hp (48 kW) Rotax 582 engine optional.

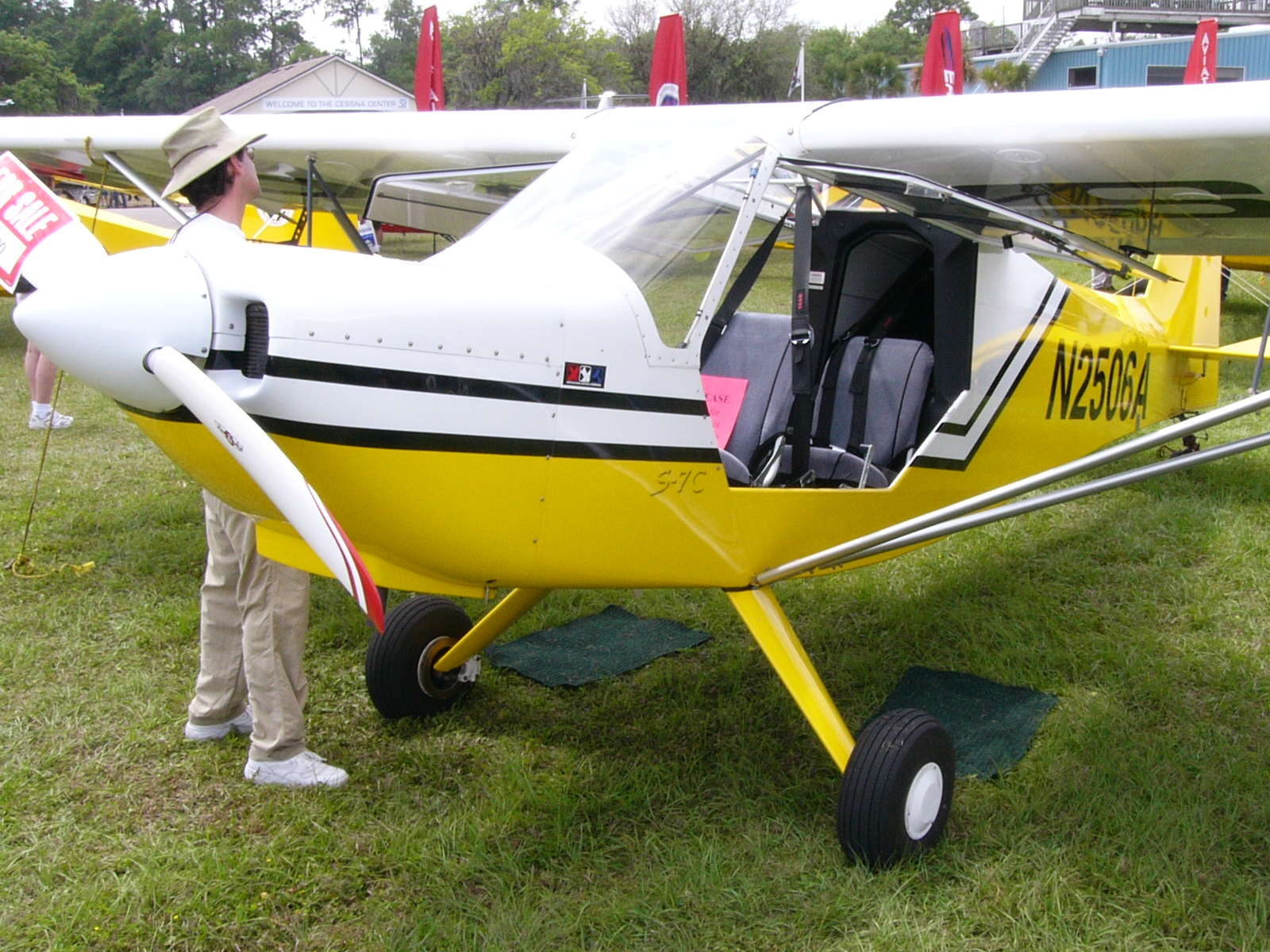
Rans S-7C Courier

S-7C
Refined version introduced in 2001, certified under the US primary category. Certification in the category took seven years of effort by the manufacturer and was not a commercial success as the primary aircraft category was not widely adopted.
S-7S
Kit version of the S-7C, introduced in 2003. Qualifies as a US Experimental light-sport aircraft (ELSA). Standard engine is the 100 hp (75 kW) Rotax 912ULS.
S-7LS
Sold as a factory-assembled ready-to-fly US Special light-sport aircraft, the S-7LS is a factory-assembled version of the S-7S. Standard engine is the 100 hp (75 kW) Rotax 912ULS.

== Specifications (S-7S) ==
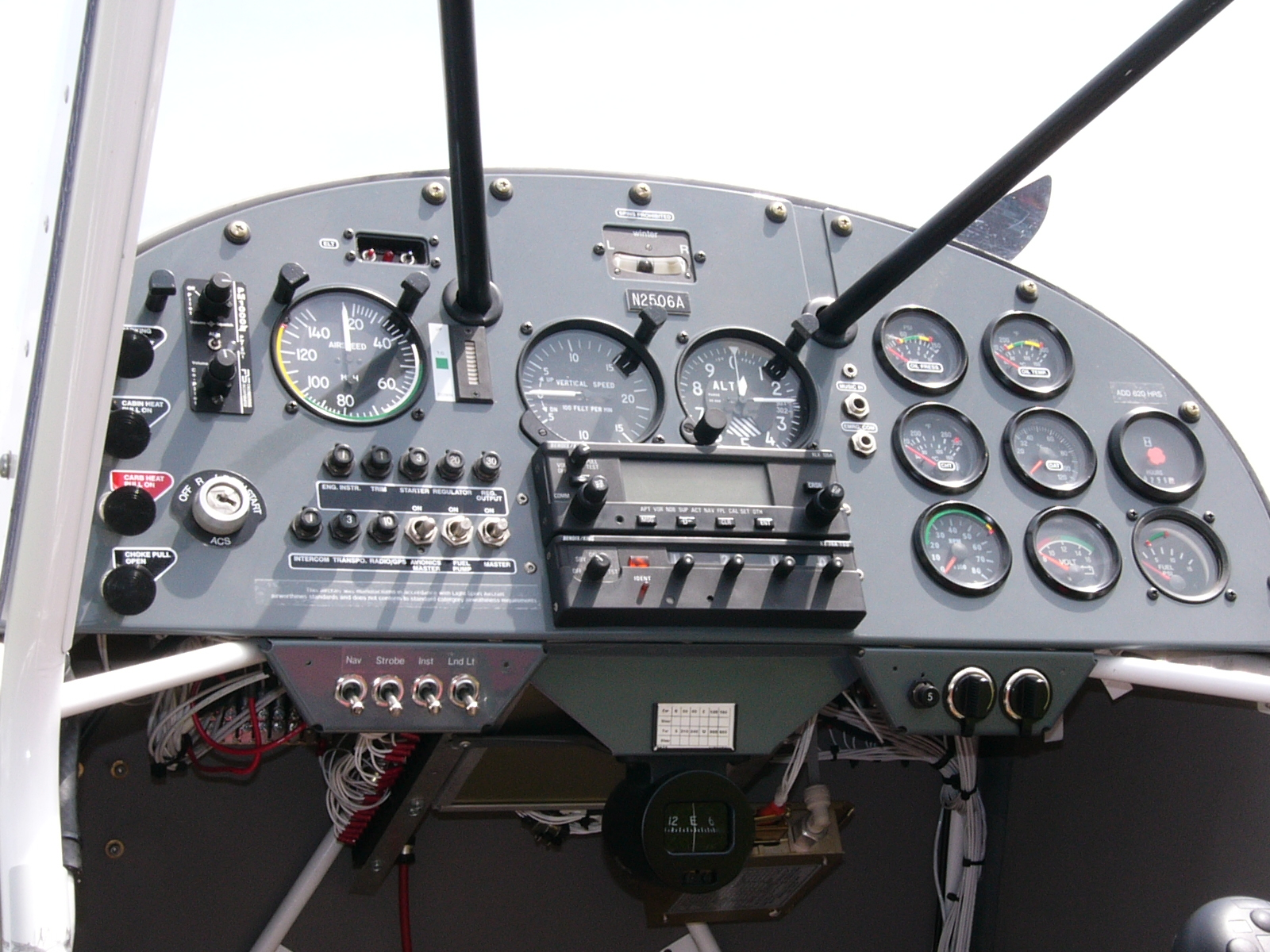
S-7C instrument panel

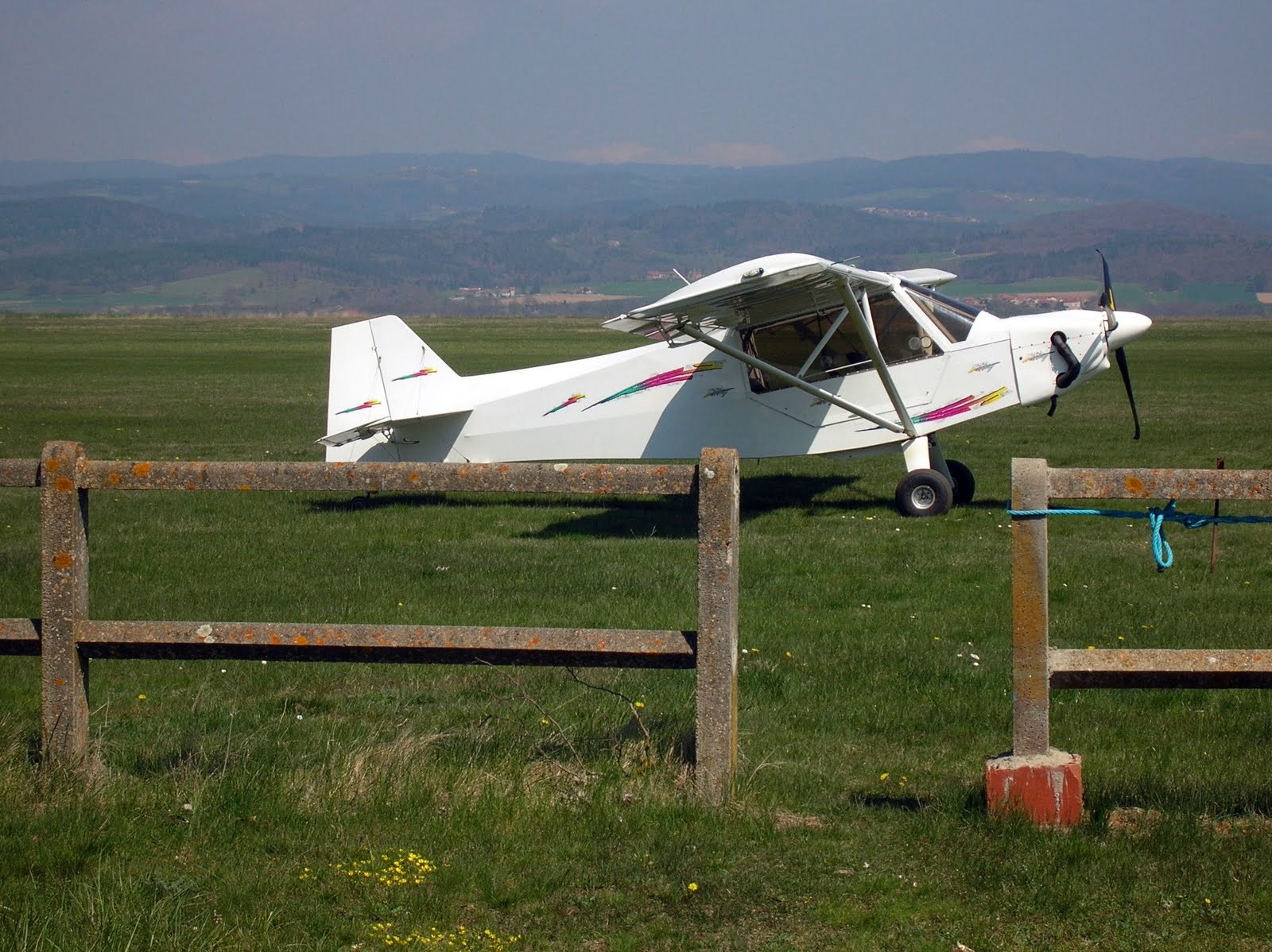
An S-7 at Brioude in France

Data from Kitplanes

General characteristics

- Crew: One
- Capacity: One passenger
- Length: 23 ft 3 in (7.09 m)
- Wingspan: 29 ft 3 in (8.92 m)
- Height: 6 ft 4 in (1.93 m)
- Wing area: 147.1 sq ft (13.67 m^{2})
- Empty weight: 700 lb (318 kg)
- Gross weight: 1,232 lb (559 kg)
- Fuel capacity: 18 US Gallons (68 litres)
- Powerplant: 1 × Rotax 912ULS , 100 hp (75 kW)
- Propellers: 2-bladed adjustable pitch

Performance

- Cruise speed: 118 mph (190 km/h, 103 kn)
- Stall speed: 41 mph (66 km/h, 36 kn)
- Range: 390 mi (630 km, 340 nmi)
- Rate of climb: 1,000 ft/min (5.1 m/s)
- Wing loading: 8.37 lb/sq ft (40.9 kg/m^{2})

== See also ==
Aircraft of comparable role, configuration, and era

- Bellanca Citabria
- Cessna 162
- Denney Kitfox
- Fisher Dakota Hawk
- Fisher Horizon
- Murphy Maverick
- Murphy Rebel
- Piper PA-18
