= Shekari =

Shekari may refer to:

- Rans S-16 Shekari, light aircraft
- Ishaya Shekari, a Nigerian military governor
- Reza Shekari, Iranian footballer
- Shekari, Afghanistan
