= Rans S-19 Venterra =

American light airplane

S-19 Venterra
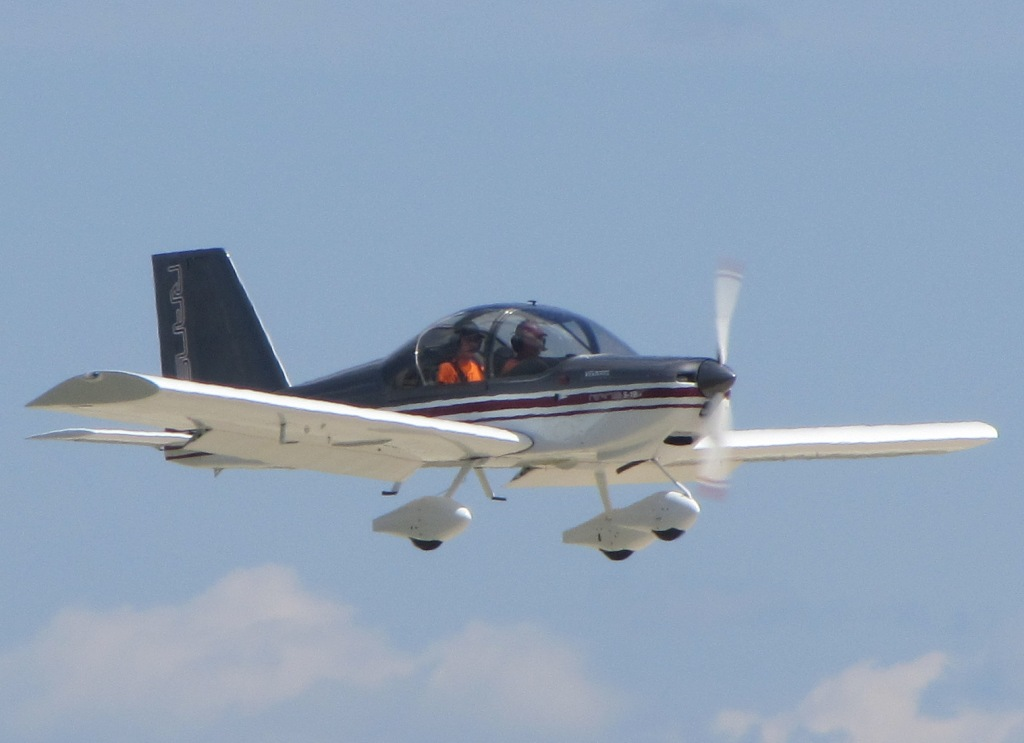
- Rans S-19LS

General information
- Type: Light-sport aircraft
- National origin: United States
- Manufacturer: Rans Inc
- Designer: Randy Schlitter
- Status: In production
- Number built: 23 (2011)

History
- Manufactured: 2008-present
- Introduction date: late 2008
- First flight: 28 Jun 2007

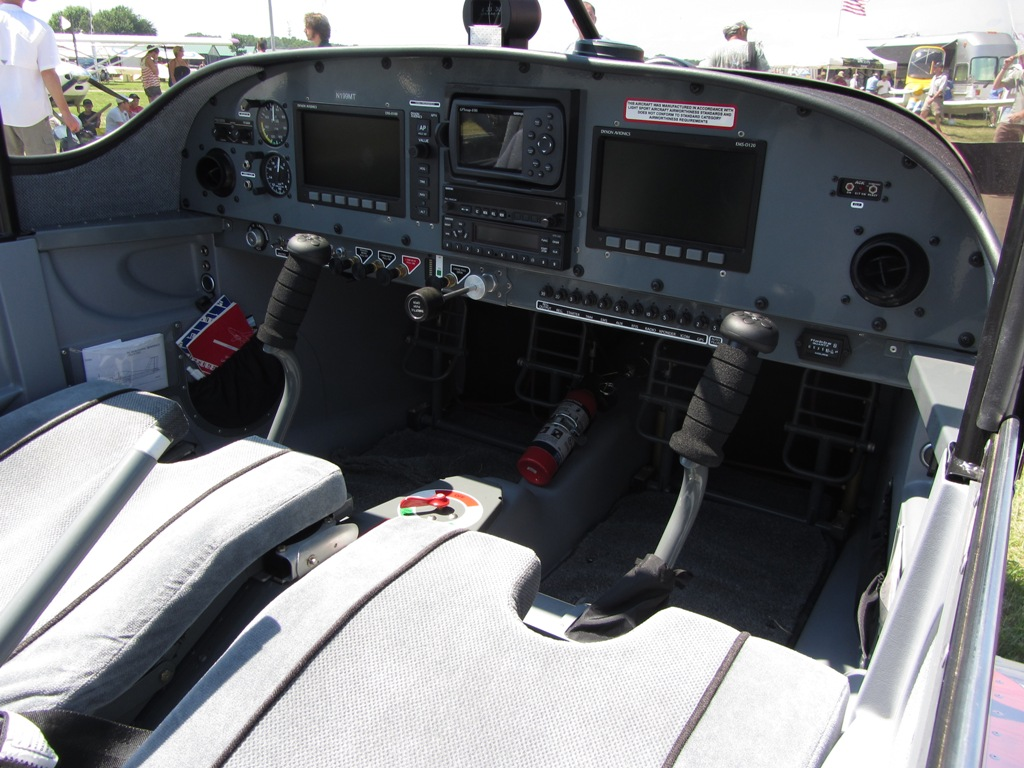
RANS S-19 Cockpit

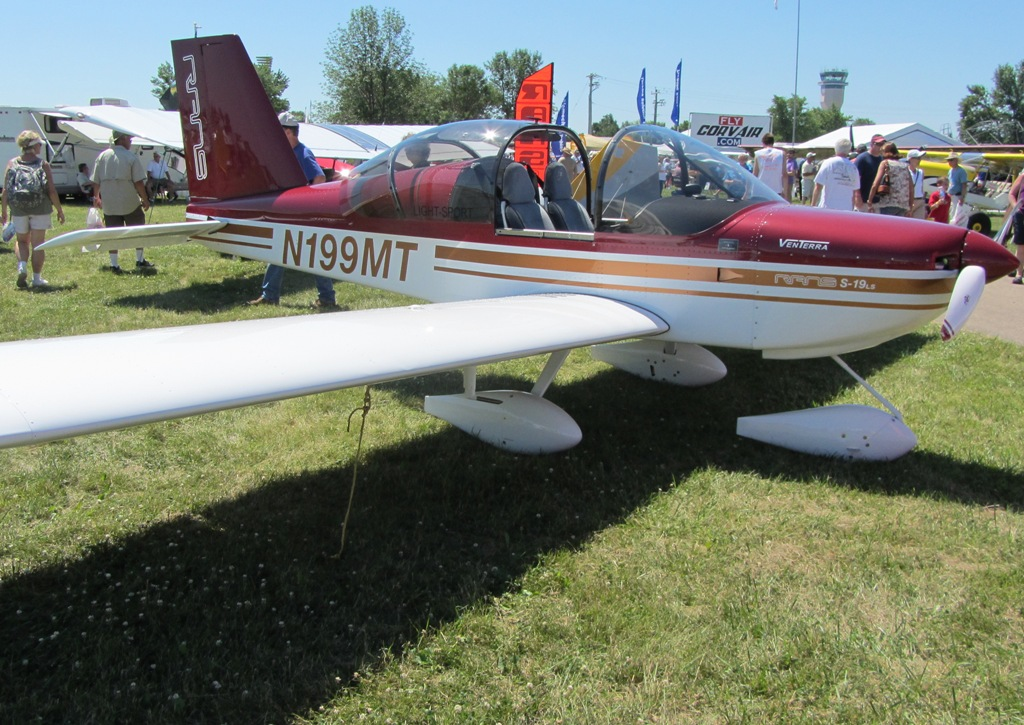
RANS S-19LS

The Rans S-19 Venterra (English: wind over the earth) is an American single-engined, tractor configuration, two-seats in side-by-side configuration, low-wing monoplane designed by Randy Schlitter as a light-sport aircraft and manufactured by Rans Inc. The Venterra is available as a complete factory-built aircraft and in kit form for amateur construction.

== Design and development ==
The S-19 was designed by Randy Schlitter in 2007 as a purpose-built aircraft to capitalize on the new US LSA category. The intention was to offer the aircraft as a factory-complete Special LSA and as a kit-built Experimental LSA or amateur-built..

Unlike most other Rans models, which feature a welded 4130 steel tube cockpit with a bolted aluminum tube rear fuselage, the S-19 is an aluminum semi-monocoque design, with stressed skin construction supported with bulkheads, formers and stringers. The fuselage, wing and tail surfaces are covered in sheet aluminum. The wings are equipped with flaps.

The S-19 has tricycle landing gear with a fully castering nosewheel and steering via differential main wheel braking. The standard engine is the Rotax 912ULS of 100 hp (75 kW).

The designer originally intended to break with the company tradition of providing a name for the aircraft and just designate the aircraft as "S-19". Early aviation media reports referred to it as the "S-19 Sport Plane". But after confusion and inquiries by air traffic control during early flights, Schlitter decided a name was needed, saying, "It is a bit of poetic license, but with 19 designs it has become a challenge to create names that are original, we like the sound of Venterra over the radio, it is easy to say, and should satisfy ATC."

== Operational history ==
In March 2017 there were 41 S-19s registered in the United States, none in Canada and one in the UK.

== Variants ==
S-19
Initial version, kit-built aircraft for the US ELSA or experimental amateur-built categories, powered by a 100 hp (75 kW) Rotax 912ULS
S-19LS
Factory-built version, for the US SLSA category, powered by a 100 hp (75 kW) Rotax 912ULS

== Accidents and notable incidents ==
On 25 June 2017 a Rans S-19 crashed near Hyde, Central Otago, New Zealand, resulting in one death and one serious injury. The Civil Aviation Authority of New Zealand investigation found that the design of the stabilator anti-servo tab trim control resulted in inadvertent activation and a sudden departure from controlled flight. The investigation led to the issuance of a Continuing Airworthiness Notice about deficiencies in the stick grip design and associated hazards.

== Specifications (S-19LS) ==
Data from Rans website

General characteristics

- Crew: One
- Capacity: one passenger
- Length: 19 ft 10.75 in (6.0643 m)
- Wingspan: 28 ft 0 in (8.53 m)
- Height: 7 ft 11.5 in (2.426 m)
- Wing area: 126.9 sq ft (11.79 m^{2})
- Aspect ratio: 6.18:1
- Empty weight: 820 lb (372 kg)
- Gross weight: 1,320 lb (599 kg)
- Fuel capacity: 24 US gallons (91 litres)
- Powerplant: 1 × Rotax 912ULS , 100 hp (75 kW)
- Propellers: 2-bladed composite ground adjustable, 5 ft 8 in (1.73 m) diameter

Performance

- Cruise speed: 128 mph (206 km/h, 111 kn)
- Stall speed: 45 mph (72 km/h, 39 kn) flaps down
- Never exceed speed: 150 mph (240 km/h, 130 kn)
- Range: 580 mi (930 km, 500 nmi)
- Endurance: 5.1 hrs
- Service ceiling: 14,500 ft (4,400 m)
- g limits: +4.4/-2 at max gross weight
- Rate of climb: 900 ft/min (4.6 m/s)
- Wing loading: 10.4 lb/sq ft (51 kg/m^{2})

== See also ==
Aircraft of comparable role, configuration, and era

- CZAW SportCruiser
- Europa XS
- Grumman American AA-1
- Van's Aircraft RV-12
