= Need (disambiguation) =

A need is dissatisfaction at a point of time and in a given context.

Need may also refer to:

== Arts and entertainment ==
- Need (novel series), by Carrie Jones, from 2008
- "Need", an episode of Stargate SG-1 season 2
- Need (Todd Agnew album), 2009
- Need (3OH!3 album), 2021
- "Need" (song), a song by Keltiey from the 2023 album B2B
- "Need", a song by 8stops7 from the 2006 album Bend
- "Need", a song by Gavin DeGraw from the 2013 album Make a Move
- The Need, an American band
- The Need, a 1998 album by MercyMe

== People ==
- Joseph Need (1819–1892), English cricketer
- Stephen Need (born 1954), priest and author

== Other uses ==
- Need, California, a place in California, United States
- Northern European Enclosure Dam (NEED), the proposed enclosure of the North Sea and the English Channel
- Need theory, a motivational model

== See also ==
- Needs (disambiguation)
- Needy (disambiguation)
- Need for Speed (disambiguation)
- Want (disambiguation)
- Demand
- English modal auxiliary verbs#Need
