= Rans S-9 Chaos =

American homebuilt airplane

S-9 Chaos
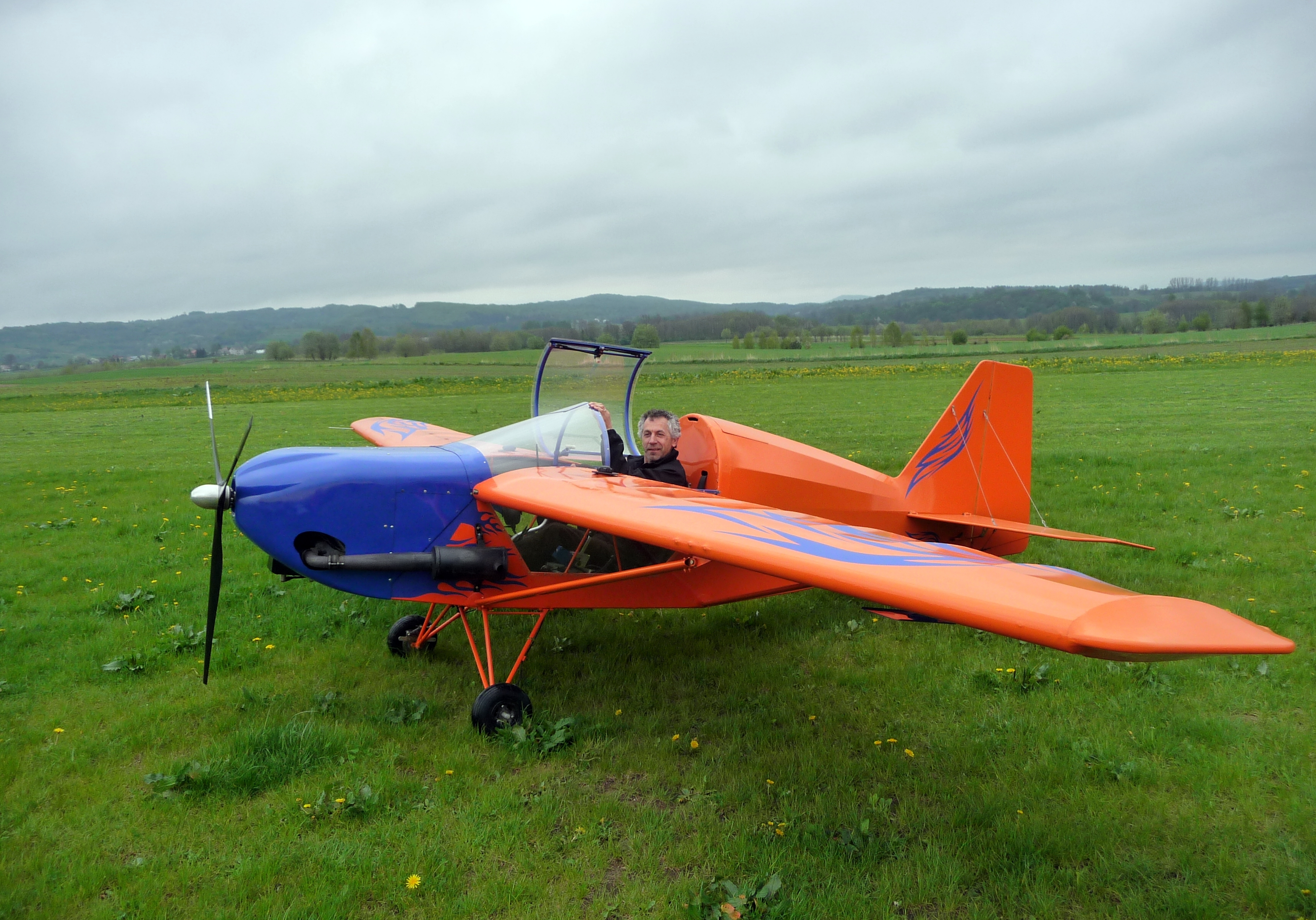

General information
- Type: Kit aircraft
- National origin: United States
- Manufacturer: Rans Inc
- Designer: Randy Schlitter
- Status: In production
- Number built: 215 (2011)

History
- Manufactured: 1986-2006, 2009-present
- Introduction date: 1986
- First flight: 1986
- Variant: Rans S-10 Sakota

The Rans S-9 Chaos is an American single-engined, tractor configuration, single-seat, mid-wing monoplane designed by Randy Schlitter for aerobatics and manufactured by Rans Inc. The Chaos is available in kit form for amateur construction.

Production of the S-9 was ended as part of Rans' reorganization of its product line on 1 June 2006, after having been available for 20 years, but the S-9 was reintroduced in about 2009 and is again available.

== Design and development ==
The S-9 Chaos was designed by Randy Schlitter in 1986 as an inexpensive aerobatic aircraft that will allow sportsman competition aerobatics to be flown or even advanced aerobatics if inverted fuel and oil systems are installed. The Chaos is also a capable cross country aircraft.

Like many Rans models, the S-9 features a welded 4130 steel tube cockpit, with a bolted aluminum tube rear fuselage. All fuselage, wing and tail surfaces are covered in dope and fabric. The reported construction time is 500 man-hours.

The Chaos has conventional landing gear. The basic engine is the Rotax 503 of 50 hp (37 kW), with the Rotax 582 of 64 hp (48 kW) and the Hirth 3701 of 100 hp (75 kW) available as options.

The S-10 Sakota aerobatic two-seater was later developed from the S-9.

== Operational history ==
There were 215 S-9s built and flown by December 2011.

In November 2010 there were 61 S-9s registered in the United States, along with three registered in Canada and two in the UK. Another 23 were on the registers of European countries west of Russia.

== Specifications (S-9) ==
Data from Kitplanes and Aerocrafter

General characteristics

- Crew: One
- Length: 15 ft 8 in (4.78 m)
- Wingspan: 22 ft 0 in (6.71 m)
- Wing area: 91.5 sq ft (8.50 m^{2})
- Empty weight: 320 lb (145 kg)
- Gross weight: 670 lb (304 kg)
- Fuel capacity: 9 US gallons (34 litres)
- Powerplant: 1 × Rotax 503 , 50 hp (37 kW)
- Propellers: 2-bladed wooden

Performance

- Cruise speed: 85 mph (137 km/h, 74 kn)
- Stall speed: 33 mph (53 km/h, 29 kn)
- Range: 210 mi (340 km, 180 nmi)
- Service ceiling: 15,500 ft (4,700 m)
- Rate of climb: 800 ft/min (4.1 m/s)

Avionics

- none

== See also ==
Aircraft of comparable role, configuration, and era

- Murphy Renegade
- Pitts Special
