= Need for Speed: Hot Pursuit =

Need for Speed: Hot Pursuit may refer to one of the following video games:

- Need for Speed III: Hot Pursuit, by EA Canada, released in 1998
- Need for Speed: Hot Pursuit 2, by EA Black Box, released in 2002
- Need for Speed: Hot Pursuit (2010 video game), by Criterion Games, released in 2010
- Need for Speed: Hot Pursuit Remastered, a 2020 remaster of the 2010 game

== See also ==
- Need for Speed (disambiguation)
- Hot pursuit (disambiguation)
