= Keltiey =

- Birth name: Kelscie Moore
- Born: 1996 or 1997 (age 27–28) Houston, Texas
- Genres: Electronic
- Occupations: Singer; songwriter
- Instrument: Vocals
- Years active: 2022–present
- Labels: Geffen

Kelscie Moore, professionally known as Keltiey, is an American singer and songwriter. She rose to prominence in 2022 with her breaking single, "Need" going viral in 2022. It rose in virality on platforms such as TikTok, and has since then surpassed over 15 million streams as of July 2023.

== Discography ==
=== Extended plays ===
List of EPs, with selected details
| Title | EP details |
|---|---|
| B2B | Released: November 17, 2023; Label: Geffen Records; Format: Digital download, streaming |

=== Singles ===
- Dumiri (2023)
- Need (2022)
