= Pursuit =

Pursuit may refer to:

== Arts and entertainment ==
=== Films ===
- Pursuit (1935 film), a 1935 American action film
- Pursuit (1972 American film), a made-for-TV film directed by Michael Crichton
- Pursuit (1972 Hong Kong film), a Shaw Brothers film
- Pursuit (1989 film), a TV miniseries directed by Ian Sharp
- Pursuit (2015 film), an Irish film
- Pursuit (2022 film), an American film
- Apache Blood or Pursuit, a 1975 film directed by Vern Piehl

=== Music ===
- Pursuit (album), 2012 album by Stuck in the Sound
- The Pursuit (album), a 2009 album by Jamie Cullum
- "Pursuit", a 2010 song by In Fear and Faith from the album, Imperial

=== Television ===
==== Episodes ====
- "Pursuit", Baywatch Nights season 1, episode 1 (1995)
- "Pursuit", Cadillacs and Dinosaurs episode 10 (1993)
- "Pursuit", Crime Story season 2, episode 20 (1988)
- "Pursuit", Death Note episode 4 (2006)
- "Pursuit", .hack//Roots episode 20 (2007)
- "Pursuit", Joker Game episode 10 (2016)
- "Pursuit", Law & Order: Special Victims Unit season 12, episode 17 (2011)
- "Pursuit", The Big Valley season 2, episode 5 (1966)
- "Pursuit", The Bill series 22, episode 35 (2006)
- "Pursuit", The Guardians episode 2 (1971)
- "Pursuit", The Tenant of Wildfell Hall episode 4 (1969)
- "Pursuit", Voyagers! episode 16 (1983)
- "Pursuit", Z-Cars series 9, episode 8 (1974)
- "The Pursuit", Dick Turpin episode 5 (1979)
- "The Pursuit", McKenna episode 6 (1995)
- "The Pursuit", Rawhide season 8, episode 9 (1965)
- "The Pursuit", The Waltons season 9, episode 6 (1981)

==== Shows ====
- Pursuit (TV series), a 1950s anthology

=== Novels and games ===
- Pursuit (Mangels and Martin novel), a 2003 science fiction novel by Andy Mangels and Michael A. Martin
- Pursuit (Oates novel), a 2019 novel by Joyce Carol Oates
- Pursuit, a 1978 novel by Robert L. Fish
- Pursuit (video game), a 1975 Atari game

== Government ==
- Pursue strategy, part of the anti-terror strategy at the UK's Home Office

== Sports ==
- Individual pursuit, a biathlon event
- Individual pursuit, a track cycling event
- Pursuit racing, where two or more competitors/teams are chasing after each other or a lead competitor/team
- Team pursuit, an event in long track speed skating
- Team pursuit, a track cycling event

== Vehicles ==
- Pontiac Pursuit or Chevrolet Cobalt, an automobile
- Pursuit aircraft, the US term for a fighter aircraft until the 1940s
- Rans S-11 Pursuit, a light aircraft

== See also ==
- Chase (disambiguation)
