= Needy =

Needy may refer to:

- Narcissistic, a self-centered personality style that often requires constant attention from others
- Poverty, a persistent lack of material needs
- Needy, Oregon, an unincorporated community in Oregon
- "Needy" (song), an Ariana Grande song on her 2019 album Thank U, Next
- "Needy", a song by The Good Life on the 2004 album Album of the Year
- Anita "Needy" Lesnicki, a nickname for a fictional character from the 2009 film Jennifer's Body
- Needy Guims, retired French sprinter
- Needy, a character from the sixth season of Battle for Dream Island, an animated web series

== See also ==
- Welfare spending, government support for the needy
- Need (disambiguation)
- Needs (disambiguation)
