= Rans S-16 Shekari =

S-16 Shekari

General information
- Type: Amateur-built aerobatic monoplane
- National origin: United States
- Manufacturer: Rans Inc
- Designer: Randy Schlitter
- Status: Production completed June 2006
- Number built: 22 (as of December 2004)

History
- Introduction date: 1998
- First flight: 1994

The Rans S-16 Shekari is an American single-engined, two-seat, low-wing, experimental amateur built aerobatic monoplane designed by Randy Schlitter, and produced by Rans Inc of Hays, Kansas, and sold as a kit for amateur construction.

== Design and development ==
Conceived as a new generation of Rans aircraft focusing on quicker built times and higher performance, the Shekari is stressed for dual aerobatics.

The Shekari has a 4130 steel tube-and-fabric forward fuselage with composite covering and 6061-T3 aluminum tube rear fuselage and tail. It is available as either a tail wheel landing gear or tricycle landing gear versions. The wings are removable by one person in ten minutes for storage or trailering.

The S-16 has been flown with the Rotax 912UL of 80 hp (60 kW), but is typically equipped with engines such as the Continental IO-240 of 130 hp (97 kW) and can accept engines up to the Lycoming O-320 with 160 hp (119 kW). Construction time claimed is 600 to 1500 man-hours, depending on builder experience.

Production of the S-16 was ended as part of Rans' extensive reorganization of its product line on 1 June 2006, after the kit had been available for 8 years. Twenty-two had been completed and flown by the end of 2005.

== Specifications ==
Data from Kitplanes, Aerocrafter

General characteristics

- Crew: One
- Capacity: One passenger
- Length: 18 ft 8 in (5.69 m)
- Wingspan: 24 ft 0 in (7.32 m)
- Height: 5 ft 5 in (1.65 m)
- Wing area: 86.5 sq ft (8.04 m^{2})
- Empty weight: 850 lb (386 kg)
- Gross weight: 1,650 lb (748 kg)
- Fuel capacity: 32 US gallons (121 litres)
- Powerplant: 1 × Continental IO-240-B piston engine, 130 hp (97 kW)
- Propellers: 3-bladed composite

Performance

- Maximum speed: 220 mph (350 km/h, 190 kn)
- Cruise speed: 160 mph (260 km/h, 140 kn)
- Stall speed: 50 mph (80 km/h, 43 kn) flaps down
- Never exceed speed: 248 mph (399 km/h, 216 kn)
- Range: 980 mi (1,570 km, 850 nmi)
- Service ceiling: 14,000 ft (4,300 m)
- g limits: +9/-9
- Rate of climb: 1,200 ft/min (6.1 m/s)
