= Rans Designs =

American aircraft manufacturer

- Industry: Aerospace, Bicycles
- Genre: Private company
- Founded: 1974; 52 years ago
- Founder: Randy Schlitter
- Headquarters: Hays, Kansas, United States
- Key people: CEO Randy Schlitter
- Products: Light-sport aircraft, kit aircraft, bicycles, tricycles
- Website: www.rans.com

Rans Designs, previously called Rans Inc. (styled all in capitals as RANS), is an American aircraft and, formerly, a leading American recumbent bicycle and tricycle manufacturer, based in Hays, Kansas, United States. The company name is a portmanteau of the first and last names of the company founder, Randy Schlitter. Rans has produced over 3000 aircraft in kit form and as completed aircraft.

== History ==
Rans was founded in 1974 as a pedal-powered sail trike and unpowered land yacht manufacturer. Early pedal-powered sail trikes were the Delta SX, Eagle 4, Windhawk and the Monorai. The company was successful in the marketplace, producing over 1500 sail trikes, and also in racing. Even two place tandem pedal-powered sail trikes were produced, like the Rans Gemini. Rans sail trikes were used by such people as avid sailor Bob Hope.

After trying hang gliding and considering designing an ultralight sailplane, Schlitter turned his attention to designing an ultralight aircraft. Dissatisfied with the early ultralights available, he commenced construction of his S-4 Coyote prototype in November 1982. Schlitter founded a new company Aero-Max, with investment from a friend to produce the S-4. The S-4 first flew in March 1983, but the company broke up over financial issues and the design fell to Rans to produce.

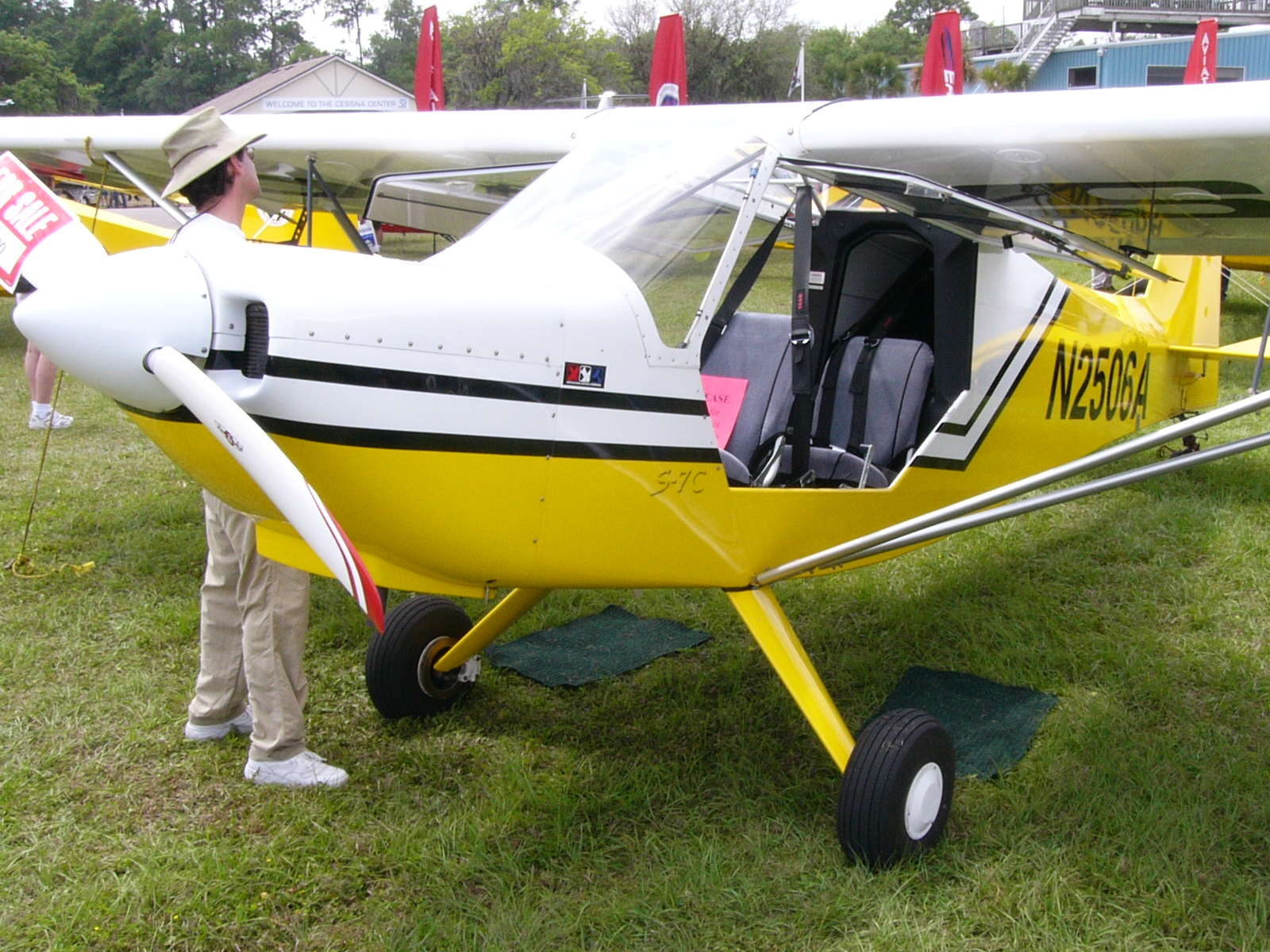
Rans S-7C Courier

Schlitter kept designing new aircraft and by 2006 had a stable of 12 designs in production. On 1 June 2006 Schlitter ended production of many of the designs to concentrate on the new light-sport aircraft market. In 2010 the line consisted of six basic aircraft designs.

By January 2022 the company indicated it was ending bicycle production and was offering the last of its frames for sale. Shortly thereafter the company bike website was blanked.

== Aircraft ==
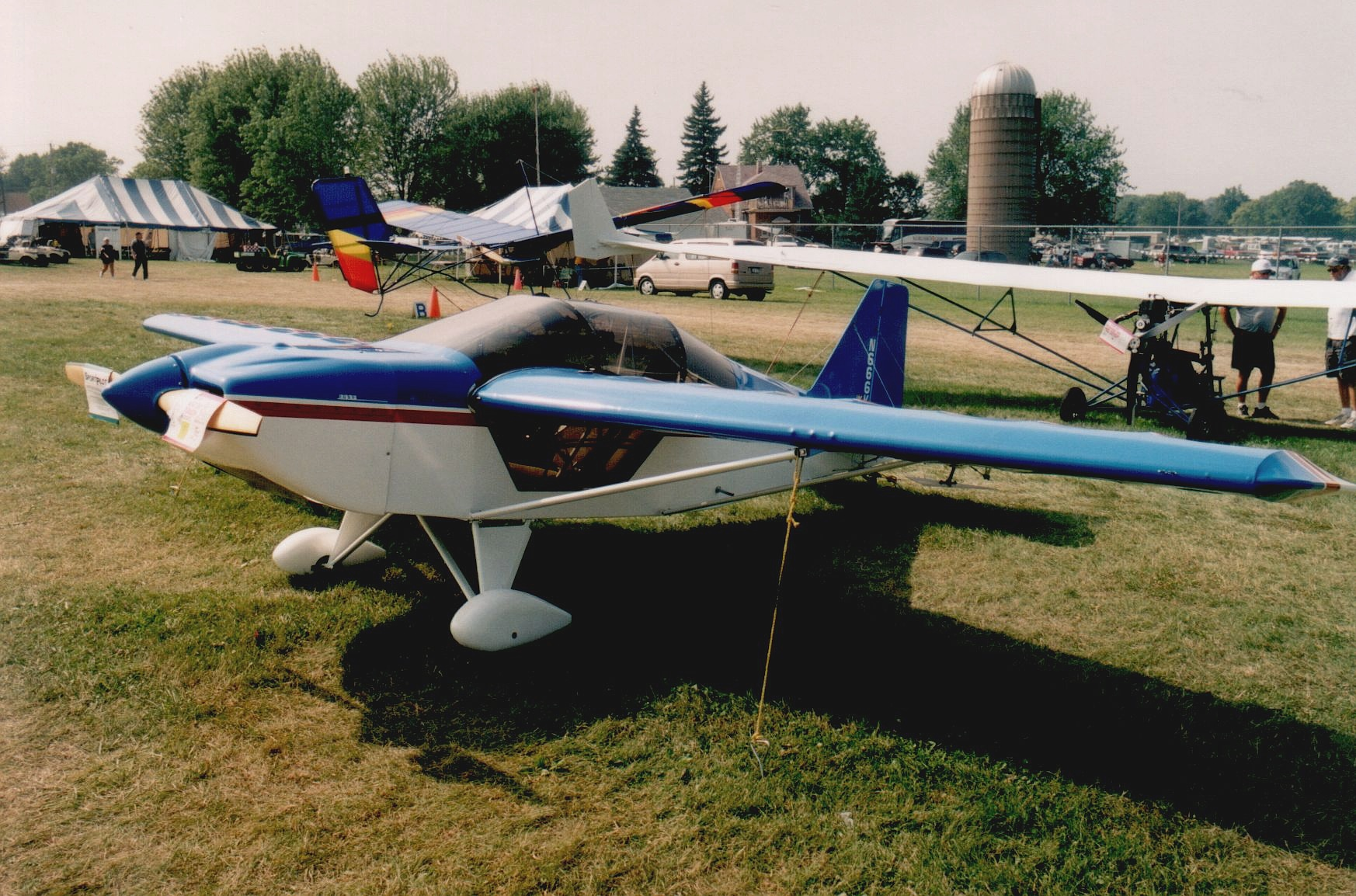
Rans S-10 Sakota

Summary of aircraft built by Rans
Model name	First flight	Number built (as of)	Type
Rans S-2 Coyote	1983	1	Single seat, high wing, conventional landing gear ultralight
Rans S-3 Coyote	1983	1	Single seat, high wing, conventional landing gear ultralight
Rans S-4 Coyote	1983	246 (December 1998)	Single seat, high wing, conventional landing gear ultralight
Rans S-5 Coyote	1983	included in S-4 total	Single seat, high wing, tricycle landing gear ultralight
Rans S-6 Coyote II	1988	1842 (January 2008)	Two seat, high wing, tricycle or conventional landing gear light aircraft
Rans S-7 Courier	1985	325 (December 2007)	Two seat, high wing, conventional landing gear light aircraft
Rans S-9 Chaos	1986	129 (December 1998)	Single seat, mid-wing, conventional landing gear aerobatic ultralight
Rans S-10 Sakota	1988	147 (December 1998)	Two seat, mid-wing, conventional landing gear aerobatic light aircraft
Rans S-11 Pursuit	1991	3 (prototypes only)	Single seat, low-wing, tricycle landing gear lifting body
Rans S-12 Airaile	1990	1000 (2006)	Two seat, high-wing, tricycle landing gear light aircraft
Rans S-14 Airaile	1991	125 (December 2004)	Single seat, high-wing, tricycle landing gear ultralight
Rans S-15 Pursuit II		Not-built	Two-seat, low-wing, retractable tricycle landing gear lifting body
Rans S-16 Shekari	1994	22 (December 2004)	Two seat, low wing, conventional or tricycle landing gear light aircraft
Rans S-17 Stinger	1996	38 (December 2004)	Single seat, high-wing, conventional landing gear, open cockpit ultralight
Rans S-18 Stinger II	2000	30 (December 2004)	Two seat, high-wing, conventional landing gear, open cockpit ultralight trainer
Rans S-19 Venterra	2007	11 (November 2010)	Two seat, low wing, tricycle landing gear light-sport aircraft
Rans S-20 Raven	2013	1 (January 2014)	Two seat, high wing, tricycle or conventional landing gear light-sport bush aircraft
Rans S-21 Outbound	2017	1 (May 2018)	Two seat, high wing, tricycle or conventional landing gear light-sport bush aircraft

== Cycles ==
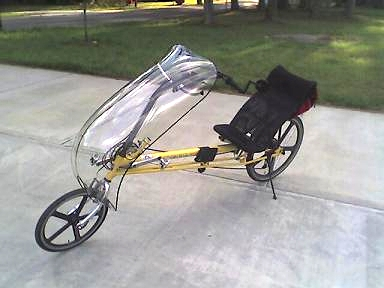
Rans V2 Formula long wheelbase recumbent bicycle fitted with a fairing

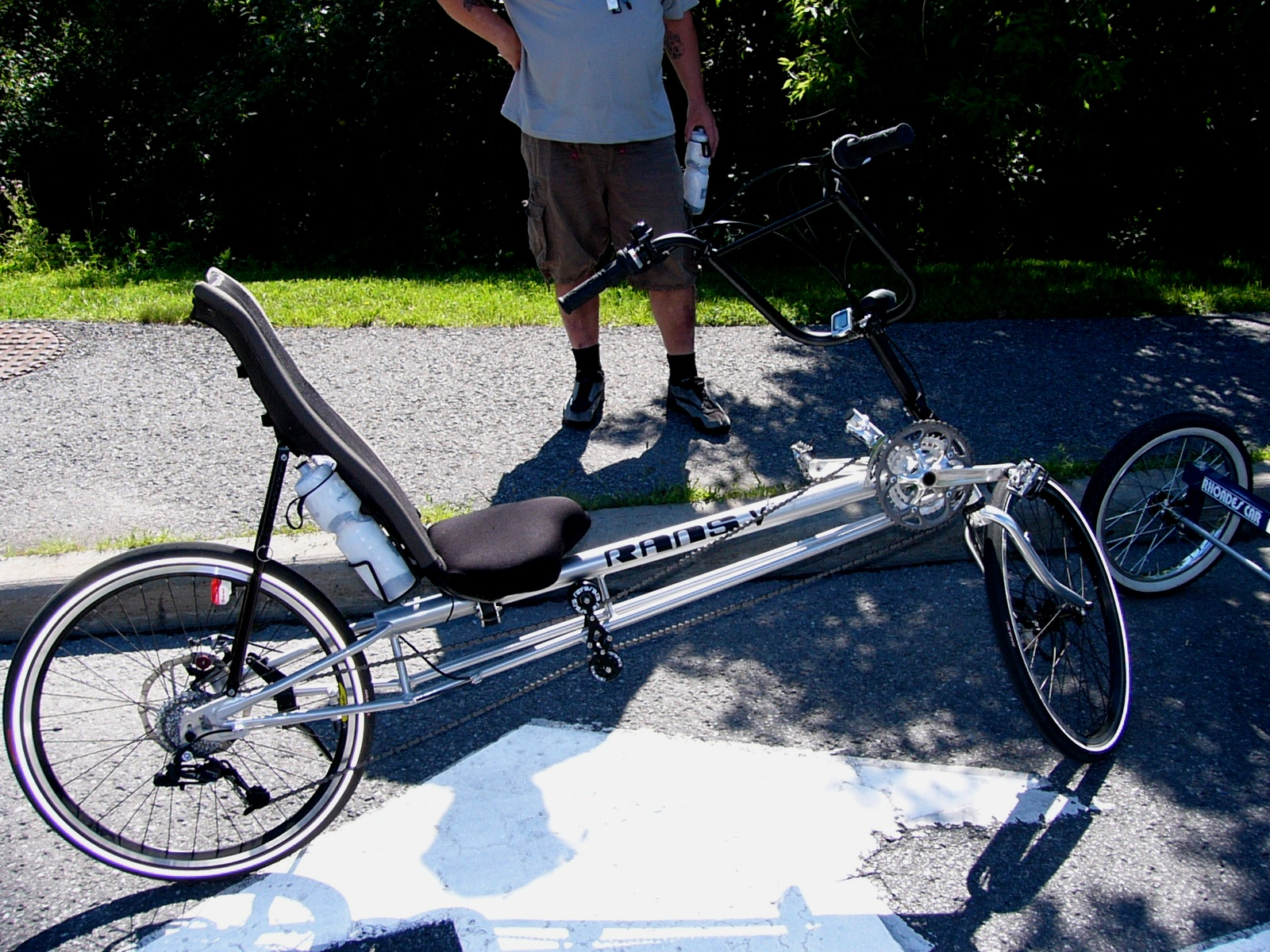
Rans V long wheelbase recumbent bicycle

Rans was also known as a leading designer, manufacturer and marketer of upright and recumbent bicycles. In 2011 the bike line included 16 crank forward upright bike models, 16 recumbents, three tandems and one delta tricycle.

Pedal forward

- Fusion
- Fusion ST
- Cruz
- Dynamik
- Citi
- Street
- Sequoia
- Hammertruck
- Zenetik
- Alterra Road
- Alterra Ti Road
- Alterra
- Alterra Ti
- Alterra 29
- Alterra 700x
- Mini

Recumbents

- V-Rex LE
- Ti-Rex
- Enduro 26
- Enduro Sport
- F5
- F5 Pro
- Formula LE
- Stratus LE
- Stratus XP
- Stratus XP TI
- Stratus XP ALl
- Xstream
- Xstream 26
- Xstream Team
- Rocket
- Vivo

Tandems

- Dynamic Duo
- Screamer
- Seavo

Trikes

- Trizard
