= Need for Speed (disambiguation) =

Need for Speed is a racing video game franchise.

Need for speed may also refer to:

== Need for Speed franchise ==
- The Need for Speed, a 1994 video game and the first installment in the Need for Speed franchise
- Need for Speed (film), a 2014 film based on the video game franchise and directed by Scott Waugh
- Need for Speed (2015 video game), a video game in the eponymous franchise developed by Ghost Games

== Other uses ==
- "The Need for Speed" (Legends of Tomorrow), an episode of Legends of Tomorrow
- "The Need for Speed" (Star Wars Resistance)
- Michel Vaillant (film), a 2003 French racing film known as Need for Speed in the UK
- Need for Speed, a photograph by Joseph McKeown of the Argentinian driver Fangio in the 1954 French Grand Prix
- "I feel the need—the need for speed.", a popular line in the 1986 film Top Gun

== See also ==
- Need for Speed: Hot Pursuit (disambiguation)
- Need (disambiguation)
- Speed (disambiguation)
