= Needs (disambiguation) =

Needs are things considered, or perceived as being, necessary.

Needs may refer to:

== Songs ==
- "Needs", by Collective Soul from the 1999 album Dosage
- "Needs", by Justin Martin, 2020
- "Needs", by Verzache, 2018
- "Needs", by Mia Wray, 2021
- "Needs" (song), a 2023 song by Tinashe

== Other uses ==
- James Needs (1919–2003), British film editor
- Needs Convenience, a Canadian convenience store
- "Needs" (Dollhouse), a 2009 television episode
- Maslow's hierarchy of needs, an idea in psychology proposed by Abraham Maslow

== See also ==
- "Wants and Needs", a 2021 song by Drake and Lil Baby
- Need (disambiguation)
- Needy (disambiguation)
