= Rans S-4 Coyote =

Family of monoplanes designed by Randy Schlitter

S-4 & S-5 Coyote
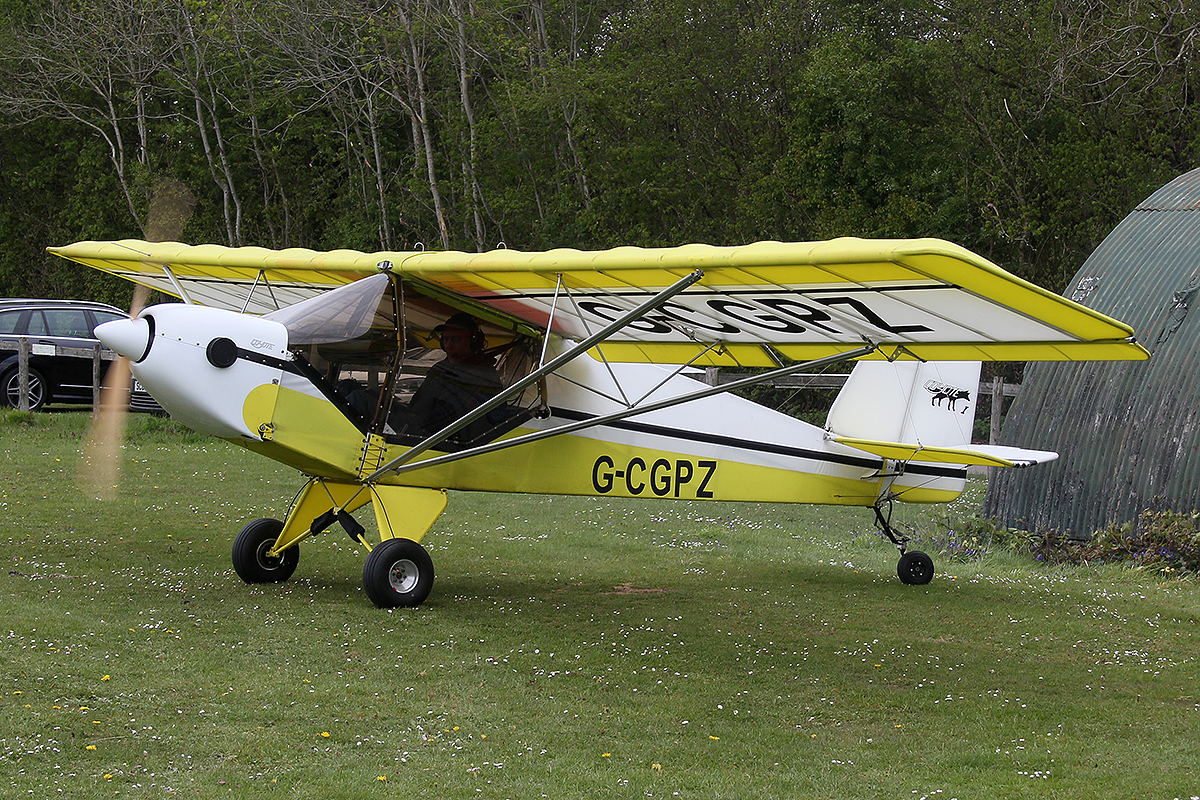
- Rans S-4 Coyote

General information
- Type: Kit aircraft
- National origin: United States
- Manufacturer: Rans Inc
- Designer: Randy Schlitter
- Status: Production completed 1 June 2006
- Number built: 246 (December 1998)

History
- Manufactured: 1983–2006
- First flight: March 1983 (S-2)
- Variant: Rans S-6 Coyote II

The Rans S-4 Coyote and Rans S-5 Coyote are a family of American single-engined, tractor configuration, single-seat, high-wing monoplanes designed by Randy Schlitter and manufactured by Aero-Max and later by Rans Inc. The Coyote was available in kit form for amateur construction as an ultralight aircraft or amateur-built aircraft.

Production of both designs was completed on 1 June 2006 after having been available for 23 years.

== Design and development ==
The Coyote single seat was designed by Randy Schlitter in 1982, as a result of his dissatisfaction with existing ultralight designs at the time. Construction of the first S-2 Coyote prototype was started in November 1982, with the first flight following in March 1983. Originally the design was to be manufactured by a new company Aero-Max, which was a partnership between Schlitter and a friend of his. The partnership failed over financial issues and kit manufacturing was passed to Schlitter's company, Rans, which was at that time building sailtrikes.

Both models of the family feature a welded 4130 steel tube cockpit, with a bolted aluminum tube rear fuselage, wing and tail surfaces all covered in pre-sewn Dacron envelopes, which shorten construction time. The reported construction time is 211 man-hours.

The Coyote S-4 has conventional landing gear, while the S-5 has tricycle gear. Both can be equipped with floats and skis. The original basic engine was the Rotax 277 of 28 hp (21 kW), with the Rotax 447 of 40 hp (30 kW) and the Rotax 503 of 50 hp (37 kW) available later as options.

The Coyote II two-seater was later developed from the S-5.

== Operational history ==
There were 246 S-4s and S-5s built and flown by December 1998.

Many S-4s are flown as unregistered ultralights in the US, but in November 2010 there were four registered along with four S-5s. In November 2010 there were four S-4s and one S-5 registered in Canada. In December 2010 there were nine S-4s and three S-5s registered in the United Kingdom.

== Variants ==
S-2
Prototype first flown in March 1983
S-3
Improved prototype flown in September 1983, entered production as the S-4
S-4
Conventional landing gear version intended as a FAR 103 Ultralight Vehicles compliant design when equipped with the standard 28 hp (21 kW) Rotax 277 engine. No longer in production.
S-5
Tricycle landing gear version for the US Experimental amateur-built category with options such as brakes. Engines include Rotax 447 of 40 hp (30 kW) and the Rotax 503 of 50 hp (37 kW). No longer in production.

== Specifications (S-5) ==
Data from Kitplanes and Aerocrafter

General characteristics

- Crew: One
- Length: 17 ft 0 in (5.18 m)
- Wingspan: 29 ft 6 in (8.99 m)
- Wing area: 127 sq ft (11.8 m^{2})
- Empty weight: 325 lb (147 kg)
- Gross weight: 587 lb (266 kg)
- Fuel capacity: 9 US gallons (34 litres)
- Powerplant: 1 × Rotax 503 , 50 hp (37 kW)
- Propellers: 2-bladed wooden

Performance

- Maximum speed: 95 mph (153 km/h, 83 kn)
- Cruise speed: 70 mph (110 km/h, 61 kn)
- Stall speed: 27 mph (43 km/h, 23 kn)
- Range: 181 mi (291 km, 157 nmi)
- Service ceiling: 13,000 ft (4,000 m)
- Rate of climb: 800 ft/min (4.1 m/s)

Avionics

- none

== See also ==
Aircraft of comparable role, configuration, and era

- Denney Kitfox
- Fisher FP-505 Skeeter
- Fisher FP-606 Sky Baby
