= Rans S-11 Pursuit =

American homebuilt aircraft

S-11 Pursuit

General information
- Type: Kit aircraft
- National origin: United States
- Manufacturer: Rans Inc
- Designer: Randy Schlitter
- Status: Three prototypes built
- Number built: At least three built

History
- First flight: 1991

The Rans S-11 Pursuit is an American single-engined, tractor configuration, single-seat, low-wing aircraft, based on the lifting body principle, designed and built by Randy Schlitter. The Pursuit was listed as under development in 1998, but only prototypes were ever completed and the aircraft is not part of the present Rans aircraft line.

== Design and development ==
The S-11 was conceived as a unique single seat sport aircraft, based on the lifting body concept pioneered by NASA in the 1960s. The aircraft design derives 80% of its lift from the aircraft fuselage and associated strakes and only 20% from its straight wings.

The Pursuit is a straked, low wing single or dual seat aircraft with tricycle landing gear and dual rudders. It is made from a welded steel fuselage with aluminum ribs and a composite shell. The prototype's engine was a Rotax 912UL of 80 hp (60 kW), with the Rotax 582 of 64 hp (48 kW) intended to be offered as an option.

== Operational history ==
A prototype, N2164K, was registered with the Federal Aviation Administration in July 1990 and destroyed on 19 January 1991. Another prototype, N4299Y, was registered with the FAA in June 1991 and had its registration cancelled in March 2001. Another prototype, N7012W, was granted an FAA registration on 5 May 1993.

== Accidents and incidents ==
A prototype S-11, N2164K, was involved in an accident on 19 January 1991. The aircraft suffered an engine failure caused by a seized piston at altitude. The landing was hard and resulted in a fire. The pilot received serious injuries. The National Transportation Safety Board assessed cause factors as engine failure followed by a high descent rate on landing. The aircraft is listed as destroyed.

== Variants ==
S-11
Prototype first flown in January 1991.
S-11A
Prototype with improvements, first flown in January 1992.
S-11B
Prototype with further improvements, first flown in January 1993.
S-15 Pursuit II
Proposed two-seat variant with retractable landing gear, not built.

== Specifications (S-11) ==
Data from Aerocrafter, Popular Mechanics

General characteristics

- Crew: One
- Length: 18 ft 0 in (5.49 m)
- Wingspan: 20 ft 0 in (6.10 m)
- Empty weight: 575 lb (261 kg)
- Gross weight: 1,075 lb (488 kg)
- Fuel capacity: 20 US gallons (76 litres)
- Powerplant: 1 × Rotax 912UL , 80 hp (60 kW)

Performance

- Cruise speed: 140 mph (230 km/h, 120 kn)
- Stall speed: 48 mph (77 km/h, 42 kn)
- Never exceed speed: 225 mph (362 km/h, 196 kn)
- Service ceiling: 18,000 ft (5,500 m)
- Rate of climb: 1,500 ft/min (7.6 m/s)

== See also ==
- Northrop HL-10

Aircraft of comparable role, configuration, and era

- NASA M2-F1
- Glasair I
