= Rans S-6 Coyote II =

American light aircraft

S-6 Coyote II
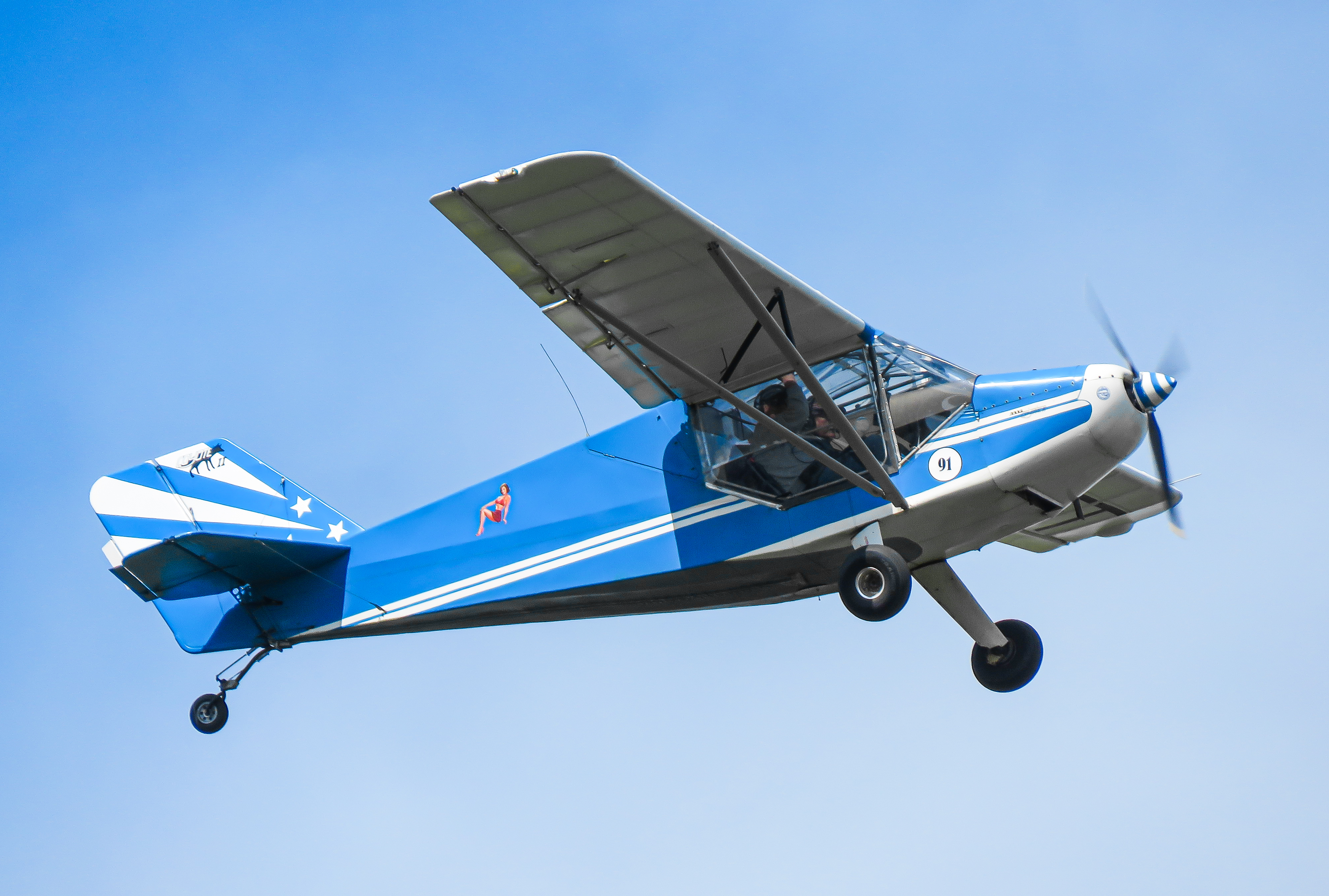
- Rans S-6 taking off from St. Cyr Aerodrome

General information
- Type: Kit and Light-sport aircraft
- National origin: United States
- Manufacturer: Rans Inc
- Designer: Randy Schlitter
- Status: No longer in production (2015)
- Number built: 2100 (2011)

History
- First flight: 1988
- Developed from: Rans S-5 Coyote; Rans S-4 Coyote

The Rans S-6 Coyote II is an American single-engined, tractor configuration, two-seat, high-wing monoplane designed by Randy Schlitter and manufactured by Rans Inc. The Coyote was previously available in kit form for amateur construction or as a completed light-sport aircraft.

== Design and development ==
The original single seat S-4 Coyote was designed by Rans owner Randy Schlitter in 1982, as a result of his dissatisfaction with existing ultralight designs at the time. Construction of the first Coyote prototype was started in November 1982, with the first flight following in March 1983.

The Coyote II two-seater was developed from the S-5 Coyote, itself a development of the S-4 Coyote. The initial two seat model, the S-6, was replaced by the improved S-6ES ("extended span") model in April 1990. In 1993, the ES was joined in production by the S-6S Super Coyote.

All models of the S-6 feature a welded 4130 steel tube cockpit, with a riveted aluminum tube rear fuselage, wing and tail surfaces all covered in fabric. In the initial S-6 and S-6ES, the fabric consists of pre-sewn Dacron envelopes, which shorten construction time. The S-6S, however, uses the more traditional dope and fabric. The reported construction times for the ES are 250 man-hours versus 500 for the Super.

The Coyote II kit could be ordered with tricycle or conventional landing gear, and can also be equipped with floats and skis. The original basic engine was the Rotax 503 of 50 hp (37 kW), with the Rotax 582 of 64 hp (48 kW) being available as an option. Today, the standard engine is the 80 hp (60 kW) Rotax 912UL, with the 100 hp (75 kW) Rotax 912ULS being optional. The aircraft can also be fitted with the Sauer S 2200 UL

== Operational history ==
The Coyote has proven to be popular with customers, with over 1800 examples of the type having flown as of January 2008. In November 2010 615 were on the registers of European countries west of Russia, excluding Ireland.

One example of the S-6ES was flown across the Atlantic Ocean twice.

== Variants ==
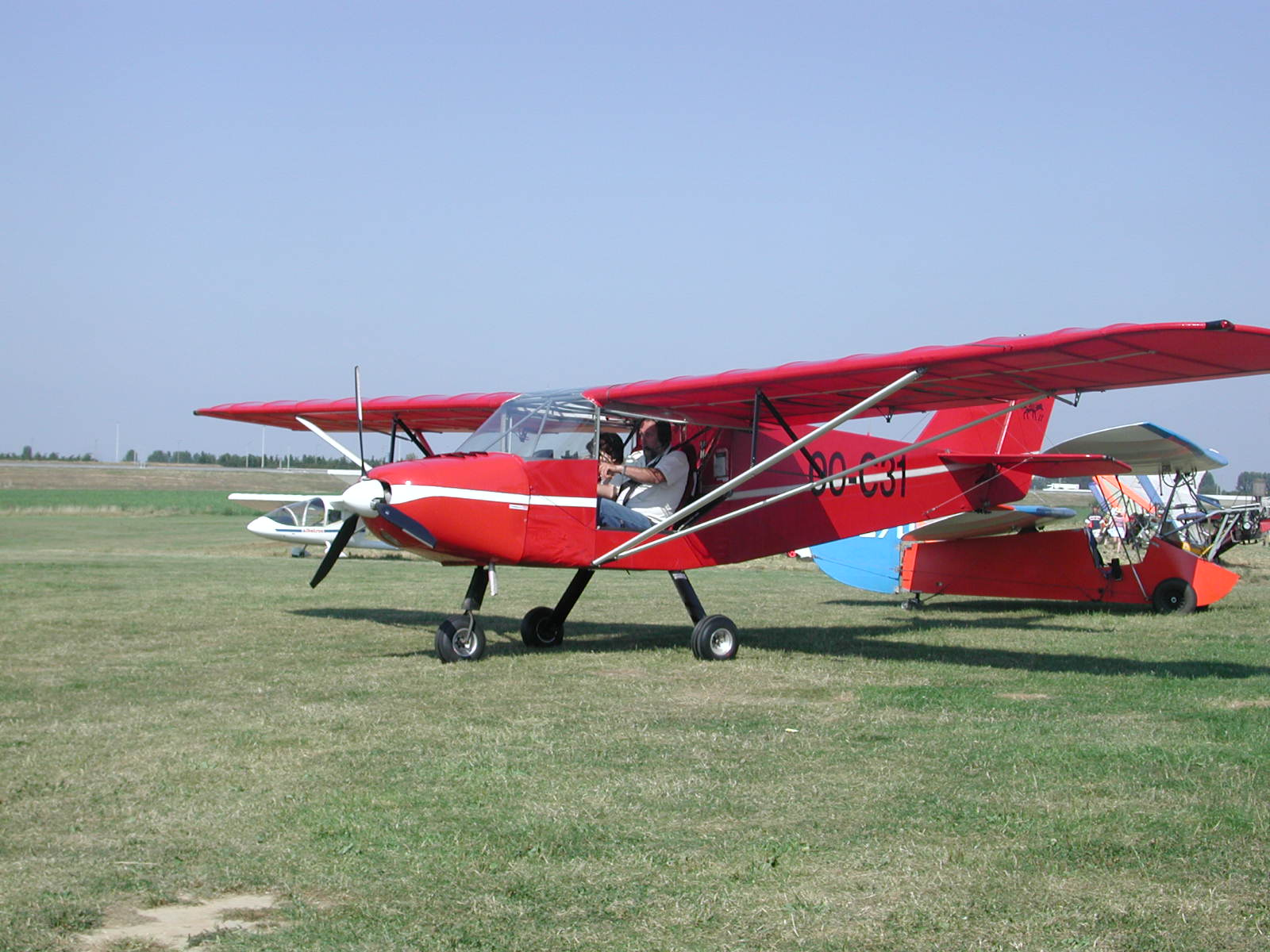
S-6 Coyote with tricycle landing gear.

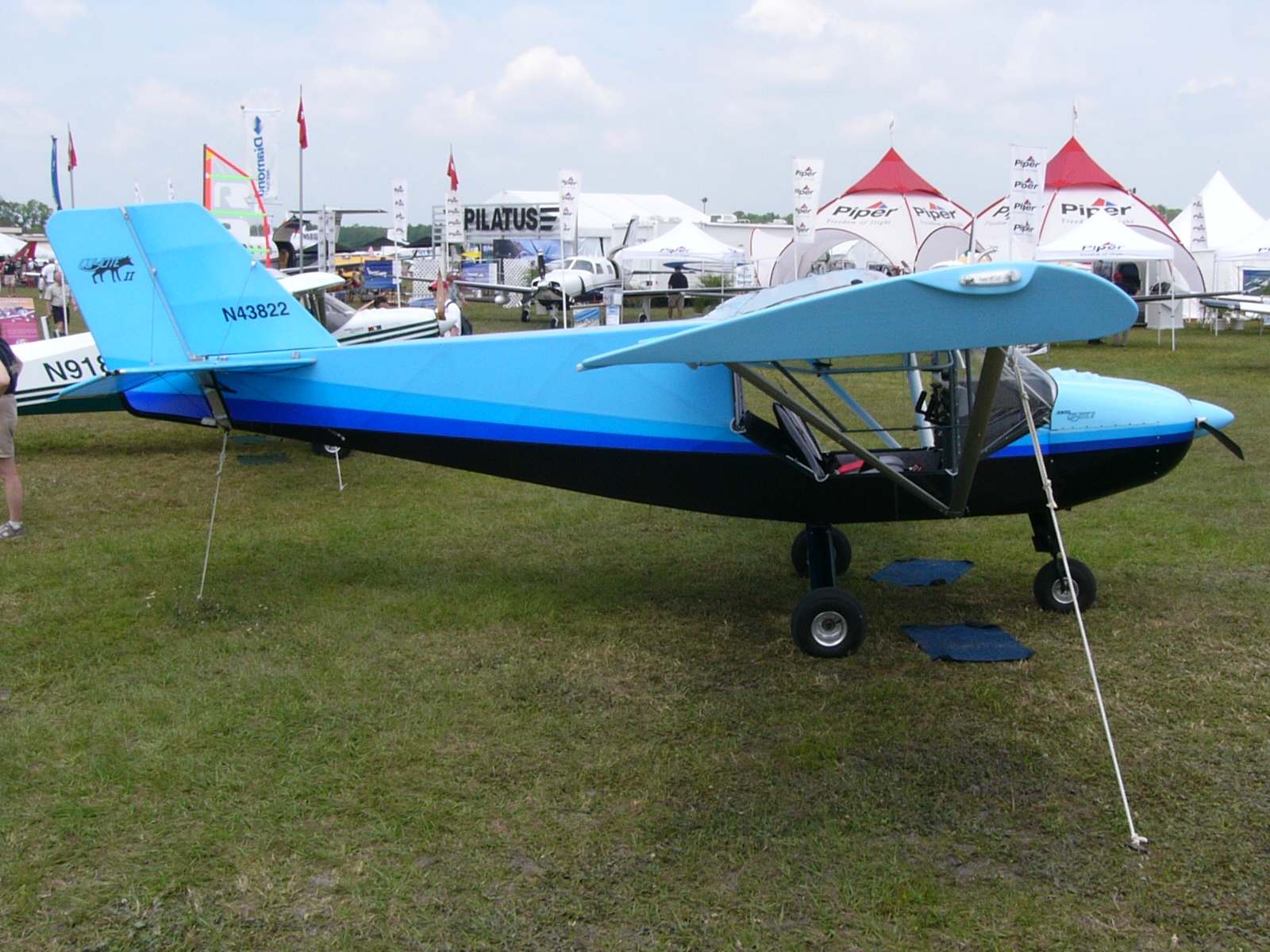
S-6ES Coyote with tricycle landing gear.

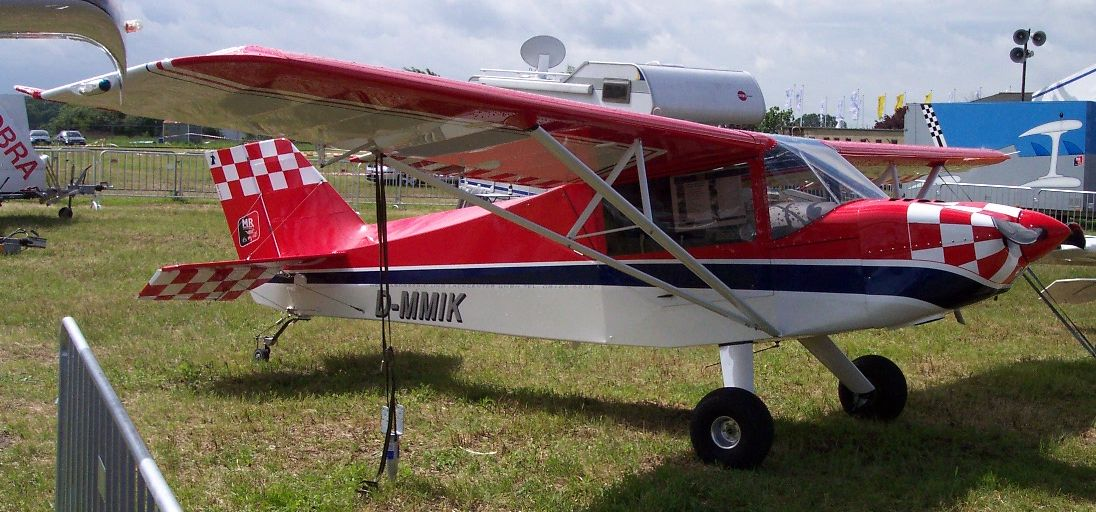
S-6S "Super Six" with conventional landing gear.

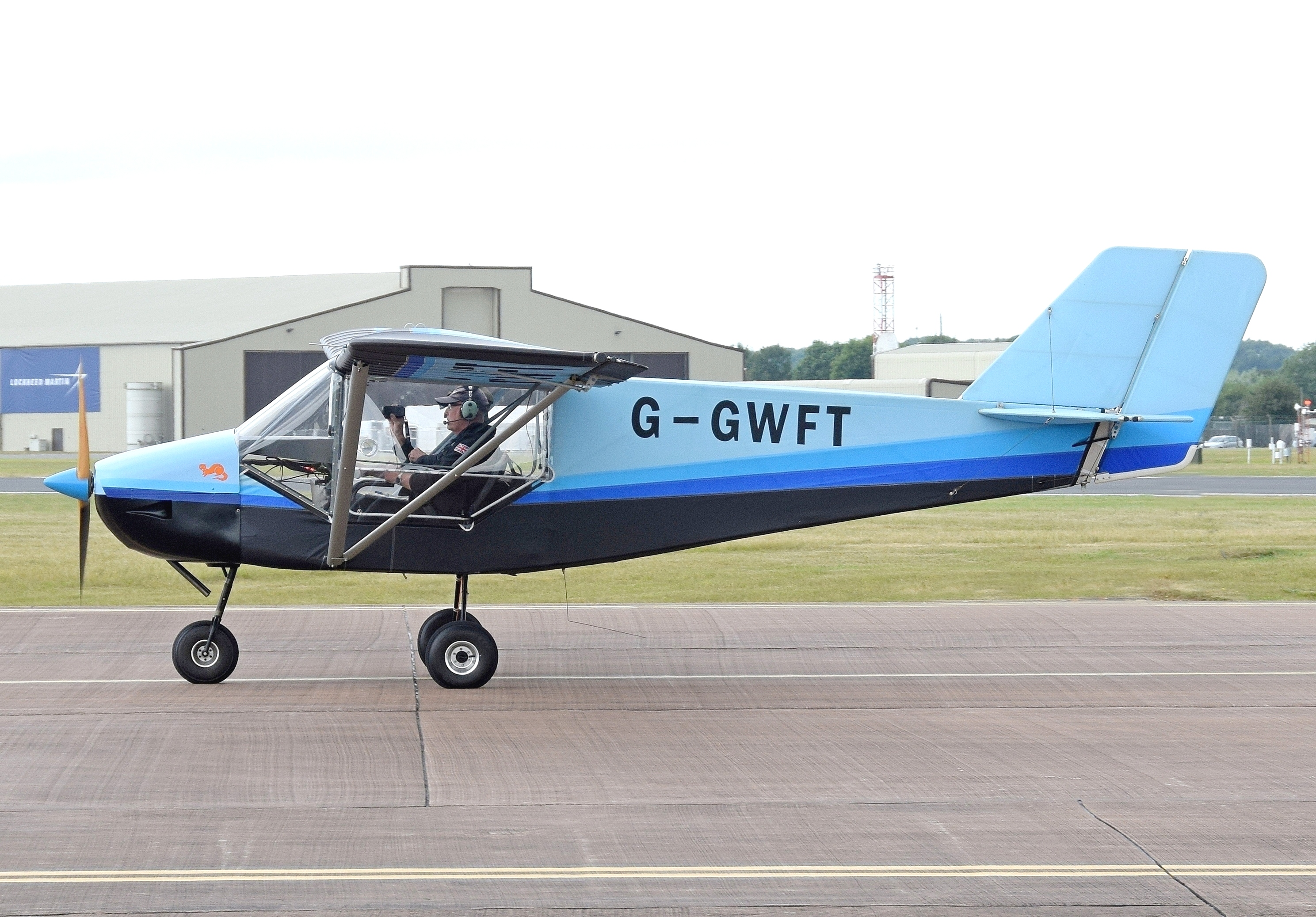
Rans S-6 Coyote II ultralight made by the students of Ercall Wood Technology College, England, arrives at the 2017 RIAT

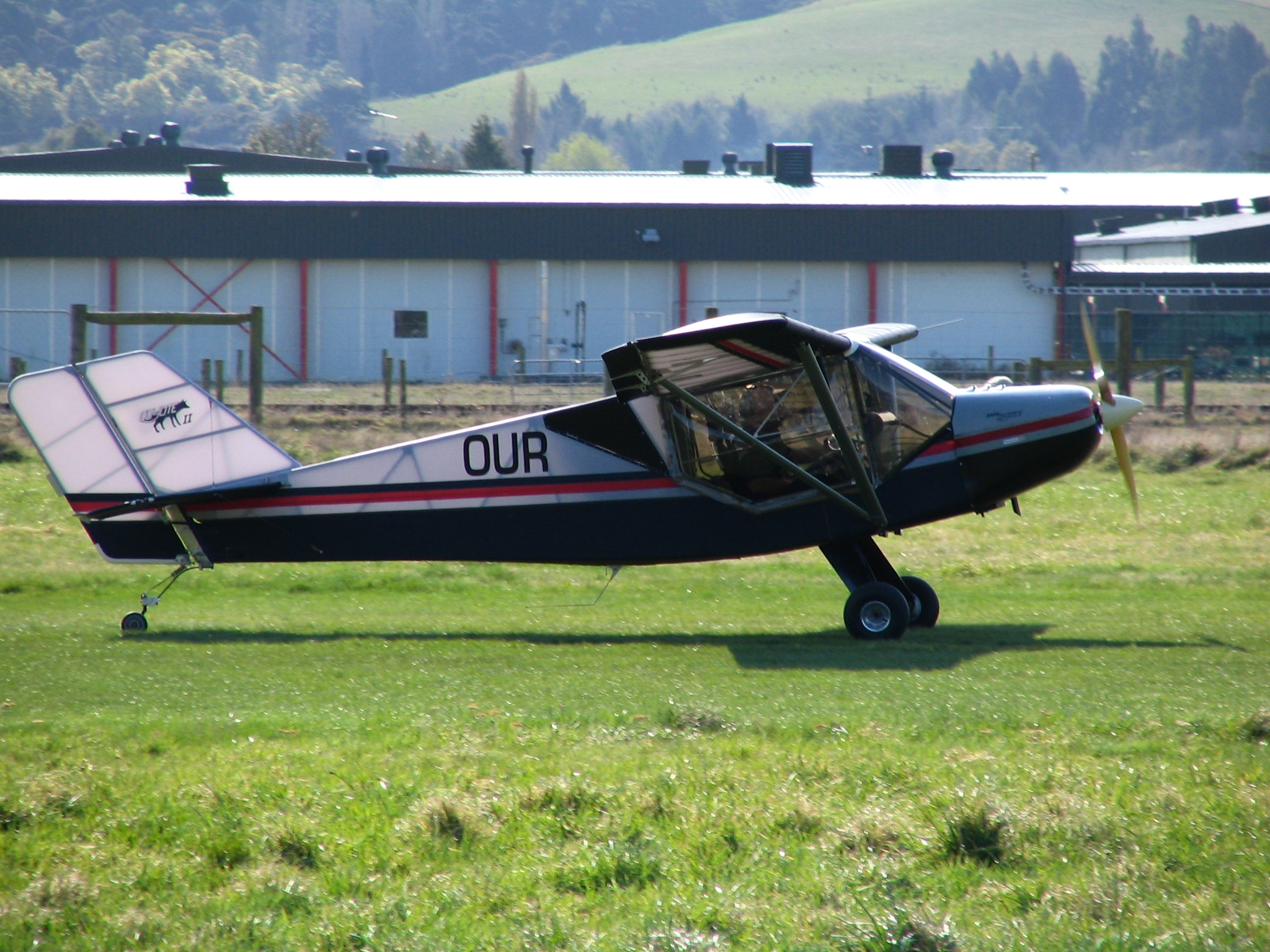
S-6ES with conventional landing gear.

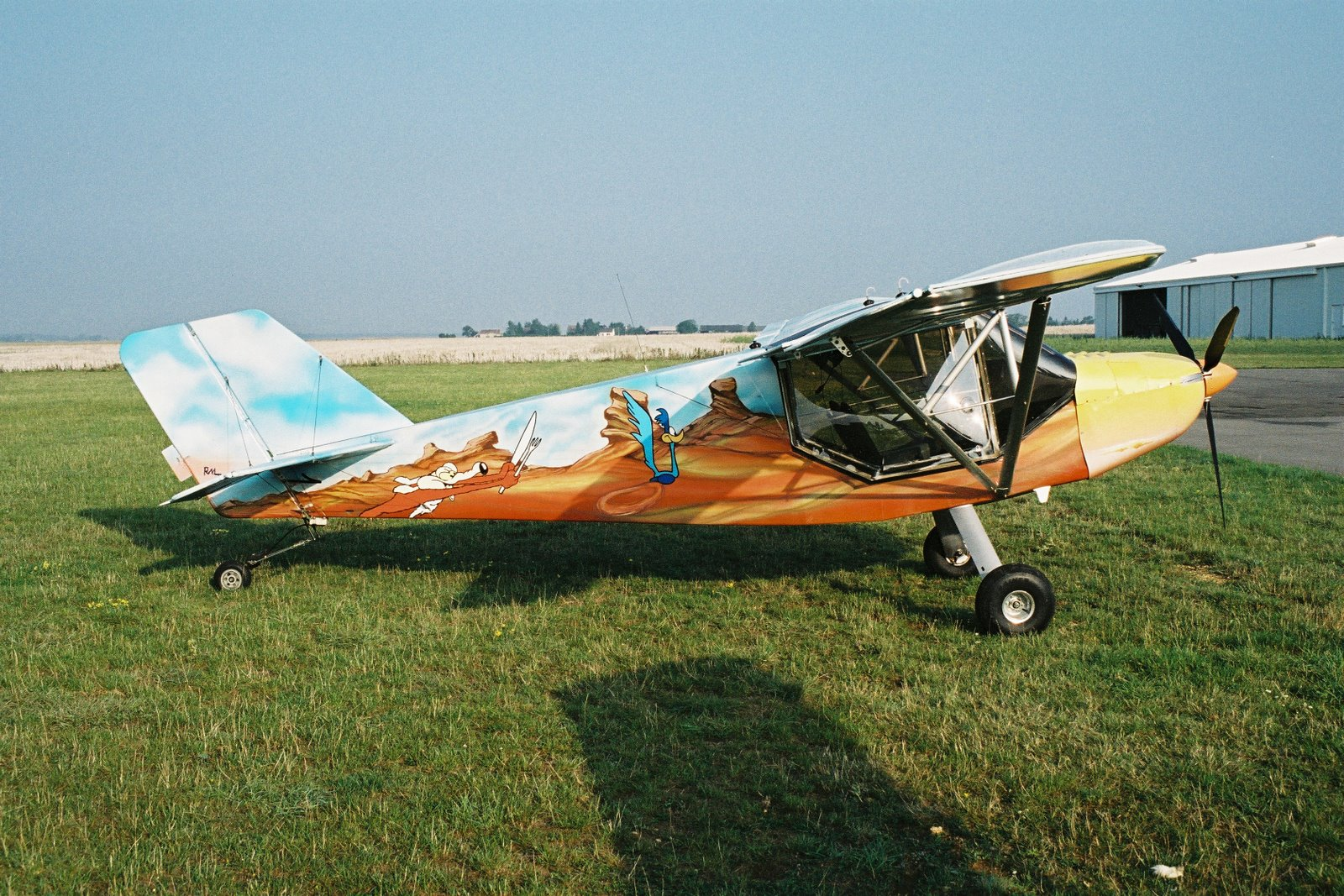
Rans Coyote 59CEC

S-6
Initial version, standard engine 50 hp (37 kW) Rotax 503. No longer in production.
S-6ES
Improved version with "extended span" wings introduced in April 1990. Standard engine is the 100 hp (75 kW) Rotax 912ULS. Available with standard wing, "116" wing and "light sport wing". In production in 2012.
S-6LS
Factory built light-sport aircraft version of the Coyote II. Standard engine is the 100 hp (75 kW) Rotax 912ULS and the 2010 base price is US$99,000.
S-6S Super Six
Improved version with dope and fabric covering, introduced in 1993. Standard engine is the 100 hp (75 kW) Rotax 912ULS. Available with standard wing, "116" wing and "light sport wing". In production in 2010.

== Specifications (S-6ES) ==
Data from Taylor 1996

General characteristics

- Crew: One
- Capacity: One passenger
- Length: 20 ft 0 in (6.10 m)
- Wingspan: 34 ft 6 in (10.52 m)
- Empty weight: 440 lb (200 kg)
- Gross weight: 930 lb (422 kg)
- Powerplant: 1 × Rotax 582 , 64 hp (48 kW)
- Propellers: 2-bladed wooden

Performance

- Maximum speed: 120 mph (190 km/h, 100 kn)
- Cruise speed: 90 mph (140 km/h, 78 kn)
- Range: 220 mi (350 km, 190 nmi)
- Rate of climb: 1,000 ft/min (5.1 m/s)

== See also ==
Aircraft of comparable role, configuration, and era

- Best Off Skyranger
- Cessna 150
- Denney Kitfox
- Fisher Dakota Hawk
- Fisher Horizon
- Murphy Maverick
- Murphy Rebel
- Piper PA-15 Vagabond
