= Need (song) =

Single by Keltiey

from the album B2B
- Released: July 21, 2022
- Recorded: 2021
- Genre: Pop; jersey club
- Label: Geffen; Cinematic
- Songwriter: Kelscie Moore
- Producers: 1jae; Jonny Shipes; Skaiwater

Keltiey singles chronology
"Need" (2022)	"Dumiri" (2022)

Music video
- "Need" on YouTube

"Need" is the debut single by the American musician Keltiey, originally released in 2021, later re-released on July 21, 2022, through Geffen Records. The production was handled by Jonny Shipes, 1jae and Skaiwater. It gained virality on social media platforms including TikTok. The track was later included in her debut studio album B2B (2023). Classified as a jersey club song, "Need" is reminiscent of fast pumps and fizzy synths.

== Composition ==
"Need" was originally released in 2021, later re-released on July 21, 2022, through Geffen Records. The song later gained virality on social media platforms including TikTok. The song is distinguished by its fast thumping and effervescent synths found in its Jersey dance beat. Keltiey composed the song in her bedroom.
