= 41xx steel =

Family of steel grades rich in molybdenum and chromium

Closeup of "cr-mo" branding on a steel road bicycle.

41xx steel is a family of SAE steel grades, as specified by the Society of Automotive Engineers (SAE). Alloying elements include chromium and molybdenum, and as a result these materials are often informally referred to as chromoly steel (common variant stylings include chrome-moly, cro-moly, CrMo, CRMO, CR-MOLY, and similar). They have an excellent strength to weight ratio and are considerably stronger and harder than standard 1020 steel, but are not easily welded, requiring thermal treatment both before and after welding to avoid cold cracking.

While these grades of steel do contain chromium, it is not in great enough quantities to provide the corrosion resistance found in stainless steel.

Examples of applications for 4130, 4140, and 4145 include structural tubing, bicycle frames, gas bottles for transportation of pressurized gases, firearm parts, clutch and flywheel components, and roll cages. 4150 stands out as being one of the steels accepted for use in M16 rifle and M4 carbine barrels by the United States military. These steels are also used in aircraft parts and therefore 42xx grade structural tubing is sometimes referred to as "aircraft tubing".

== Properties ==
Alloy composition by weight (%)
SAE grade	Cr	Mo	C (Note: The carbon composition of the alloy is denoted by the last two digits of the SAE specification number, in hundredths of a percent.)	Mn	P, max.	S, max.	Si
4118	0.40–0.60	0.08–0.15	0.18–0.23	0.70–0.90	0.035	0.040	0.15–0.35
4120	0.40–0.60	0.13–0.20	0.18–0.23	0.90–1.20	0.035	0.040	0.15–0.35
4121	0.45–0.65	0.20–0.30	0.18–0.23	0.75–1.00	0.035	0.040	0.15–0.35
4130	0.80–1.10	0.15–0.25	0.28–0.33	0.40–0.60	0.035	0.040	0.15–0.35
4135	0.80–1.10	0.15–0.25	0.33–0.38	0.70–0.90	0.035	0.040	0.15–0.35
4137	0.80–1.10	0.15–0.25	0.35–0.40	0.70–0.90	0.035	0.040	0.15–0.35
4140	0.80–1.10	0.15–0.25	0.38–0.43	0.75–1.00	0.035	0.040	0.15–0.35
4142	0.80–1.10	0.15–0.25	0.40–0.45	0.75–1.00	0.035	0.040	0.15–0.35
4145	0.80–1.10	0.15–0.25	0.43–0.48	0.75–1.00	0.035	0.040	0.15–0.35
4147	0.80–1.10	0.15–0.25	0.45–0.50	0.75–1.00	0.035	0.040	0.15–0.35
4150	0.80–1.10	0.15–0.25	0.48–0.53	0.75–1.00	0.035	0.040	0.15–0.35
4161	0.70–0.90	0.25–0.35	0.56–0.64	0.75–1.00	0.035	0.040	0.15–0.35

Mechanical properties
Material	Condition	Tensile strength	Yield strength	Elongation at fracture, 2-inch gauge [%]	Hardness, Rockwell
4130	Cold drawn, normalized	85–110 ksi (590–760 MPa)	70–85 ksi (480–590 MPa)	20–30	B 90–96
4142	Hot rolled, annealed	90–100 ksi (620–690 MPa)	60–70 ksi (410–480 MPa)	20–30	B 90–95
4142	Cold drawn, annealed	105–120 ksi (720–830 MPa)	85–95 ksi (590–660 MPa)	15–25	B 96–100
4150	Hot rolled, annealed	90–110 ksi (620–760 MPa)	65–75 ksi (450–520 MPa)	20–30	B 90–96

== Other characteristics ==
One of the characteristics of this class of steel is the ability to be case hardened by carburization of the surface. The core of the material retains its bulk properties, while the outer surface is significantly hardened to reduce wear and tear. This makes this grade of steel an excellent material for uses such as gears, piston pins, and crankshafts.

== 4140 Steel ==
4140 Steel (Quenched and Tempered) Mechanical Properties

Diameter	d ≤ 16	16 < d ≤ 40	40 < d ≤ 100	100 < d ≤ 160	160 < d ≤ 250
Thickness	t ≤ 8	8 < t ≤ 20	20 < t ≤ 60	60 < t ≤ 100	100 < t ≤ 160
Tensile Strength	160–190 ksi (1,100–1,300 MPa)	150–170 ksi (1,000–1,200 MPa)	130–160 ksi (900–1,100 MPa)	116–138 ksi (800–950 MPa)	109–131 ksi (750–900 MPa)
Yield Strength (Min)	130 ksi (900 MPa)	109 ksi (750 MPa)	94 ksi (650 MPa)	80 ksi (550 MPa)	73 ksi (500 MPa)
Elongation (% Min)	10	11	12	13	14
Reduction (% Min)	40	45	50	50	55
Impact Strength (J) ≥	-	26 ft⋅lbf (35 J)	26 ft⋅lbf (35 J)	26 ft⋅lbf (35 J)	26 ft⋅lbf (35 J)
