= Flyer Indústria Aeronáutica =

Airplane manufacturer in the Brazil

Flyer Indústria Aeronáutica, Ltda.
- Company type: Private
- Industry: Aerospace
- Founded: 1983; 43 years ago
- Founder: Nelson Luiz Gonçalves; Luiz Claudio Gonçalves
- Headquarters: Sumaré, São Paulo, Brazil
- Key people: Luiz Claudio Gonçalves (President and CEO)
- Products: Light aircraft; Light-sport aircraft; Ultralight plane
- Website: www.flyer.com.br

Flyer Indústria Aeronáutica, Ltda. is a Brazilian manufacturer of light aircraft headquartered in Sumaré, São Paulo.

== History ==
=== The beginning ===
Flyer Indústria Aeronáutica was founded in São Paulo city, in 1983 by Gonçalves brothers.

The history of Flyer began with the launch of the Flyer II, the first ultralight aircraft developed by the company. With a design similar to the renowned Quicksilver

=== The Flyer GT ===
In 1986, Flyer designed and manufactured the Flyer GT, a basic ultralight that became the most assembled in Brazil, with over 750 units produced. Flyer GT was discontinued. In the same year of its launch, Flyer also developed and produced the amphibious aircraft Hidroflyer, which remained in production until 2002.

In 1990, Flyer created Ultramotores, a specialized service center for aircraft equipped with ROTAX engines.

In 1991, Flyer inaugurated its factory in the city of Sumaré, state of São Paulo.

=== The Pelican 500BR ===
In 1998, Flyer established a partnership with the Canadian company Ultravia, resulting in the joint production of the Pelican 500BR in Brazil. By 2006, Flyer had produced 125 units of this model.

Flyer expanded its operations in 2004, starting the assembly of kits and aircraft from the renowned American company Van's Aircraft. The first assembled model was the RV-4.

In February 2005, Flyer acquired a 750 m² hangar at Americana Airport in São Paulo for flight tests.

In 2006, the Pelican 500BR reached the number 125 assembled aircraft.

In 2008, Flyer established a partnership with the American company The New Kolb Aircraft CO, resulting in obtaining the LSA (Light Sport Aircraft) certification for the Kolb Flyer aircraft.

In August 2008, Ultramotores, Flyer's partner company, opened a new hangar at Americana Airport.

== International market ==
In 2016, Flyer developed the Flyer F600 NG aircraft.

In 2020, Flyer initiated a commercial assistance program and began assembling Quick Builds for Van's Aircraft.

== Products ==
Ultralight Aircraft

- Super Coyote S6-S (Under license of Rans Aircraft)
- Pelican 500BR (Under license of Ultravia)
- Kolbflyer SS (Under license of Kolb Aircraft)
- F600NG

Light Sport Aircraft

- RV-7 (Under license of Van's Aircraft)
- RV-9 (Under license of Van's Aircraft)
- RV-10 (Under license of Van's Aircraft)
- RV-12 (Under license of Van's Aircraft)
- RV-14 (Under license of Van's Aircraft)

== See also ==
- New Kolb Aircraft
- Van's Aircraft
- Tecnam
- Companhia Aeronáutica Paulista

== Literature ==
- Tacke, W. Hrsg.: Flügel Welt Index, 2017–18, 2017, Flying Pages, EAN 4194047409950
