= RV10 =

RV10 may refer to:

- Mandala 10, the tenth mandala of the Rigveda
- RealVideo 10, a video codec
- Van's Aircraft RV-10, a kit aircraft
- Barricade RV-10, a toy in Hasbro's N-Strike series of Nerf Blasters
