= Aircraft Kit Industry Association =

American aviation association

- Type: Not for profit
- Founded: July 2012
- Founder: Dick VanGrunsven
- Defunct: c. July 2021
- Headquarters: Aurora State Airport, Oregon, United States
- Key people: President: John Monnett; Vice President: Dick VanGrunsven; Secretary: Dave Gustafson
- Members: 26 companies
- Website: www.akia.aero

The Aircraft Kit Industry Association (AKIA) was an American aviation advocacy association that was formed in July 2012 and formally constituted at AirVenture 2012.

The organization promoted the kit aircraft industry and advocated for allowing flight training in amateur-built aircraft as a means of reducing accidents in that sector of aviation. It also acted as a defender of the majority portion, or 51% rule, in amateur-built aircraft regulations, ensuring that the kit owners do the majority of the construction work.

== History ==
AKIA was formed as a result of pressure on the kit aircraft industry from both the Federal Aviation Administration and the National Transportation Safety Board regarding the poor safety record of amateur-built aircraft. The NTSB actually recommended that the kit industry form an association, something that had already begun, as well as aircraft type transition training for amateur-builts.

The organization was formed through a series of telephone conversations held in the spring of 2012 between kit aircraft manufacturers. They agreed that there were problems with industry stagnation, issues between the manufacturers, the FAA and the Experimental Aircraft Association and saw the need to pool their resources to address these problems. In particular, they needed a single voice to address potential regulatory changes that might be brought forward to address safety.

Speaking for the organization at AirVenture 2012, President & Founder Dick VanGrunsven stated on the subject of the kit aircraft accident record: "it's time we make our presence known and become proactive in addressing safety issues...more attention should be paid to the first pre-flight." He also singled out transition training for pilots buying kit aircraft and flight testing accidents. He concluded, "collectively, we have the knowledge and experience to make a difference in the culture."

In an interview in December 2012 VanGrunsven said "We see AKIA as being the key source of information and counsel for our industry and for the broader field of E-AB aircraft construction and operation. We have already established very positive contacts with EAA, FAA, NTSB, AOPA, SETP, GAMA and LAMA. We have common interests with all non-government groups, and with government agencies as well, because of our shared interests in aviation safety. We do not see ourselves as a threat to any because success within our industry only increases the aviation activity on which member organizations such as EAA and AOPA thrive."

By July 2021, AKIA had discontinued operations according to its website.

== Officers and advisors ==
The association's first officers included:

- President John Monnett
- Vice President Dick VanGrunsven
- Secretary Dave Gustafson

The advisory board consisted of:

- Frank Christensen
- Robert Goyer
- Dale Klapmeier
- Tom Poberezny

== Membership ==
The initial members were:

- Aircraft Spruce & Specialty Co
- Kitfox Aircraft
- Lancair
- Sonex Aircraft
- Van's Aircraft
- Wicks Aircraft Supply
- Zenith Aircraft Company
