= VanGrunsven RV-11 =

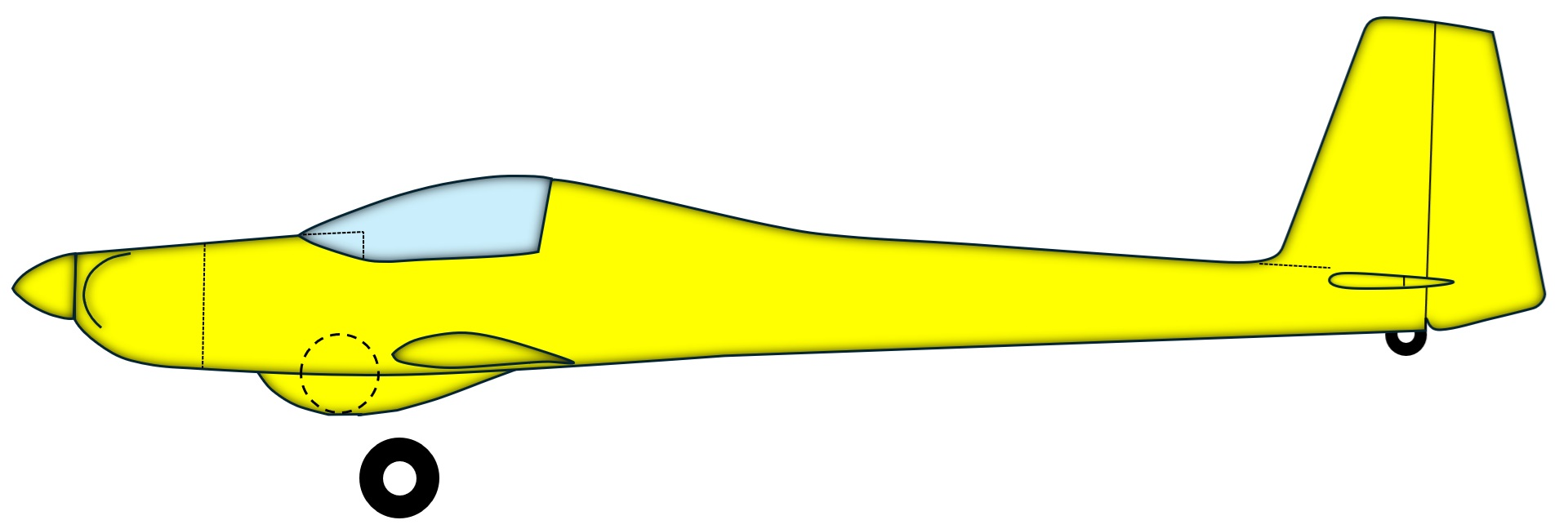
RV-11 side view

RV-11 being assembled

RV-11 is Richard VanGrunsven's designation for a proposed single-seat touring motor glider design similar in layout to the AMS Carat. Most touring motor gliders are two-seaters; VanGrunsven felt that the lower drag and weight of a single-seater would allow for superior performance.

Although the designation is the 11th in the Van's Aircraft “RV” series, the RV-11 is not a company project. Rather, it is Richard VanGrunsven’s “personal pet project”, being designed and built at his home in his spare time.

The prototype RV-11 uses the wings of an HP-18 sailplane mated to a specially built fuselage. A Jabiru 2200 was installed in the nose. The panel features an I-K Technologies AIM-1 display and a MicroAir radio. The canopy is the aft half of an RV-4 canopy, rotated 180 degrees so as to face forward. Construction is all-metal, except for the PVC ribs in the HP-18 wings and - as is typical in RVs - some small fiberglass components such as the engine cowl and prop spinner.

The RV-11’s single main landing gear is similar to those of a DC-3, retracting up and forward, “half way” into a pod-like fairing on the underside of the belly.

VanGrunsven first announced the RV-11 in an issue of the RVator newsletter published in 2000. In a 2002 issue, VanGrunsven reported that the prototype was “perhaps 80% complete”. Later issues included photos of the build. In 2022, at an EAA event to celebrate the 50 years of Van's Aircraft, VanGrunsven showed recent photos and reported that, although the airplane has not yet been completed, further progress has been made.

== See also ==
- AMS Carat
- Task Silhouette
- Schreder HP-18
