= VanGrunsven RV-5 =

1970s prototype airplane

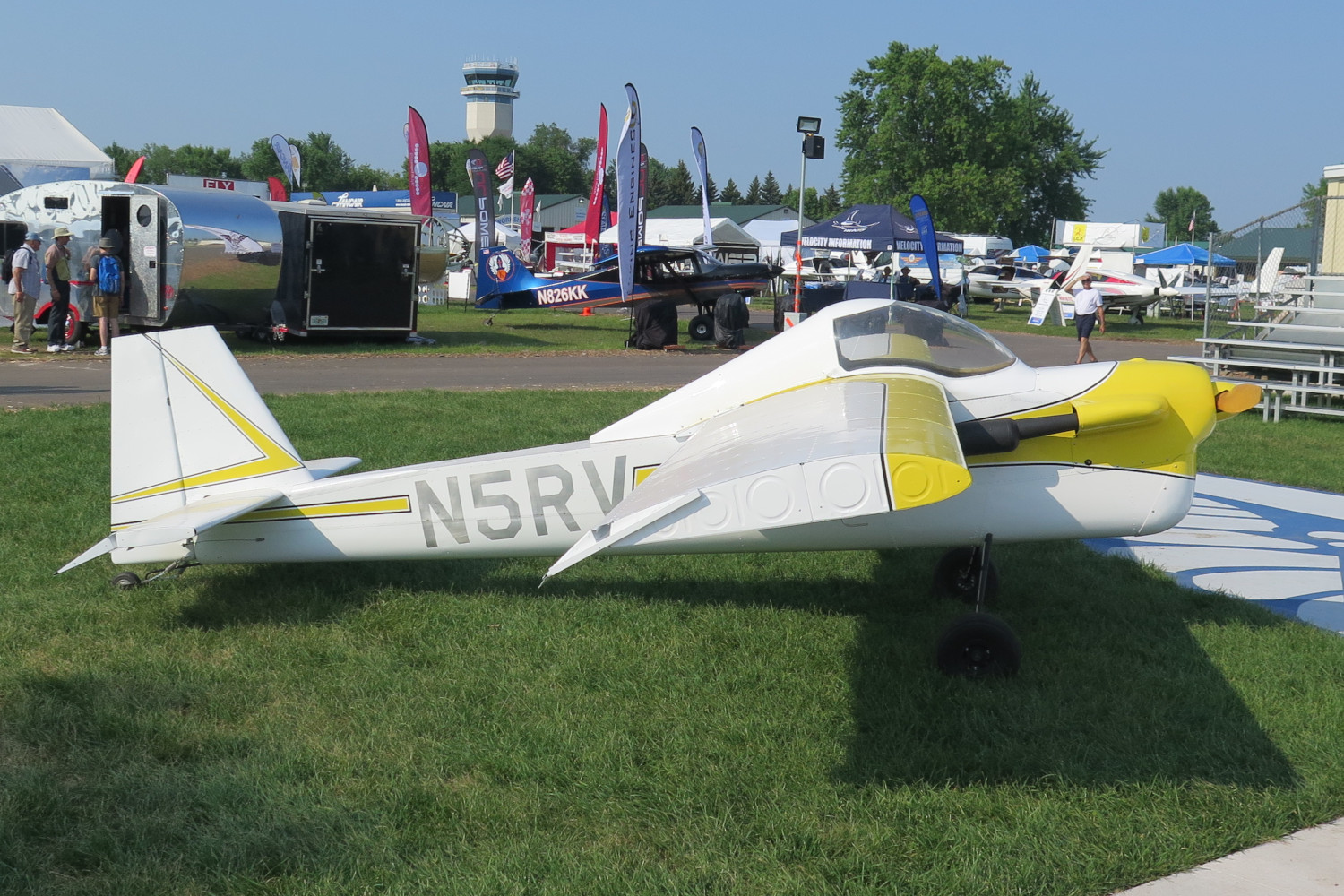
Vans Aircraft RV-5 at EAA AirVenture

RV-5 with wings rotated to "scissor" mode, for storage or ground transport

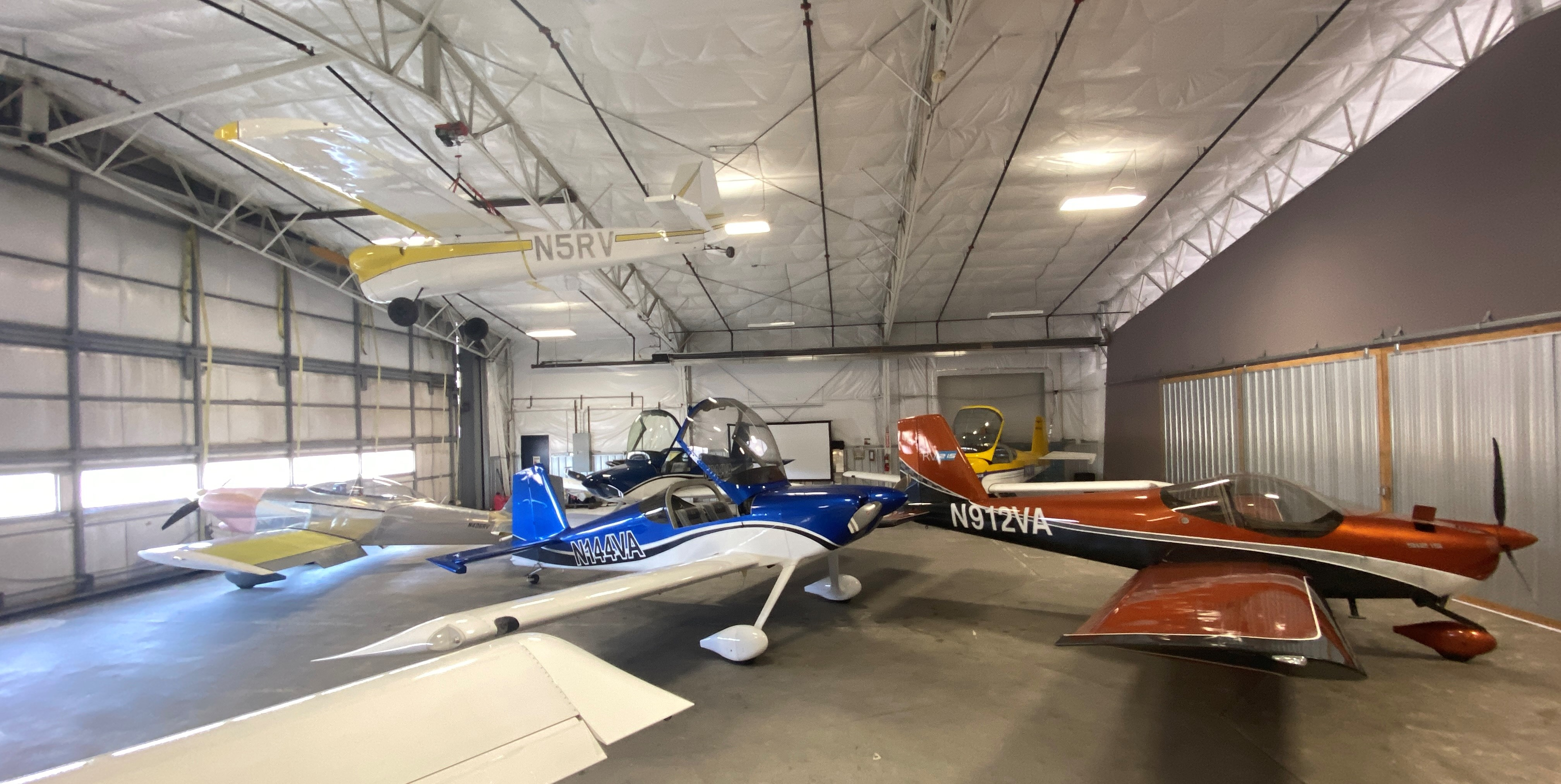
RV-5 hanging at Van's Aircraft demo hangar

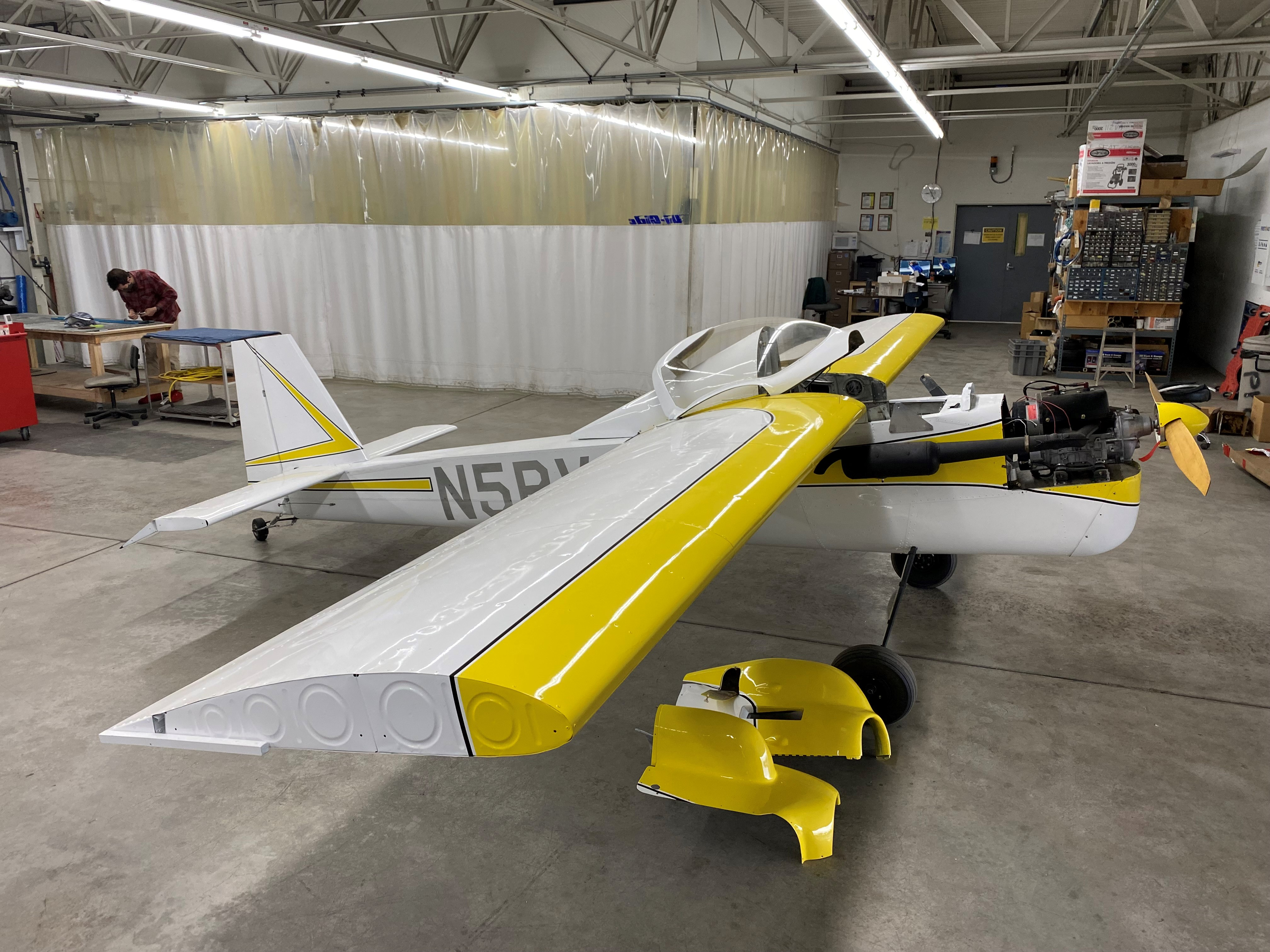
VanGrunsven RV-5 at Van's Aircraft prototype shop

RV-5 is a one-off proof-of-concept prototype airplane designed by Richard VanGrunsven. Although the designation is the 5th in the Van's Aircraft "RV" series, the RV-5 was never intended as a production aircraft but as a project for VanGrunsven and fellow members of his Experimental Aircraft Association (EAA) chapter.

The RV-5 has a single seat, a shoulder-mounted wing, full-span flaperons, fixed landing gear in a conventional configuration, and all-metal structure – mostly 0.016 in (0.41 mm) aluminum. The airplane originally flew in the summer of 1976 with a 30 hp half-VW engine, and was later re-engined with a 41 hp Rotax 447. The straight, untapered wings use a flat-bottomed NACA 4414 airfoil. The canopy was initially designed and fabricated for the RV-2.

For storage and ground transportation, the front spar can be disconnected from the fuselage, then the "scissor-wing" can pivot 90 degrees about a bolt on the rear spar, at which point the flat bottom of one wing will rest on the flat upper surface of the fuselage. This is similar to the storage configuration later used on the Bell Boeing V-22 Osprey.

The airplane was designed in light of the 1970s energy crisis, to explore how much performance could be achieved with the use of an engine with very low fuel burn. A member of EAA Chapter 105 developed the first "half VW" airplane engine - i.e. an engine that uses two of the four cylinders of a Volkswagen air-cooled engine – and wanted to test it on a light airframe. Richard VanGrunsven, a member of Chapter 105, designed the airplane and led the chapter in its construction and testing from 1975 to 1976.

In 1984, Richard's brother Jerry VanGrunsven borrowed the airplane and took it to his airpark home near Seattle. Most of the subsequent hours on the airplane were flown by Jerry and his two sons.

From 2017 to 2019, the RV-5 was restored and then displayed at EAA AirVenture Oshkosh. It is currently on display, hanging from the ceiling beams of the hangar that houses Van's Aircraft's factory-demo fleet of airplanes.

== Specifications ==
Data from Sandwich board at EAA AirVenture 2019

General characteristics

- Crew: 1
- Length: 16 ft 7.5 in (5.067 m)
- Wingspan: 20 ft (6.1 m)
- Wing area: 75 sq ft (7.0 m^{2})
- Airfoil: NACA 4414
- Empty weight: 312 lb (142 kg)
- Gross weight: 577 lb (262 kg)
- Fuel capacity: over 10 US gallons
- Powerplant: 1 × Rotax 447

Performance

- Maximum speed: 125 mph (201 km/h, 109 kn)
- Cruise speed: 90 mph (140 km/h, 78 kn) economy
- Stall speed: 41 mph (66 km/h, 36 kn) flaps down
- Rate of climb: 1,200 ft/min (6.1 m/s) +
- Take-off run: 175 ft (53 m)
- Landing run: 300 ft (91 m)
- 75%-power cruise speed: over 100 mph
- Fuel consumption, economy cruise: 3 gph

== See also ==
- Colomban Cri-cri
- Hummel Bird
