= VanGrunsven RV-2 =

American glider

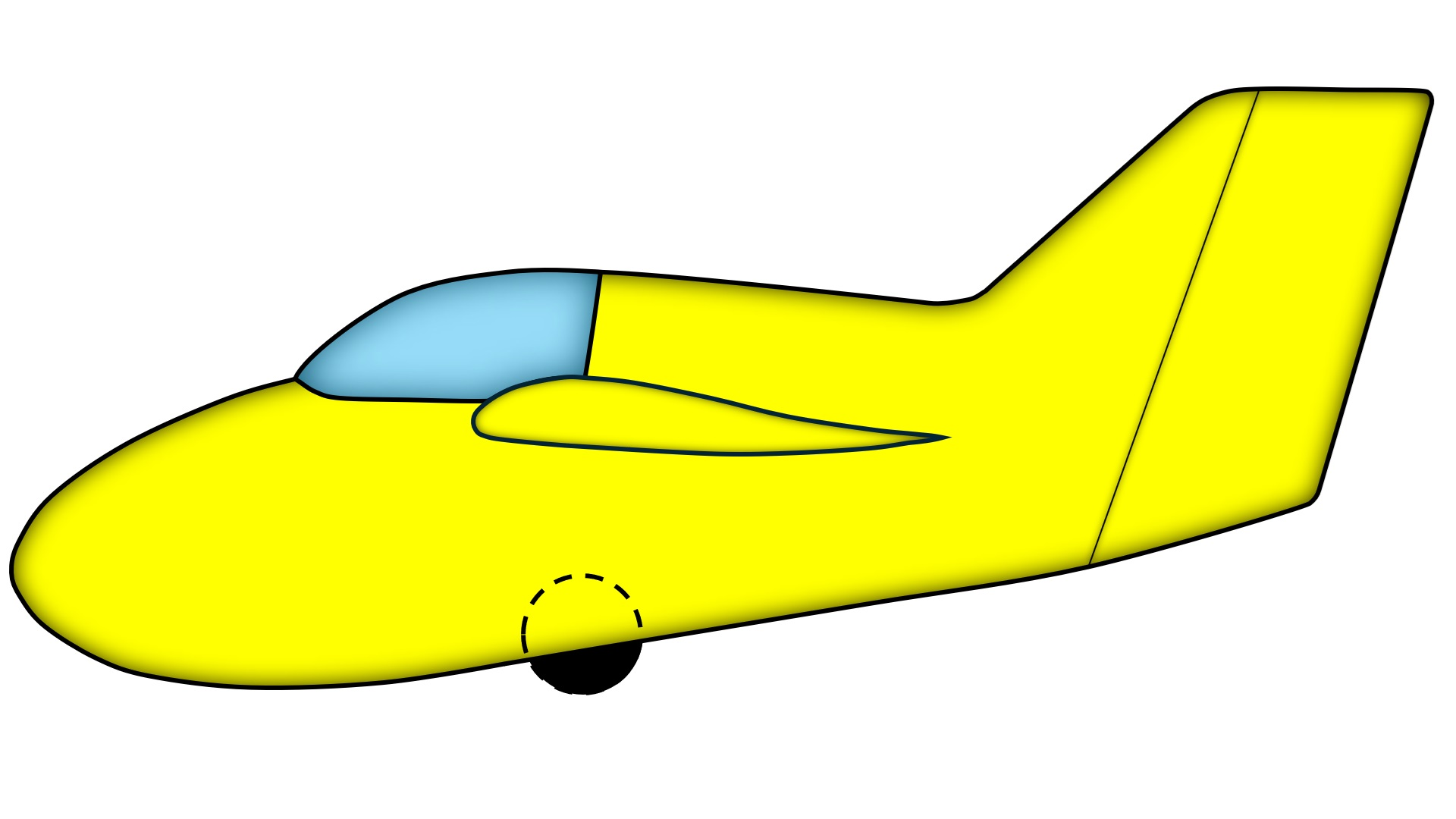
Side view of VanGrunsven RV-2 glider

RV-2 wooden wing structure

RV-2 is Richard VanGrunsven’s designation for a proposed single-seat tailless glider with all-wood structure and a 40-foot wingspan. The airplane has same configuration as the Backstrom EPB-1C and Marske XM-1D, although with a swept vertical stabilizer similar to that of the Marske Pioneer.

Fabrication and assembly of the wooden wings were almost completed. However, the project did not progress beyond this point, being indefinitely paused in the early 1970s in favor of the development of the RV-3 and the founding and running of Van's Aircraft. The canopy originally fabricated for the RV-2 was later used on the RV-5.

== See also ==
- Backstrom EPB-1C
- Marske XM-1D
