= Flyer F600 NG =

Brazilian ultralight aircraft

General information
- Type: Ultralight aircraft
- Manufacturer: Flyer Indústria Aeronáutica

History
- First flight: 23 November 2016

The Flyer F600 NG is an ultralight aircraft from the Brazilian manufacturer Flyer Industria Aeronáutica, Eireli.

== Design and development ==
The Flyer F600 NG is a modern further development of the Kolb Flyer developed by the US-American Homer Kolb in the 1970s, the beginning of ultralight aviation, as well as the Flyer GT which emerged from it and was built by the company in about 750 copies.

The aircraft is designed as a strutted shoulder-wing with a conventional tail unit and has a fixed nose wheel landing gear. The cabin, with two tandem seat, can be entered through side doors.

== Specifications ==
Data from Flyer Indústria Aeronáutica

General characteristics

- Crew: One
- Capacity: Two
- Length: 6.30 m (20 ft 8 in)
- Wingspan: 9.75 m (32 ft 0 in)
- Height: 2.50 m (8 ft 2 in)
- Wing area: 10.8 m^{2} (116 sq ft)
- Empty weight: 350 kg (772 lb)
- Gross weight: 600 kg (1,323 lb)
- Powerplant: 1 × Rotax-912-ULS boxer engine, 75 kW (100 hp)
- Propellers: 3-bladed Sensenich

Performance

- Maximum speed: 213 km/h (132 mph, 115 kn)
- Cruise speed: 108 km/h (67 mph, 58 kn)
- Range: 1,110 km (690 mi, 600 nmi)
- Service ceiling: 3,500 m (11,500 ft)
