= Van's Aircraft RV-15 =

American light kit airplane

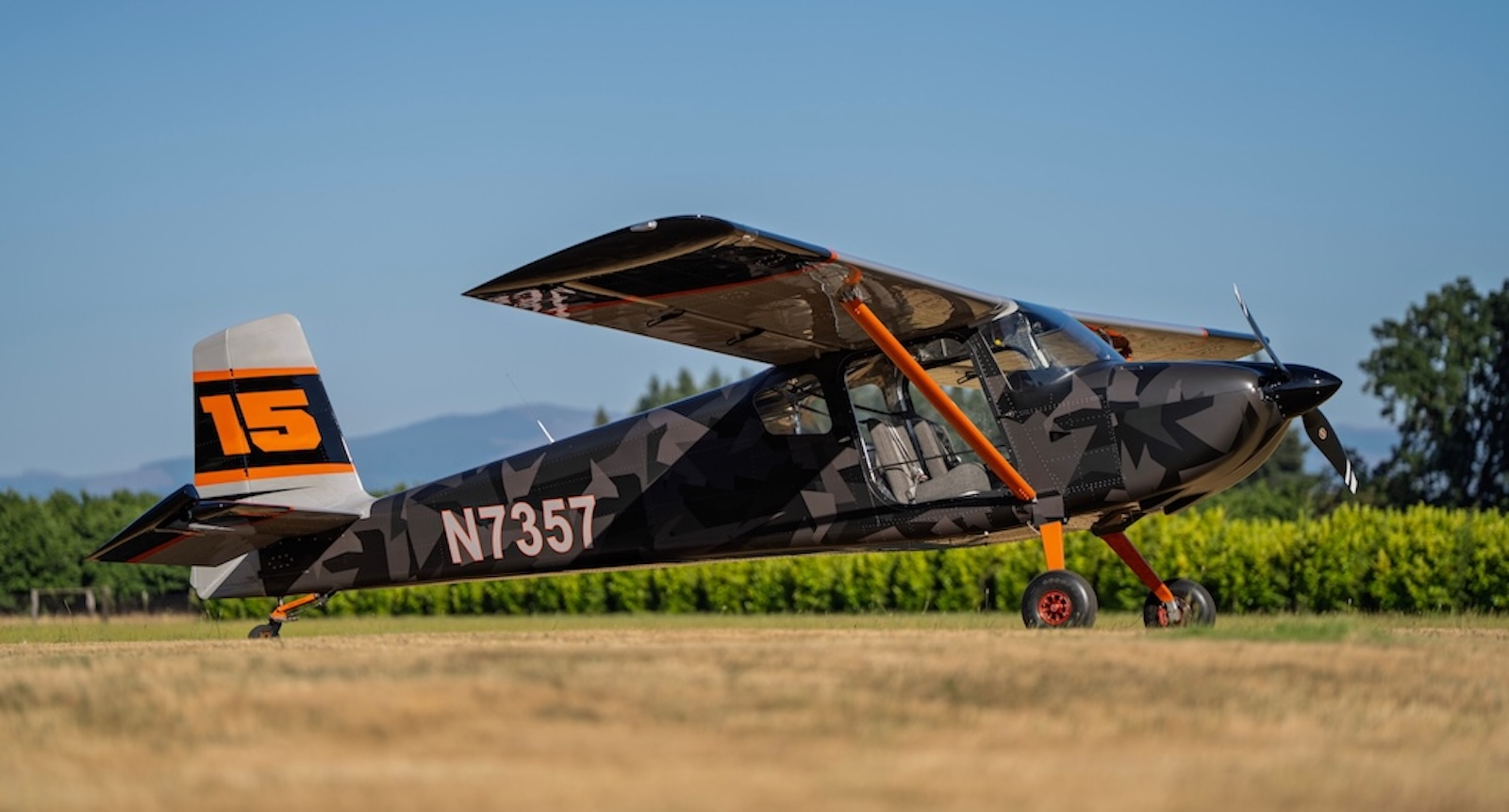
The RV-15 prototype, July 2025.

The Van's Aircraft RV-15 is an American amateur-built aircraft that is under development by Van's Aircraft of Aurora, Oregon. It was first publicly shown at the AirVenture airshow in July 2022. The aircraft is supplied as a kit for amateur construction, and as of July 2025 the company began accepting deposits for the initial sub kit, the RV-15 wing kit, with wing kit deliveries planned to start in December, 2025. The company announced a schedule on which it plans to accept orders for the remaining kits (tail, fuselage, finish, and firewall-forward kits) though summer, 2026.

== Development ==
The RV-15 is the first high-wing design for the manufacturer, a company known for its low-wing aircraft. The design was developed based on input from customers. Development was started with a "pine pigeon" wooden mock-up.

The aircraft was designed by a 12-person engineering team starting in 2019. The design team included Van's chief engineer and past president Rian Johnson; Rob Heap, formerly of Scaled Composites and also Cessna; Brian Hickman formerly of Glasair Aviation and Axel Alvarez, a civilian graduate of the United States Naval Test Pilot School.

The prototype was constructed from computer assisted design parts utilizing matched-hole technology, with punch presses and computer numerical control machines working directly from the engineering design drawings.

The first flight was in June 2022 and the engineering prototype was first publicly shown at AirVenture 2022 in July 2022. At AirVenture in July 2025, the company announced that kit production had commenced, with initial kit deliveries planned to start at the end of 2025.

By the end of January 2023, the aircraft had been substantially re-designed as a result of feedback from the flight test program. Changes include a new wing design with a different internal structure, located further aft; a wider aft fuselage; a more sloped windshield; relocated landing gear and a relocated flap handle from the cockpit ceiling to the floor. Wing tank fuel capacity was increased from 50 to 60 U.S. gallons (190 to 230 L; 42 to 50 imp gal).

The developmental prototype aircraft was again brought to AirVenture in July 2023 and again in July 2025, and included many more evolutionary design changes incorporated. These included: a greater span stabilator with wider, trimmable anti-servo tabs (2023) and a conventional tail with horizontal stabilizer and elevator (2025); re-worked ailerons with shifted hinge points; improved control harmonization, including removal of the rudder counterbalance to reduce sensitivity; plus the engine cant increased to 2.2° down. In 2025 the new final wing with integral fuel tanks was incorporated. The final design will include a new strut design, a new fuselage design with the wing located further back, the ability to accept smaller engines, new door design, and a new further aft main landing gear position. The company started accepting deposits for wing kits and estimated pricing and timing for all of the kits was announced during AirVenture 2025.

== Design ==
The aircraft features a strut-braced high-wing, a two-seats-in-side-by-side configuration enclosed cabin accessed by doors, fixed conventional landing gear with tundra tires and an internal shock absorbing mechanism, plus a single engine in tractor configuration. A tricycle landing gear version and an option for water floats are also planned.

The aircraft is made from aluminum sheet, with a composite engine cowling. Its wing employs a Steve Smith custom airfoil and mounts large Fowler flaps. The design engine power range is 180 to 225 hp (134 to 168 kW) and the standard engine used is the 218 hp (163 kW) Lycoming IO-390-EXP119 four-stroke powerplant, driving an 80-inch Hartzell Propeller Trailblazer three-blade, constant-speed propeller. The Lycoming O-360 will be an option.

The current tail is a conventional elevator type (previously the design evaluated an all-flying stabilator type with a trim tab plus an anti-servo tab).

The main and tailwheels use suspension made by Monster Shocks of Lincoln, California.

The rudder uses cable controls, while the stabilator and ailerons use push-pull tubes. The flaps will likely end up as cable-operated and were initially intended to have a cockpit ceiling-mounted flap actuation handle, later changed to a floor-mounted handle.

The prototype crew doors are steel-tube frames with Plexiglas. There is a large baggage compartment planned behind the seats, accessed via an external door.

The aircraft has a design goal cruising speed of 140 kn (259 km/h).

== Operational history ==
By July 2022, one example had been registered in the United States with the Federal Aviation Administration, the engineering test prototype, indicated as an RV-8X.

In a review written at the factory while trying out the incomplete prototype, KitPlanes writer Paul Dye noted, "Visibility from the cockpit on the ground appears to be excellent. Comparing it to similar taildragging high-wings, I’d have to say that it is superior to most. The upright seating allows you to easily move your head forward to see around the forward door post if required to see what’s coming up in a turn. And the view over the top cowl was excellent for taxiing. The design eye height is fairly high in the cockpit, and an extra cushion (on top of the temporary seats) was required to get my average height up to that level—but once I did, it sort of felt like I was sitting in an Air Tractor, casually surveying a large domain. I liked it!"

An Aircraft Owners and Pilots Association review by Dave Hirschman noted, "Van’s officials are notoriously tight-lipped about the RV–15's performance figures, but they did say they set ambitious design goals and they expect the new airplane to meet them. For example, they wanted the RV–15 to take off and land in 400 feet or less, and have a top speed in level flight of at least 140 knots."

== Specifications ==
Data from KitPlanes

General characteristics

- Crew: one
- Capacity: one passenger
- Airfoil: Steve Smith custom
- Gross weight: 2,050 lb (930 kg)
- Fuel capacity: 50 U.S. gallons (190 L; 42 imp gal) expected
- Powerplant: 1 × Lycoming IO-390 four cylinder, air-cooled, four stroke aircraft engine, 218 hp (163 kW)
- Propellers: 3-bladed Hartzell Propeller Trailblazer constant-speed propeller

Performance

- Cruise speed: 140 kn (160 mph, 260 km/h) (design goal)
