= Van's Aircraft RV-12 =

American kit aircraft

RV-12
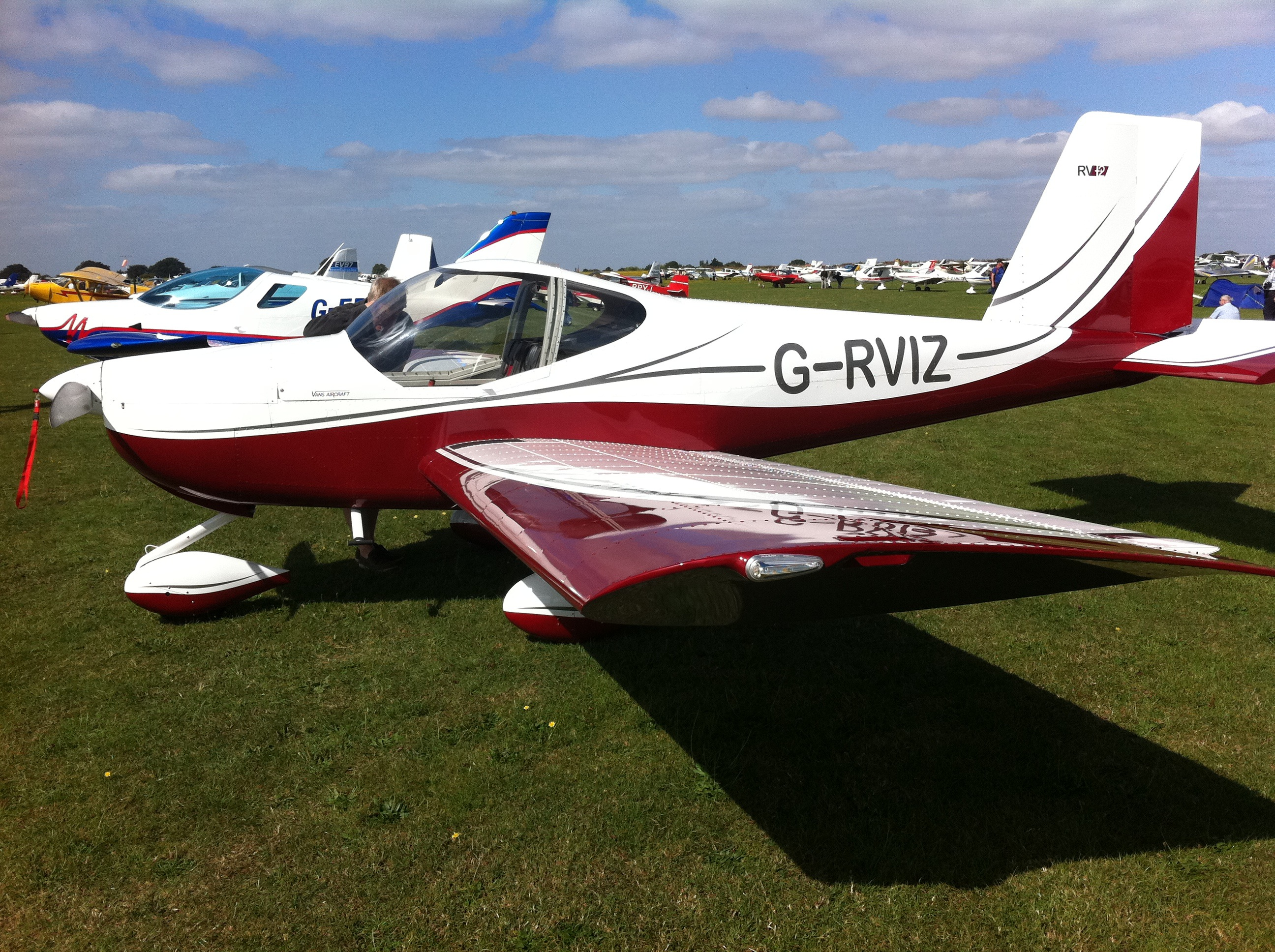

General information
- Type: Light-sport aircraft
- National origin: United States
- Manufacturer: Van's Aircraft
- Designer: Richard VanGrunsven
- Status: Kits and complete aircraft both in production (2021)
- Number built: 792 (July 2023)

History
- Manufactured: 2008–present (kits); 2012–present (complete aircraft)
- Introduction date: 2008
- First flight: November 9, 2006

The Van's RV-12 is an American two-seat, single-engine, low-wing homebuilt airplane eligible for the U.S. E-LSA category, sold in kit form and as a complete ready-to-fly aircraft by Van's Aircraft of Aurora, Oregon.

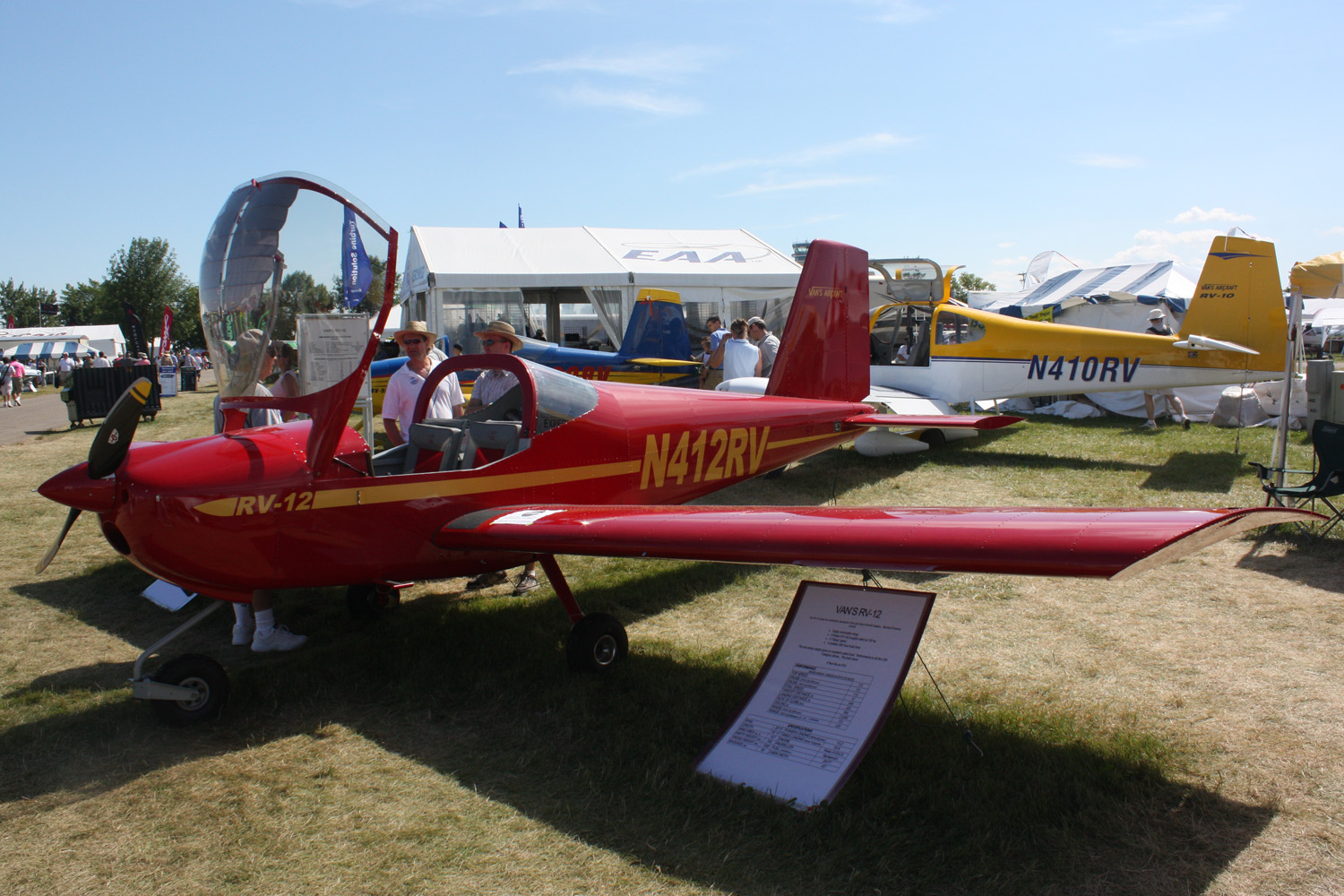
The first RV-12, built by Richard VanGrunsven, at Oshkosh 2008.

The RV-12 had its first flight on November 9, 2006. Deliveries of partial kits commenced in April 2008 and, as of July 2023, 792 aircraft have been completed and flown.

== Design and development ==
Two RV-12 wings under construction in a garage.

The completed detachable wings stored in a wing stand.

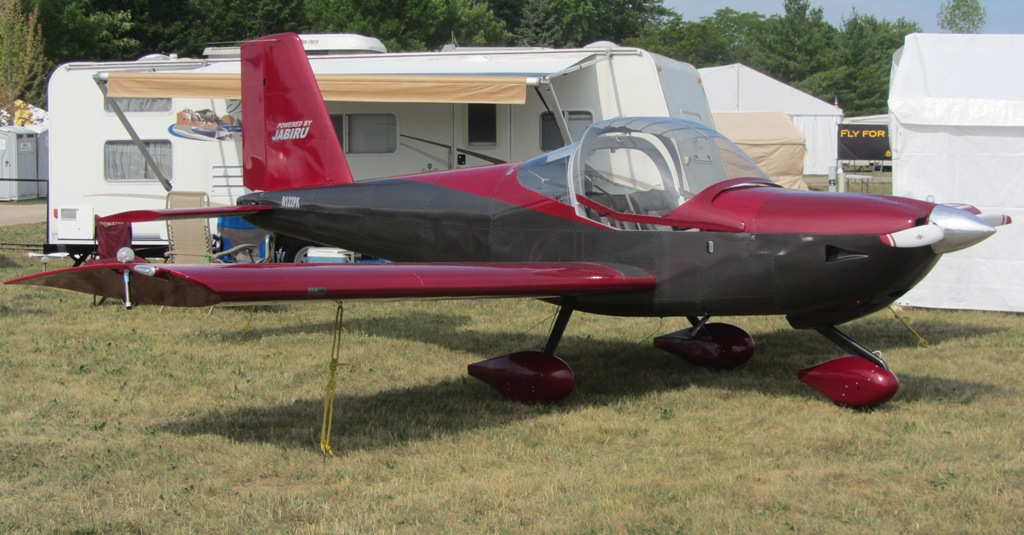
RV-12 with Jabiru engine

The architect of the line of Van's aircraft, Richard VanGrunsven, designed the RV-12 with several specific goals in mind. These include:

- Flying qualities equal to or better than the standard set by the RV-9A
- 550 lb (249 kg) payload – to carry a projected load of two 190 lb (86 kg) people, 120 lb (54 kg) of fuel (20 U.S. gallons (76 L; 17 imp gal)) and 50 lb (23 kg) of baggage or cargo.
- 750 lb (340 kg) aircraft empty weight
- Cabin width of 43 in (109 cm)
- A low parts count, with an aim of reducing kit cost and construction time
- Minimal use of composites and maximum use of aluminum
- Maximum use of simple hand tools only for construction

The LSA class limits aircraft to a maximum takeoff weight of 1,320 lb (599 kg), a maximum clean, stall speed with no flaps of 51 mph (45 knots) and a maximum level speed of 138 mph (120 knots) and the production RV-12 falls within those maximum limits.

The prototype incorporated several new features for an RV-series aircraft including: removable wings, full-span flaperons and an all-moving stabilator. It is intended that the RV-12 will be powered by a Rotax 912ULS engine of 100 hp and equipped with a Sensenich composite ground-adjustable propeller, although as a kit aircraft the builder can complete it as they choose.

Originally, the RV-12 was equipped with the Dynon FlightDEK-D180, the Garmin GPS 496, Garmin SL-40, Garmin GTX-327 Transponder, and the Flightcom 403 intercom. The RV-12 avionics kit now comes with the choice of either the 10" Dynon SkyView D-1000 or the Garmin G3X Touch avionics packages. Either package includes synthetic vision, Mode-S transponder, and mapping to replace the Garmin GPS Map 496, and a Garmin GTR 200 to replace the SL-40 transceiver and FliteCom intercom.

Van's aircraft has many optional packages for the RV-12. These options do not change the E-LSA licensing. A lighting package is available, two-axis autopilot, interior package (sidewall covers, carpet, different colors), and wheel fairings to protect the wheels and increase the speed a few knots.

The aircraft received S-LSA approval in July, 2009 making it possible for home builders to license it in either the E-LSA category, simplifying certification requirements, or the experimental, amateur-built category.

The RV-12 is the first production kit from Van's that is predominantly constructed using blind rivets, which allows the majority of the construction to be done without an assistant. The use of computerized punch machines to punch out most of the rivet holes to final size simplifies construction by minimizing the need to deburr or final size most of the rivet holes. Since the wings are designed to be detached, the majority of the airplane can be constructed in most standard residential garages.

The RV-12 is sold as six sub-kits: wings, fuselage, empennage & tailcone, finishing (cowling, wiring, canopy, etc.), powerplant, and avionics. Van's indicates that they cannot "provide assistance or advice on any deviations from the supplied parts and assembly instructions".

Partial RV-12 kits became available to customers in April 2008, with complete kits made available in the fall of 2008.

In November 2014 Van's Aircraft and Dynon announced that a two-screen glass cockpit option was available for the RV-12. This can be installed on new-build aircraft and also retro-fitted to aircraft already in service with a single screen.

A new variant, the RV-12iS, was introduced in 2017. The RV-12iS is an incremental improvement over the RV-12 which allows the installation of the Rotax 912ULS (carbureted) or the Rotax 912iS (fuel-injected) engines. It also incorporates a new cowling and throttle quadrant design, quick-retracting flaps, a quick-adjusting seat, redesigned landing gear attachments and fuel tank, among other improvements.

At AirVenture in July 2025, multiple design updates were revealed for the 2026 models. In anticipation of ASTM LSA rule updates to allow flight into IMC, a heated pitot was added in a more traditional under-wing mount, replacing the plastic pitot tube which passed through the spinner. In order to cope with the increased electrical requirements, a 30A BLDC generator was added to the vacuum pump pad on the back of the engine gearbox. A parking brake was added as an option, replacing the previous method of using the towbar to press against the brake pedals when parked. Fuel pumps were updated to the latest design from Rotax to avoid vapor lock in hot/high conditions. The interior features seats with more comfortable foam, a new central armrest features a dedicated emergency hammer holder, and a tray was added to beneath the instrument panel for stowing the POH.

=== Production ===
In October 2012, Van's announced that the company would produce a limited run of twelve fully assembled RV-12s, sold as Special Light-sport Aircraft (SLSAs). The aircraft were assembled from production kits by Synergy Air, with the "Signature Edition" RV-12s costing US$115,000. The run of 12 aircraft was sold out within hours of the announcement and the first one was delivered on 31 May 2013.

In November 2013, the company announced that a follow-up batch of twelve RV-12s, again to be assembled by Synergy Air, would be sold fully equipped for US$123,000 or US$115,000 for the base model. Synergy Air indicated that they expect to produce about 50 aircraft per year on an ongoing basis.

In August 2018, Van's announced that they would move production of the SLSA RV-12 from Synergy to the Van's factory, with Synergy continuing as a builder assist center.

== Operational history ==
An RV-12 was built by students of Emirates airline to enhance their knowledge and hands-on technical experience, and is used to promote the airline training programmes. The airplane, painted in livery of the Emirates airline, is exhibited in the Emirates Engineering Centre at the Dubai International Airport and was displayed at the 2013 Dubai Airshow.

== Specifications (RV-12is) ==
Data from: Van's Aircraft website

General characteristics

- Crew: one pilot
- Capacity: one passenger
- Length: 19 ft 11 in (6.07 m)
- Wingspan: 26 ft 9 in (8.15 m)
- Height: 8 ft 4 in (2.54 m)
- Wing area: 127 sq ft (11.8 m^{2})
- Empty weight: 755 lb (342 kg)
- Gross weight: 1,320 lb (599 kg)
- Max takeoff weight: 1,320 lb (599 kg)
- Powerplant: 1 × Rotax 912iS with a Sensenich composite ground-adjustable propeller, 100 hp (74 kW)

Performance

- Maximum speed: 135 mph (217 km/h, 117 kn) at sea level
- Cruise speed: 135 mph (217 km/h, 117 kn) (7500 ft @ 5500 rpm)
- Stall speed: 47 mph (76 km/h, 41 kn)
- Never exceed speed: 156 mph (251 km/h, 136 kn)
- Range: 659 mi (893 km, 573 nmi) at cruise 55% power
- Service ceiling: 19,200 ft (5,900 m)
- Rate of climb: 1,000 ft/min (5.1 m/s)
- Wing loading: 10.4 lb/sq ft (51 kg/m^{2})

== See also ==
Related development

- Van's Aircraft RV-9

Aircraft of comparable role, configuration, and era

- CZAW SportCruiser
- Europa XS
- Grumman American AA-1
- Rans S-19 Venterra
- The Airplane Factory Sling 2
- Thorp T-18
