= Diemech TP 100 =

American turboprop engine

TP 100
- Type: Turboprop and turboshaft aircraft engine
- National origin: United States
- Manufacturer: Diemech Turbine Solutions

The Diemech TP 100 is an American turboprop and turboshaft aircraft engine that was under development by Diemech Turbine Solutions of DeLand, Florida in 2012.

By June 2017 the company website had been taken down and it is likely that the company is out of business and engine development cancelled.

== Design and development ==
The TP 100 was developed from an engine developed by PBS Velká Bíteš of the Czech Republic for use in UAVs. The design goal was to provide an engine that could run on globally available fuels, such as Jet-A or ultra-low-sulfur diesel, given the disappearance of avgas in most parts of the world.

The TP 100 develops 241 hp (180 kW) and weighs 125 lb (57 kg) plus accessories. The engine was expected to produce a specific fuel consumption of 0.82 lb/hph (0.5 kg/kWh), yielding a cruise fuel flow of 21 U.S. gallons (79 L; 17 imp gal) per hour which would have been 52% more than the equivalent piston engine, the Lycoming IO-540, which produces the same power at a SFC of 0.45, burning 12.7 U.S. gallons (48 L; 10.6 imp gal) per hour. In examining these numbers AVweb editor Paul Bertorelli stated that this "illuminates the harsh fact that turbine engines just aren't as efficient as piston engines and the smaller the turbines are, the less efficient they are".

The company had planned to work with PBS to obtain Federal Aviation Administration certification in the US. The engine was expected to fly first in mid-2013 on a Van's Aircraft RV-10 testbed, but development ended before the engine was flown.

By 2022 PBS Velká Bíteš was offering the TP 100 for sale as the non-certified PBS TP100 Turboprop Engine "for small aircraft and unmanned aerial vehicles".

== Specifications (TP 100) ==
Data from AVweb

==== General characteristics ====
- Type: Turboprop and turboshaft
- Length:
- Diameter:
- Dry weight: 125 lb (57 kg) without accessories

==== Components ====
- Compressor:

==== Performance ====
- Maximum power output: 241 hp (180 kW)
