= Van's Aircraft RV-10 =

American kit aircraft

RV-10
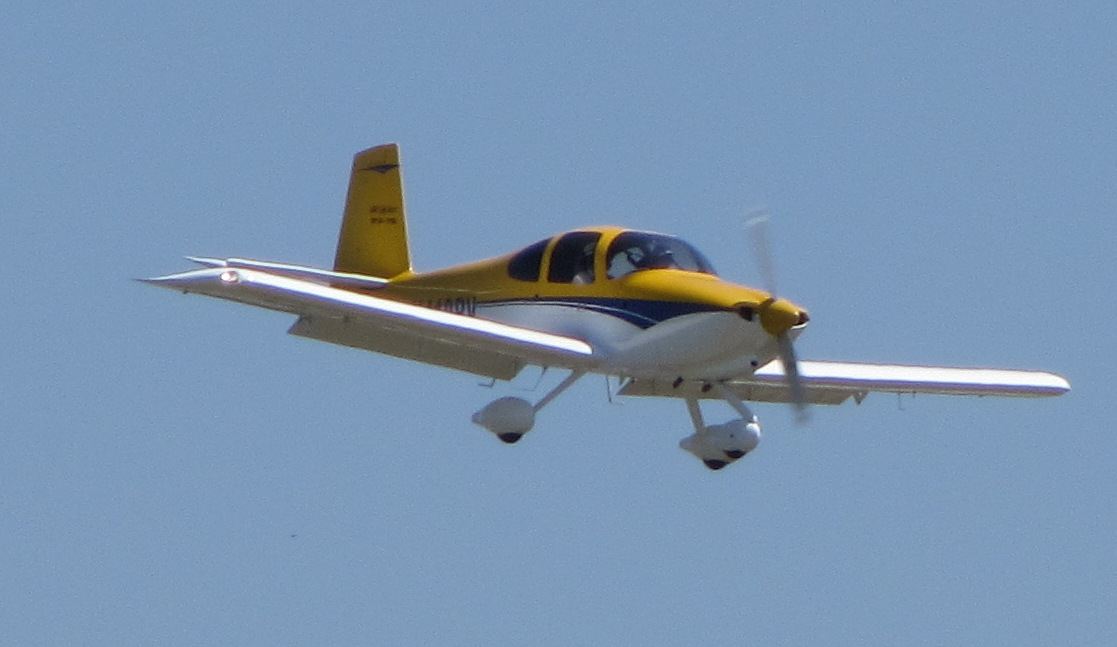

General information
- Type: Homebuilt aircraft
- National origin: United States
- Manufacturer: Van's Aircraft
- Designer: Richard VanGrunsven
- Number built: 1,010 (November 2022)

History
- Introduction date: 2003
- First flight: 29 May 2003
- Developed from: Van's Aircraft RV-7
- Variant: Van's Aircraft RV-14

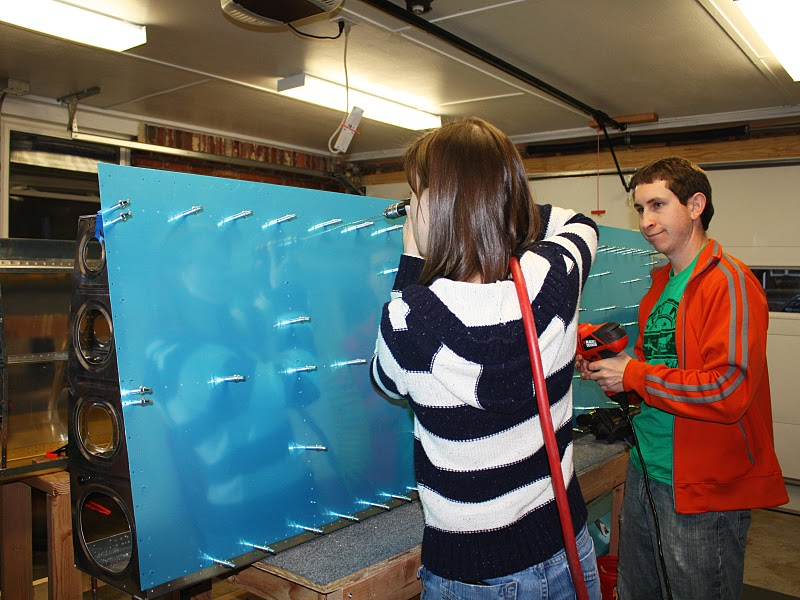
Construction of an RV-10 wing in a garage

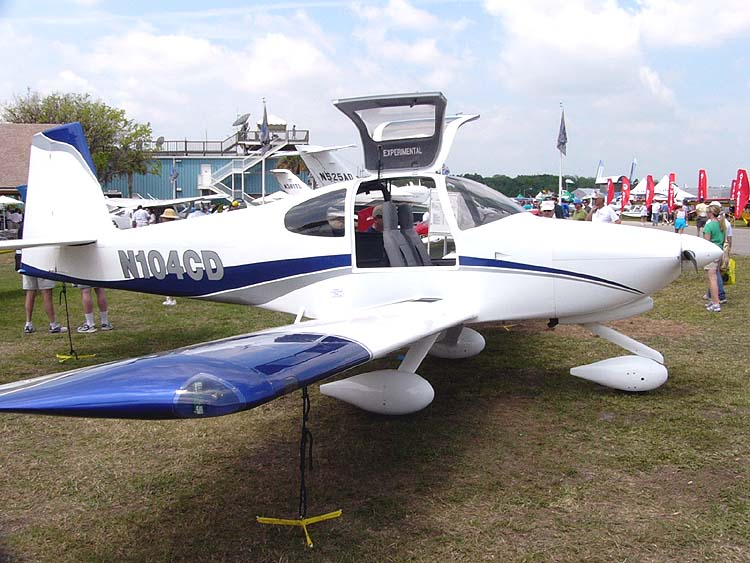
An RV-10 at the Van's Aircraft display at Sun n Fun 2006 in Lakeland Florida

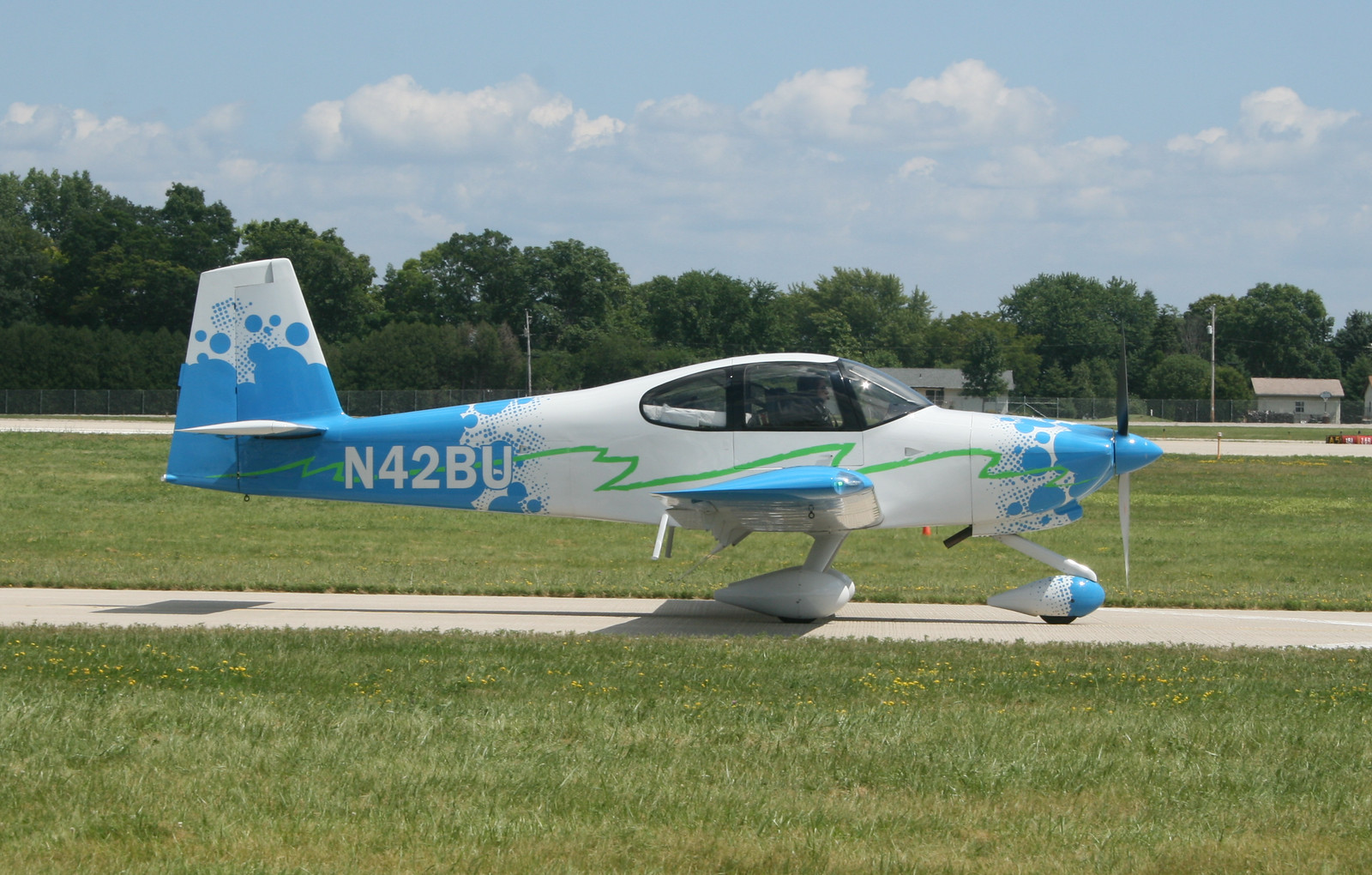
RV10 at EAA Airventure 2014

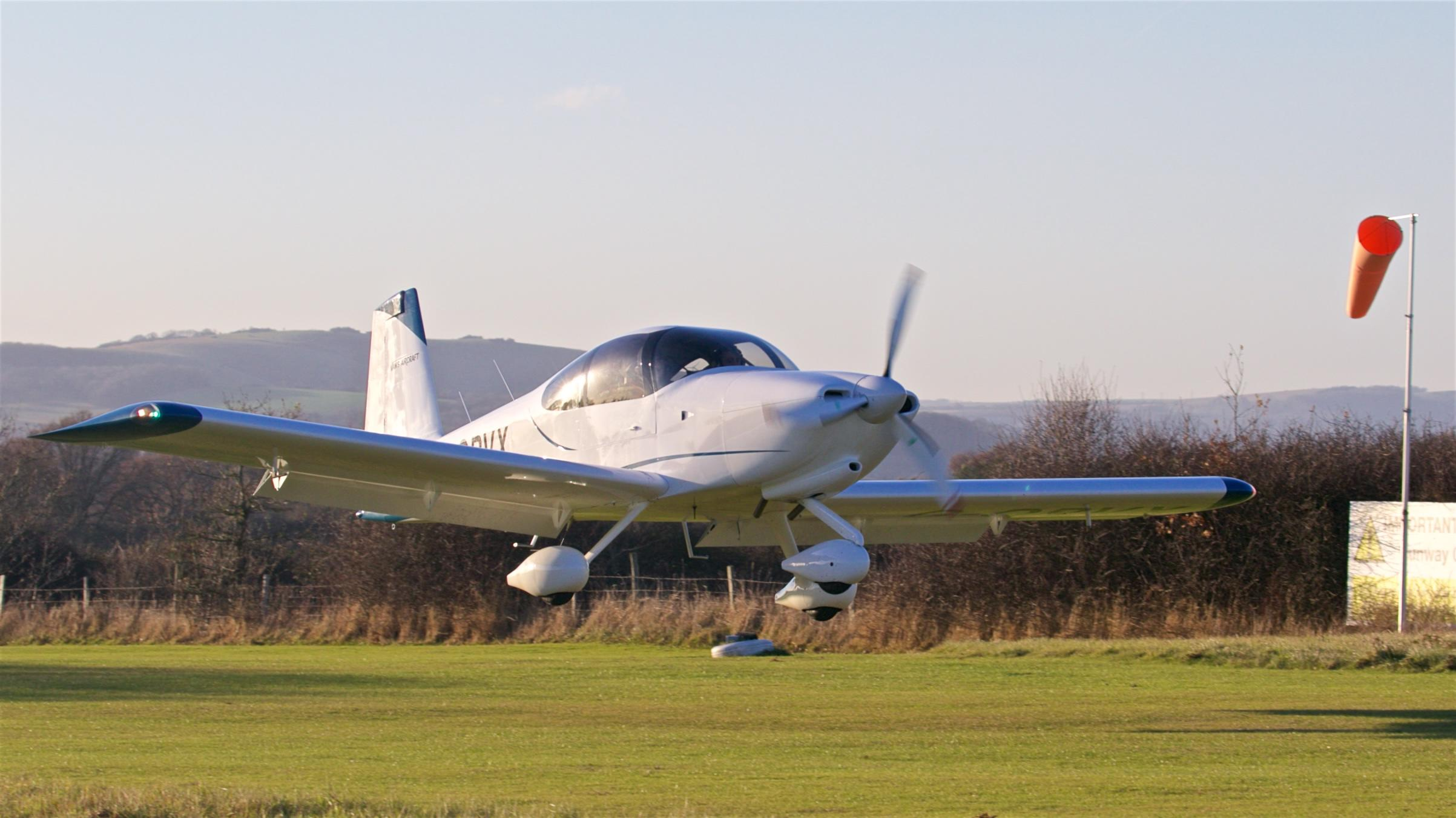
RV-10 landing

The Van's Aircraft RV-10 is a four-seat, single-engine, low-wing homebuilt airplane sold in kit form by Van's Aircraft. It is the first four-seat airplane in the popular RV series. The RV-10 first flew on 29 May 2003, and the first kit parts were delivered to a customer in September 2003.

As of November 2022, 1,010 RV-10s have been completed and flown.

== Design and development ==
The architect of the line of Van's aircraft, Richard VanGrunsven, designed the RV-10 to satisfy a market demand for a four-seat version of the popular RV series aircraft. The RV-10 was designed from the start as a touring aircraft and as such it forgoes the aerobatic capabilities and the lighter handling common to the aircraft in the RV line from the RV-3 to RV-8. Instead the RV-10 design focuses on greater stability and payload.

The design power is 210 to 260 hp (160 to 190 kW) and the prototype was flown with a Lycoming IO-540 powerplant of 260 hp (190 kW), which is the maximum that the airframe was designed to accept. When Van's introduced the RV-10 they planned three engine configurations. One configuration using a smaller lighter 210 hp (160 kW) Continental IO-360ES, and two others using the larger 235 and 260 hp (180 and 190 kW) Lycoming IO-540. The #1 factory demonstrator used the IO-540, while the #2 RV-10 used the Continental IO-360. Vans decided to discontinue the support for the Continental engine after a poll indicated that most builders would install the Lycoming engine, although this poses problems for builders in certain countries with engine displacement limitations, in which the Continental's 360 cu in (5.9 L) displacement would be acceptable.

This is the first aircraft in the RV line that does not have a hinged or sliding canopy. VanGrunsven instead opted for two gull-winged doors to provide access to the four seats.

This design has benefited from many of the production changes that were pioneered with the RV-7, RV-8 and the RV-9. Like those aircraft, the RV-10 uses computer assisted design to produce a kit with pre-drilled rivet holes, thus greatly reducing assembly time for the builder. The RV-10 is available only as a tricycle landing gear version and no tailwheel or retractable landing gear versions are planned.

The aircraft is constructed of aluminum with the cabin structure and gull-winged doors made from composite materials. The landing gear is tubular steel with the nosewheel mounting tube welded to the engine mount. As in all nose-wheel equipped RV aircraft, the nosewheel is free castering and the aircraft is steered with differential braking. The brakes are mounted conventionally on the rudder pedal toes.

The amount of time and effort required to build the airplane can vary greatly, but Vans claims that the average first-time builder can complete it in 2,000 hours.

In February 2019 BRS Aerospace released a kit to install a ballistic parachute on the RV-10. The kit can be installed on a completed RV-10 or one under construction. The parachute takes up one third of the aircraft's baggage bay and weighs 82 lb (37 kg).

== Variants ==
Aircraft Turbine Solution Group PBS TP-100 RV-10
The RV-10 was selected as the testbed aircraft for the Diemech TP 100 241 hp (180 kW) turboprop engine, which first flew on 8 June 2014. The testbed aircraft was outfitted with 120 gallon fuel tanks and was to be tested at altitudes of up to 20,000 ft (6,096 m).

== Specifications (RV-10) ==
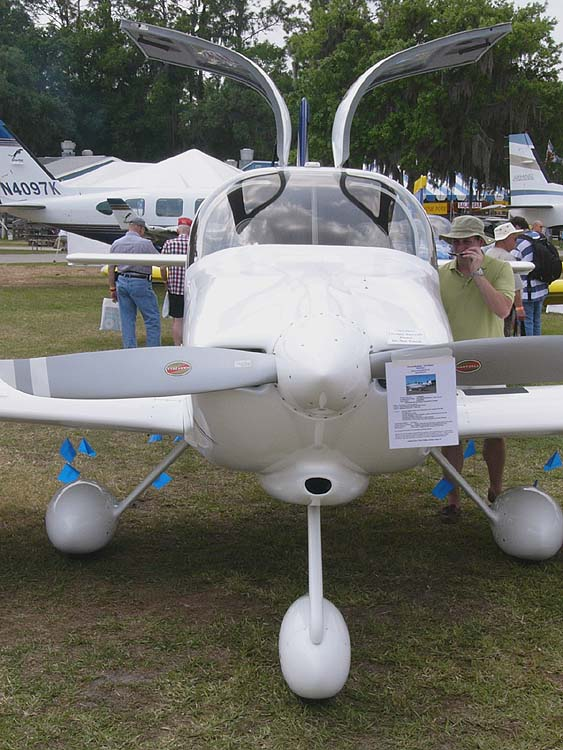
The RV-10 from the front, showing the gull-winged doors for cabin entry

Data from Manufacturer

General characteristics

- Crew: one
- Capacity: four passengers
- Length: 24 ft 5 in (7.44 m)
- Wingspan: 31 ft 9 in (9.68 m)
- Height: 8 ft 8 in (2.64 m)
- Wing area: 148 sq ft (13.7 m^{2})
- Empty weight: 1,630 lb (739 kg)
- Gross weight: 2,700 lb (1,225 kg)
- Fuel capacity: 60 U.S. gallons (230 L; 50 imp gal)
- Powerplant: 1 × Lycoming O-540 six-cylinder, air-cooled aircraft engine, 260 hp (190 kW)
- Propellers: 2-bladed constant speed Hartzell Propeller

Performance

- Maximum speed: 208 mph (335 km/h, 181 kn)
- Cruise speed: 197 mph (317 km/h, 171 kn) 75% power at 8,000 ft (2,438 m)
- Stall speed: 63 mph (101 km/h, 55 kn)
- Range: 825 mi (1,328 km, 717 nmi) 75% power at 8,000 ft (2,438 m)
- Service ceiling: 20,000 ft (6,100 m)
- Rate of climb: 1,450 ft/min (7.4 m/s)
- Wing loading: 18.6 lb/sq ft (91 kg/m^{2})

== See also ==
Related development

- Van's Aircraft RV-6
- Van's Aircraft RV-7

Aircraft of comparable role, configuration, and era

- Cessna 400
- Cirrus SR22
- Cirrus SR20
- Sling Aircraft Sling TSi
