= Van's Aircraft RV-14 =

American homebuilt airplane

RV-14
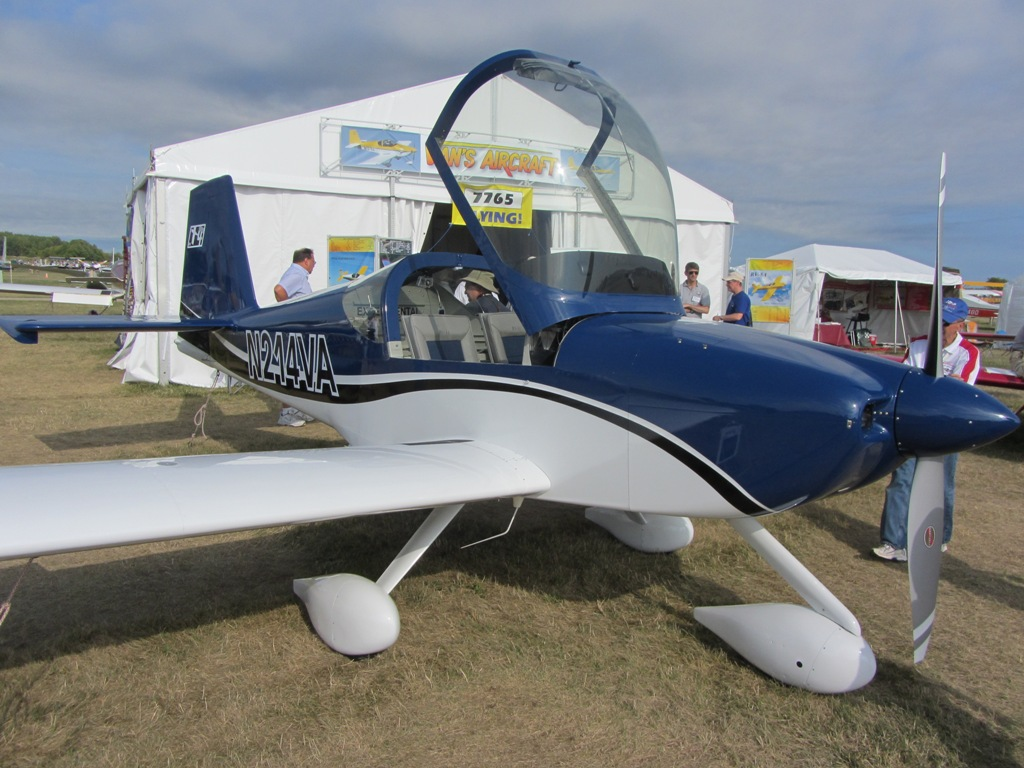
- RV-14A Prototype

General information
- Type: Kit aircraft
- National origin: United States
- Manufacturer: Van's Aircraft
- Designer: Richard VanGrunsven
- Status: Kits in production
- Number built: 207 (November 2022)

History
- Introduction date: July 2012
- Developed from: Van's Aircraft RV-10

The Van's Aircraft RV-14 is an American aerobatic kit aircraft designed by Richard VanGrunsven and produced by Van's Aircraft. It was introduced at AirVenture in July 2012. The aircraft is supplied as a kit for amateur construction.

As of November 2022, 207 RV-14s have been completed and flown.

== Design and development ==
Derived from the four-seat RV-10, RV-14 design work was commenced several years before its 2012 debut. It is an aerobatic two-seater designed to accommodate large pilots and offer greater baggage space, to comply with the US experimental amateur-built aircraft rules. The design goals included improved visibility, a wider cabin, a low landing speed achieved by larger and more effective flaps, good rate-of-climb and glide ratio, landing gear that meets FAR Part 23 certification standards and an airframe designed to accommodate the Lycoming IO-390 powerplant. It features a cantilever low-wing, a two-seats-in-side-by-side configuration enclosed cockpit under a bubble canopy, fixed tricycle landing gear and a single engine in tractor configuration.

The RV-14 is built from aluminum sheet. The prototype was fitted with a 210 hp (157 kW) Lycoming IO-390 four-stroke powerplant. The kit is intended to be easier to assemble than earlier Van's designs through the use of pre-punched and pre-formed fuselage longerons, pre-installed wiring, plug-in avionics, a pre-trimmed and ready-to-install bubble canopy, pre-welded canopy frame, pre-fitted engine baffles as well as matched pre-punched holes. The RV-14 offers several instrument panel choices, including one designed to take modern electronic flight instrument systems (EFIS), like the Dynon SkyView, without any additional cutting, as well as a blank panel that can be customized by the builder.

In July 2020 Van's introduced a new version of the Lycoming IO-390, designated as the IO-390-EXP119 and optimized for the RV-14. The engine has new exhaust and induction systems and puts out 215 hp (160 kW). It has a revised oil sump, aluminum induction pipes, oil pump and accessory case that saves 10 lb (5 kg) of weight. With this powerplant the RV-14 is 11 mph (18 km/h) faster in cruise speed and climbs 250 ft/min (1.27 m/s) faster.

The manufacturer offers aircraft type transition training and has built an RV-14 for this purpose.

== Variants ==
RV-14
Two-seat conventional landing gear variant with tailwheel.
RV-14A
Two-seat tricycle landing gear variant.

== Specifications (RV-14A) ==
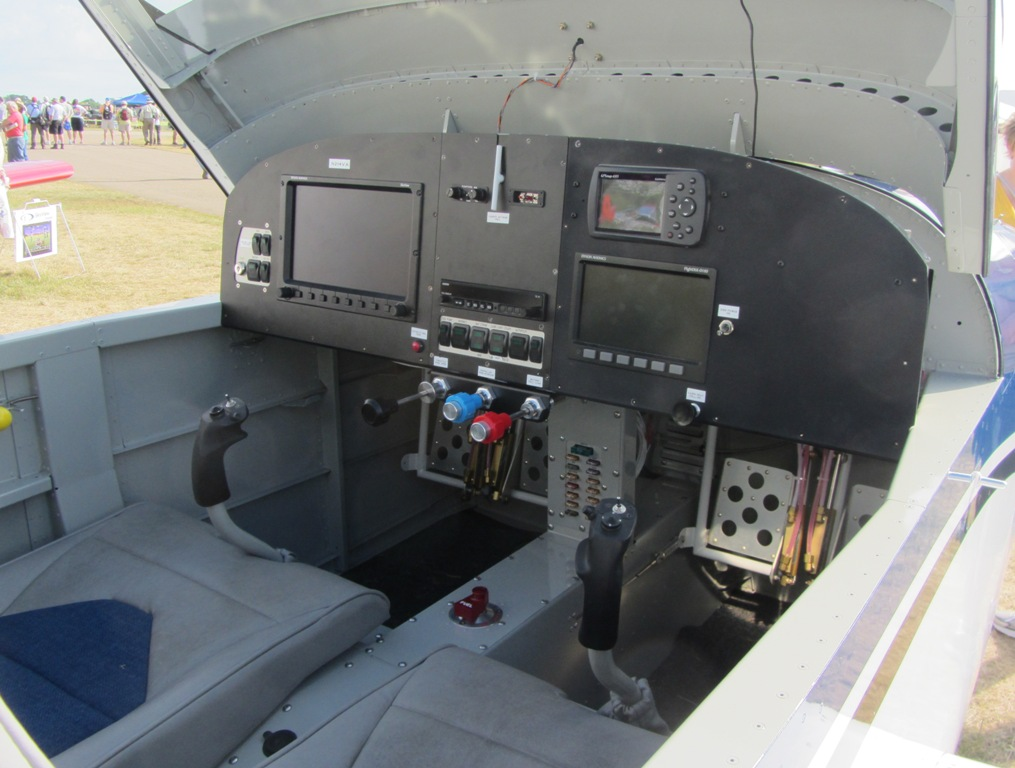
RV-14 Instrument Panel

Data from AVweb, KitPlanes and manufacturer

General characteristics

- Crew: one
- Capacity: one passenger
- Length: 21 ft 1 in (6.43 m)
- Wingspan: 27 ft 0 in (8.23 m)
- Height: 8 ft 2 in (2.49 m)
- Wing area: 126.1 sq ft (11.72 m^{2})
- Empty weight: 1,240 lb (562 kg)
- Gross weight: 2,050 lb (930 kg)
- Fuel capacity: 50 U.S. gallons (190 L; 42 imp gal)
- Powerplant: 1 × Lycoming IO-390 four cylinder, air-cooled, four stroke aircraft engine, 210 hp (160 kW)
- Propellers: 2-bladed Hartzel C2YR-1BFP/F7497-2 or C2YR-1BFP/F7497

Performance

- Maximum speed: 207 mph (333 km/h, 180 kn)
- Cruise speed: 190 mph (310 km/h, 170 kn)
- Stall speed: 54 mph (87 km/h, 47 kn)
- Range: 938 mi (1,510 km, 815 nmi)
- Service ceiling: 18,000 ft (5,500 m)
- g limits: +6/-3g at the aerobatic gross weight of 1,900 lb (862 kg)
- Wing loading: 16.26 lb/sq ft (79.4 kg/m^{2})
