= Van's Aircraft =

Kit aircraft manufacturer

Van's Aircraft, Inc.
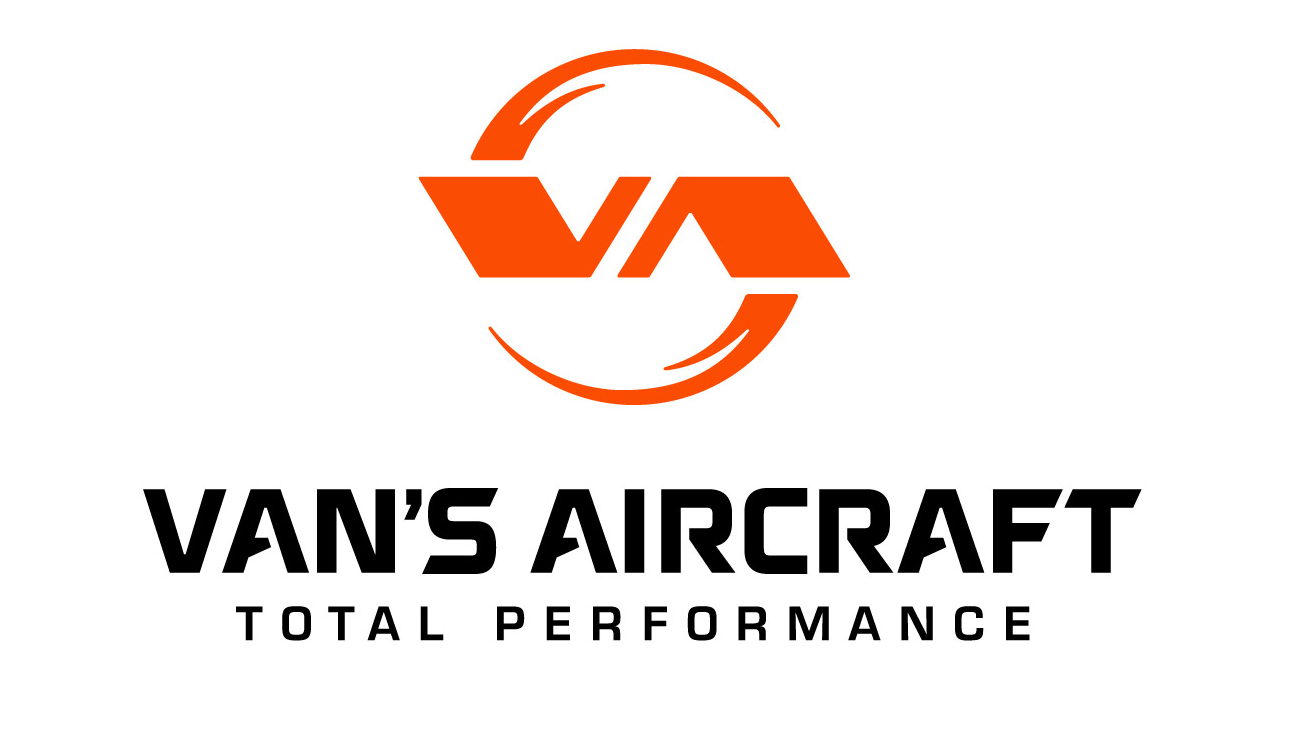
- Industry: Aerospace
- Founded: 1973
- Founder: Richard VanGrunsven
- Headquarters: Aurora State Airport, Oregon 045°14′32″N 122°45′57″W, Aurora, Oregon, United States
- Products: Kit aircraft
- Revenue: $52.6 million (2022)
- Net income: -$3.3 million (2022)
- Number of employees: 110 (2023)
- Website: www.vansaircraft.com

Van's Aircraft, Inc. is an American kit aircraft manufacturer founded by Richard VanGrunsven in 1973. The Van's RV series aircraft are all-aluminum, mostly low-wing monoplanes of monocoque construction. In 2023, over 11,000 Van's aircraft were flying worldwide, making up one third of the USA's experimental aircraft fleet.

The Van's Aircraft factory is located at Aurora State Airport, Oregon. The company filed for Chapter 11 bankruptcy protection in December 2023.

== History ==
The company was founded by Richard "Dick" VanGrunsven in 1973.

In 2013, the company announced it would begin selling assembled RV-12 model aircraft as well on a limited basis.

In December 2017, the company reported that its 10,000th aircraft had flown, an RV-7 built in Martinsburg, West Virginia.

As of November 2019, about 10,600 RV kits had been completed and flown, and thousands more are under construction. Completion rates currently average about 1.5 per day, making the series the most numerous of all homebuilt aircraft.

After announcing financial difficulties in October 2023, on December 4 2023 Van's filed for Chapter 11 bankruptcy protection. Factors leading to the reorganization included corrosion issues (a "multi million" dollar problem), laser-cutting instead of punched parts (affecting 1800 kits), and kit pricing under the cost of production and shipping.

== Regulatory status ==
Previous company logo, used 1973-2018

RVs are deemed Experimental Amateur Built (EAB) aircraft by the Federal Aviation Administration in the United States and are accepted under the corresponding category by the aviation authorities in many other countries, including the United Kingdom, Canada, New Zealand and Australia. A modified version of the RV-6 was sold to the Nigerian government as a kit-assembled military trainer.

The RV-12iS is available as an experimental light sport aircraft (ELSA) or special light-sport aircraft (SLSA), which allows for commercial use for purposes like rental and flight training.

== RV aircraft series ==
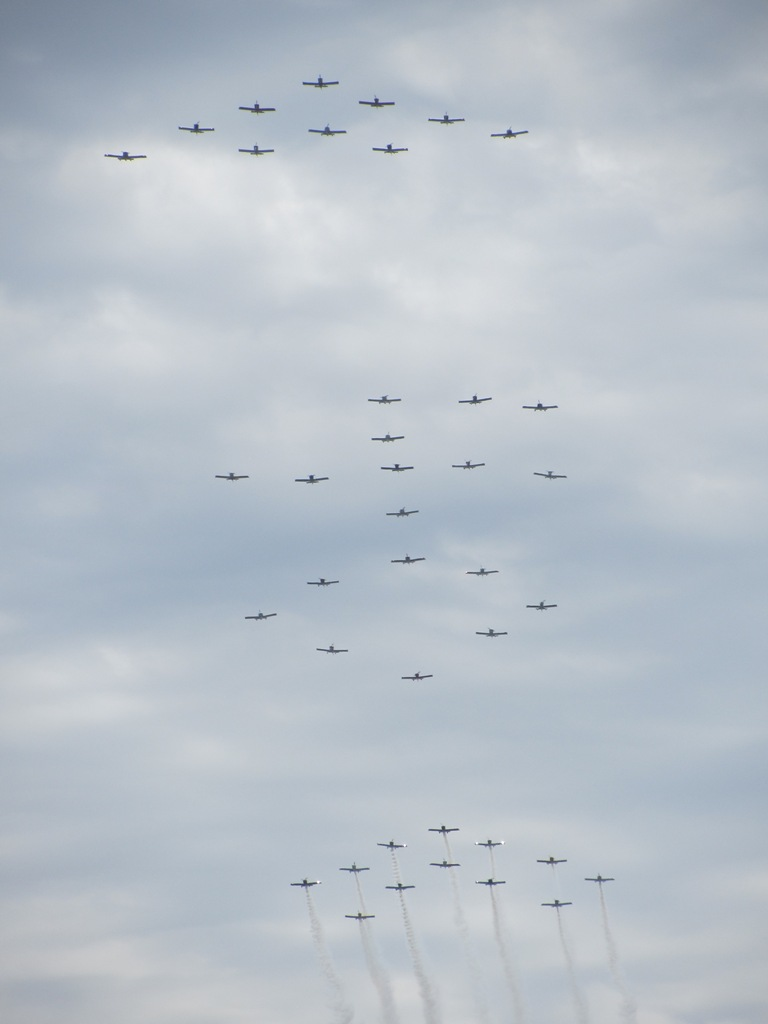
Formation flight of 40 Van's Aircraft

- RV-3: single-seat kit aircraft, aerobatic, debuted in 1972; genesis design for rest of the RV series
- RV-4: two-seat kit aircraft, tandem seating, aerobatic, bubble canopy
- RV-6: two-seat, side-by-side seating aircraft, aerobatic; the most-built model of the RV series and likely the most popular kitplane ever produced
- RV-7: modernized kit with similarity to the RV-6, with longer wingspan and larger rudder, aerobatic; replaced the RV-6 model
- RV-8: two-seat tandem seating, aerobatic aircraft, with larger cockpit and greater overall size than the RV-4
- RV-9: two seat, side-by-side aircraft; non-aerobatic, with larger wing and more docile handling qualities than others in the RV line
- RV-10: largest of the RV fleet with four seats, non-aerobatic, tricycle landing gear only
- RV-12: two-seat, side-by-side light-sport aircraft, updated to RV-12iS variant in 2017
- RV-14: two-seat, side-by-side aerobatic aircraft, considered similar to the RV-7 in design but larger and roomier
- RV-15: high-wing, back-country capable aircraft

Four of the designations missing from this sequence — RV-1, RV-2, RV-5, and RV-11 — apply to projects by Richard VanGrunsven that were never produced or marketed by Van's Aircraft (or even completed in the case of the RV-2 and RV-11). The RV-13 designation was not used at all.

== Gallery ==
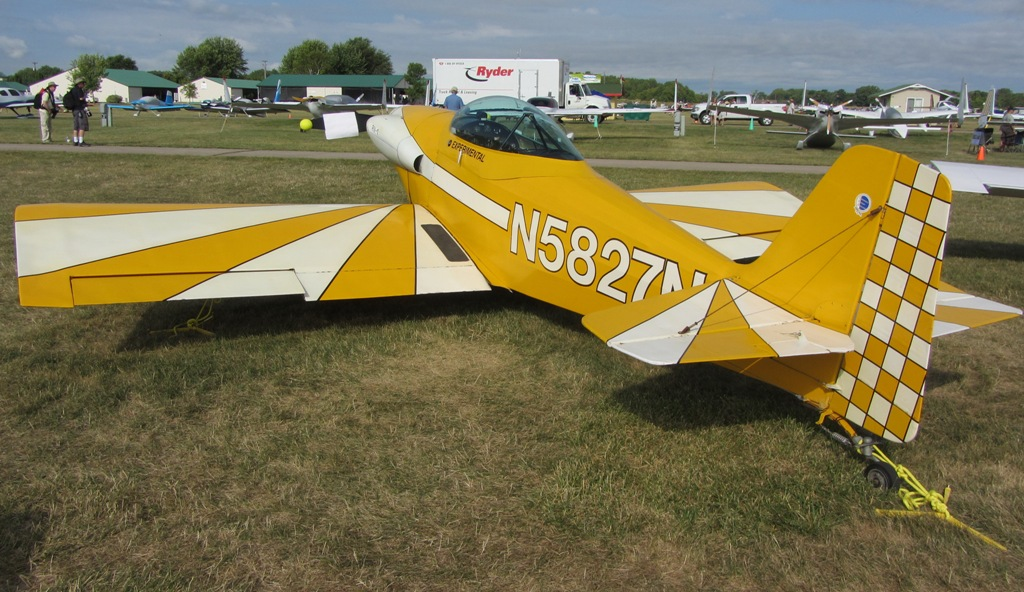
RV-1

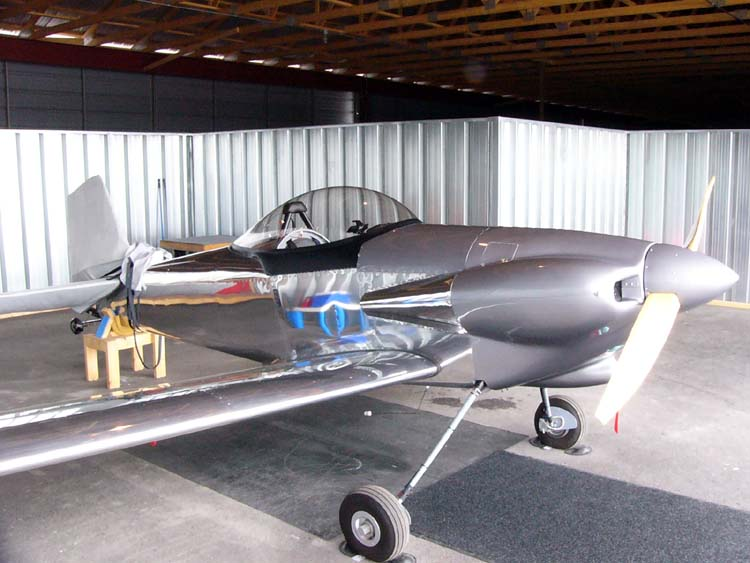
RV-3

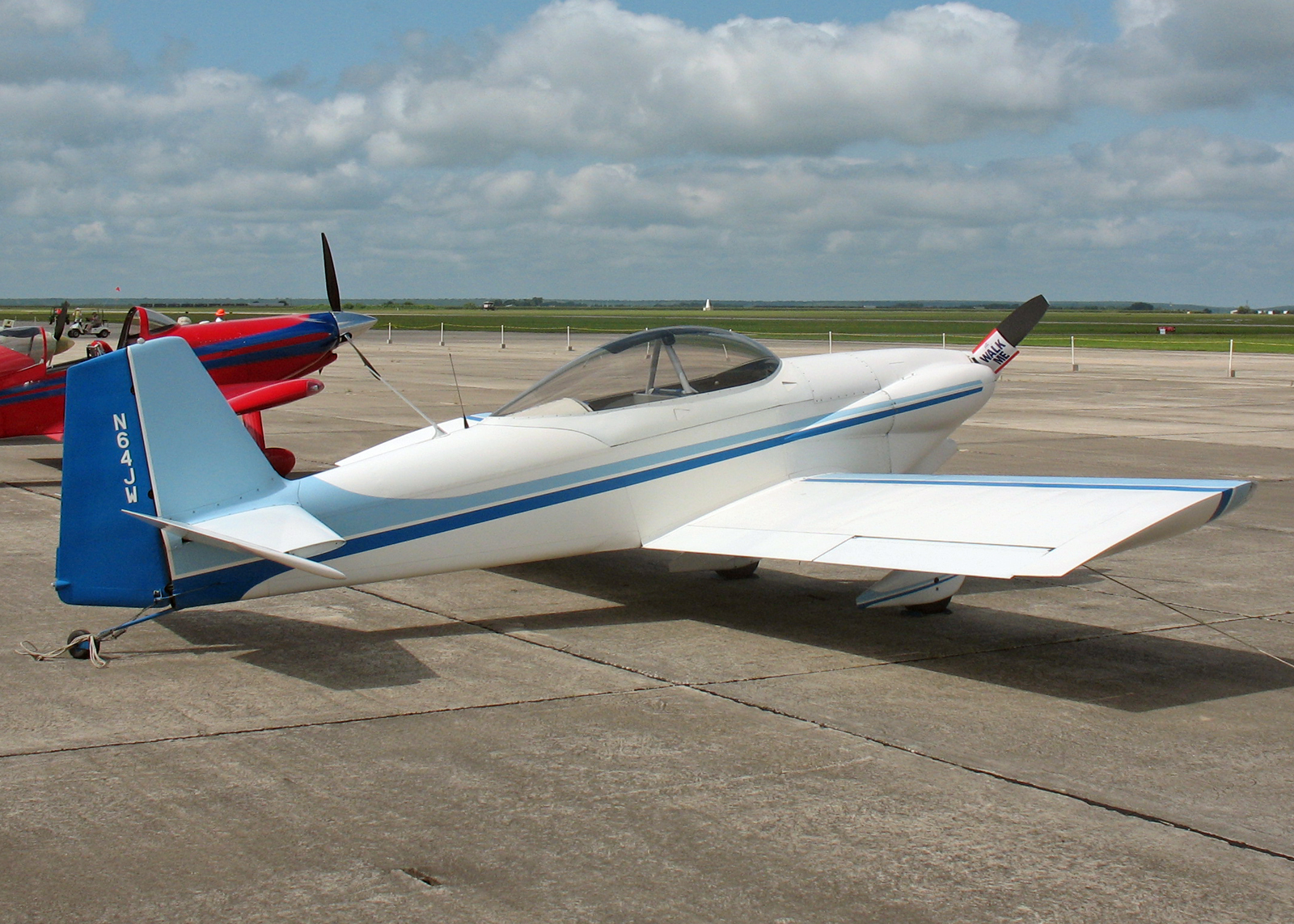
RV-4

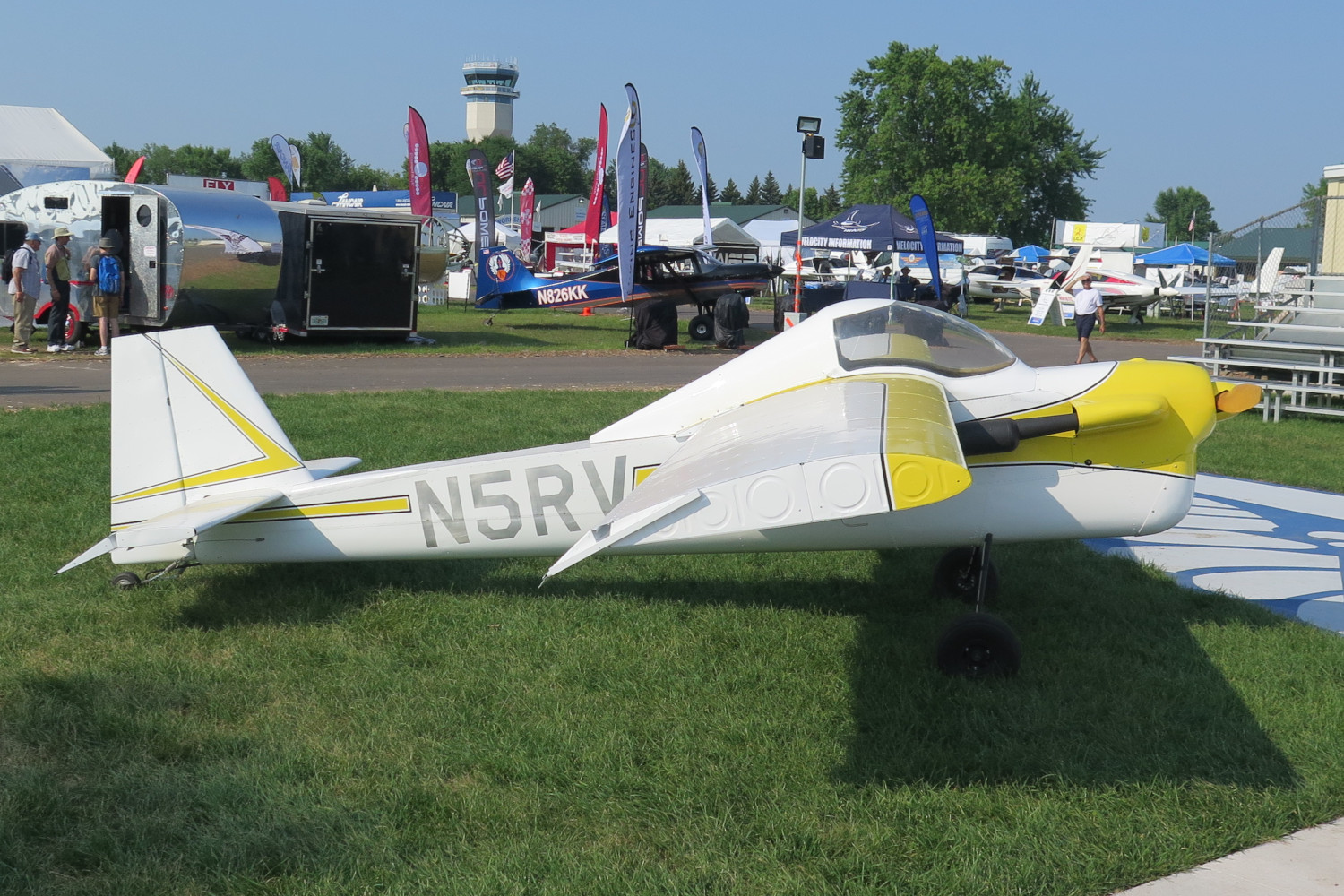
RV-5

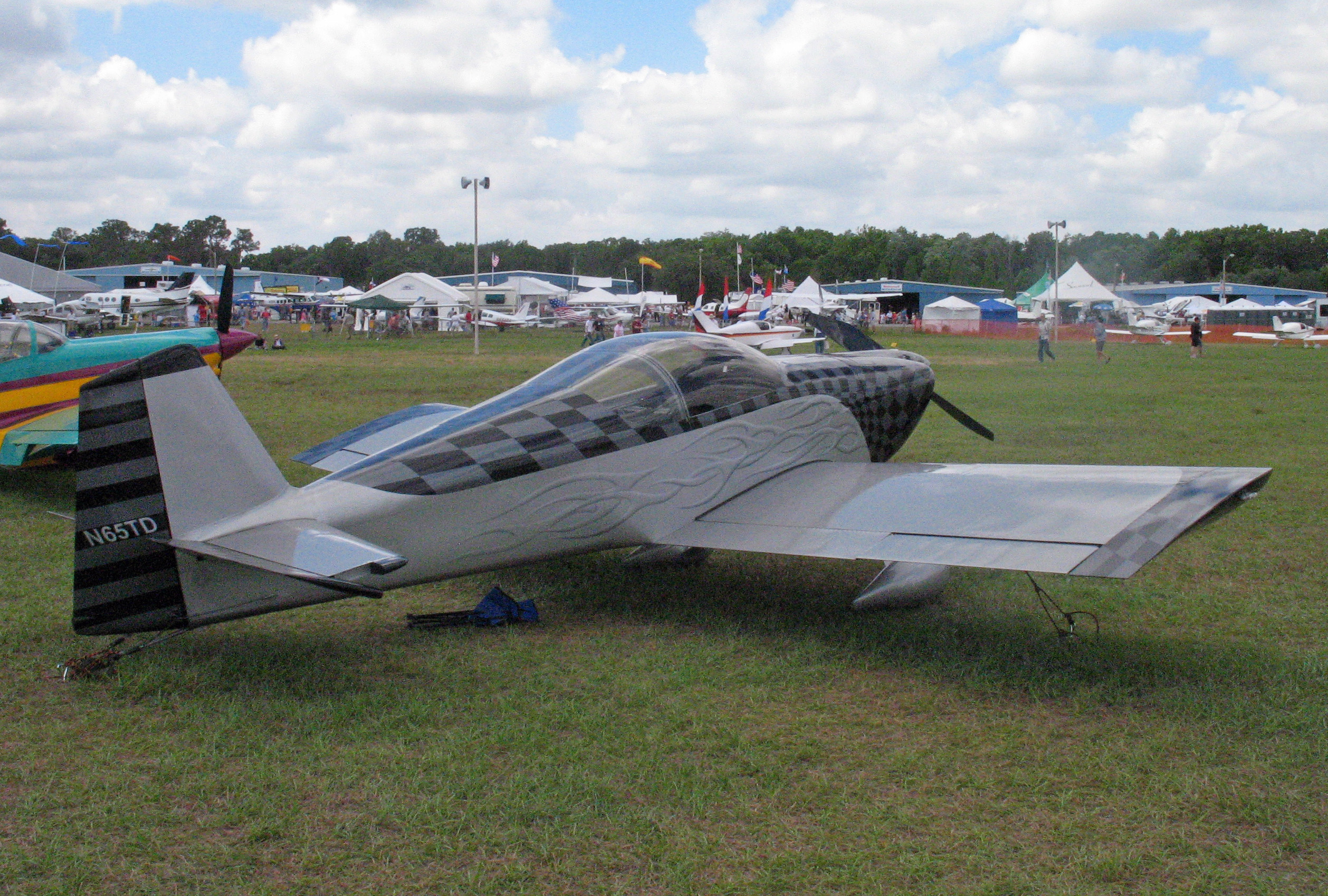
RV-6

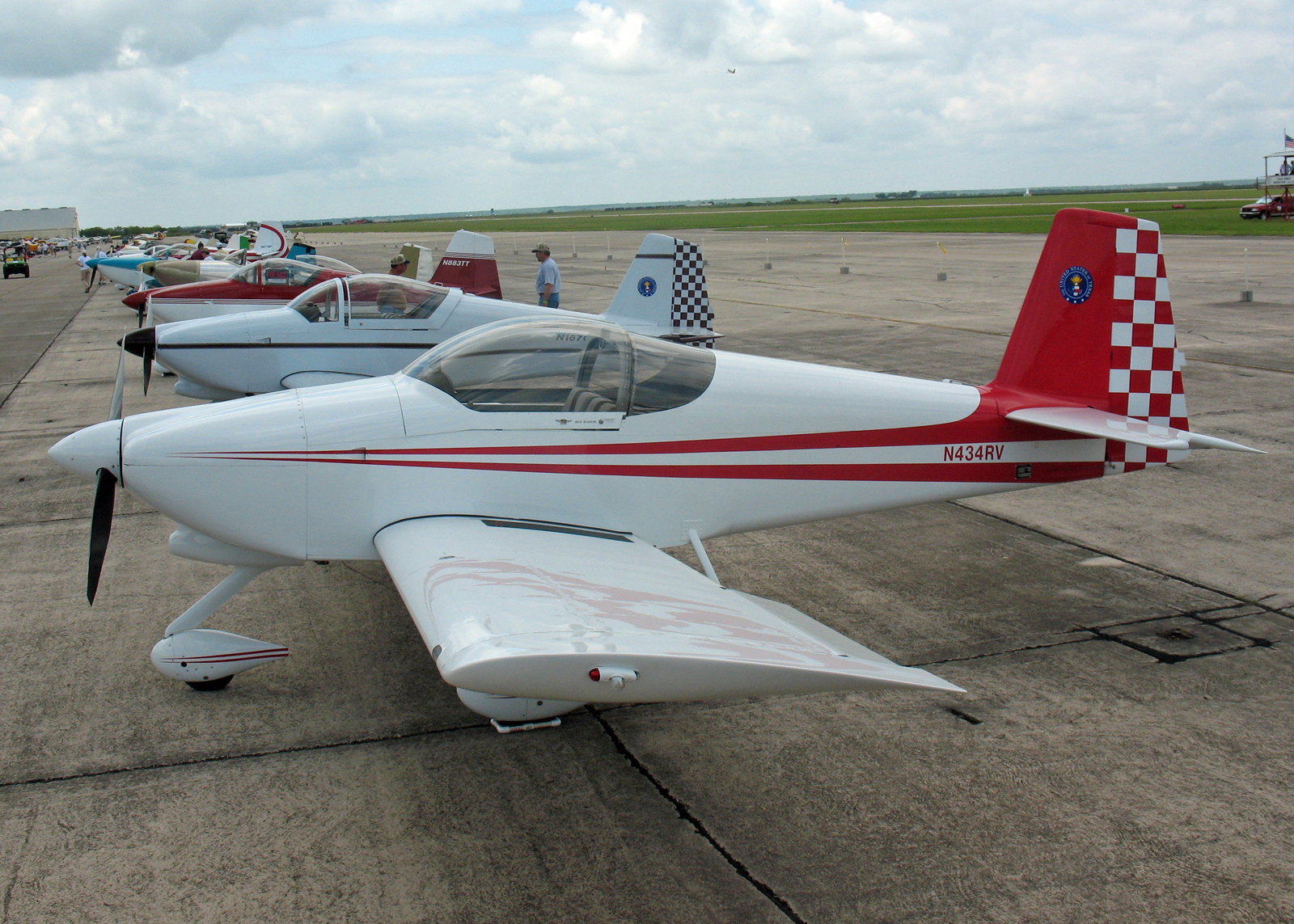
RV-6A

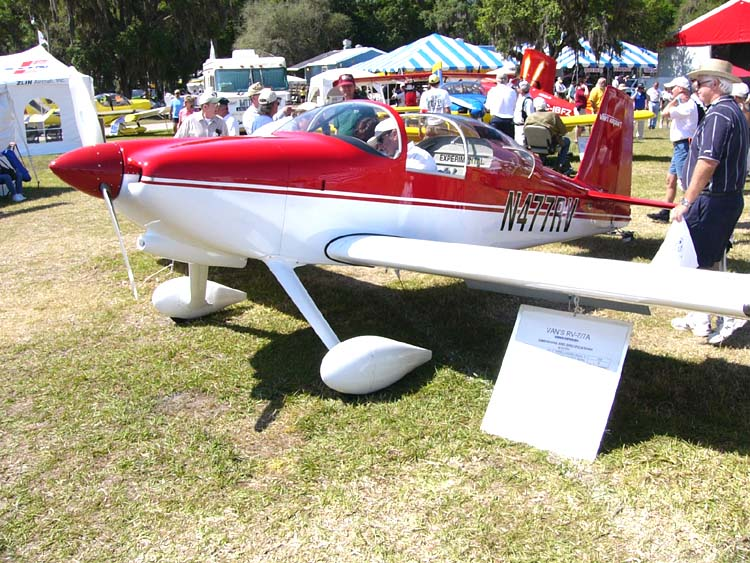
RV-7

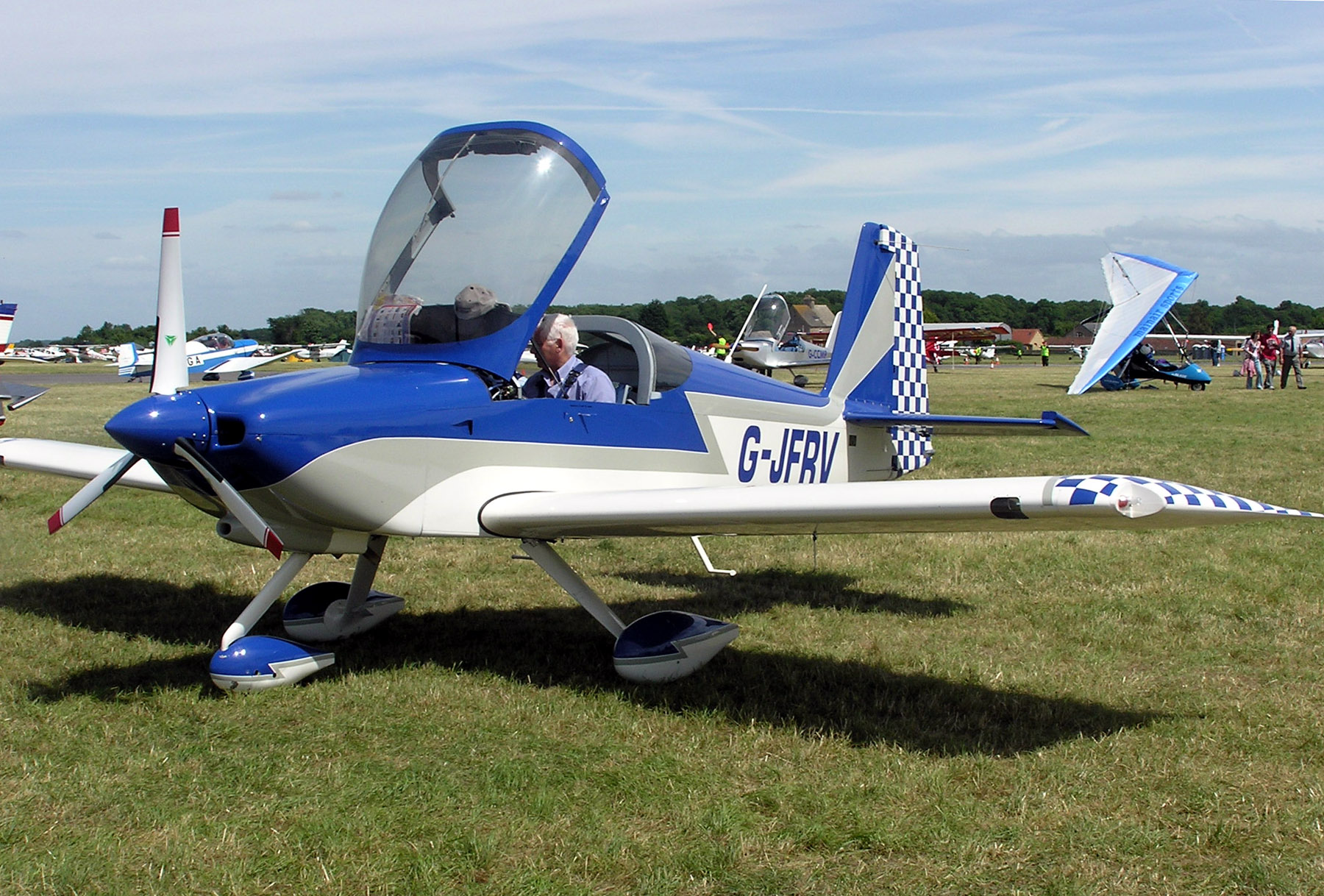
RV-7A

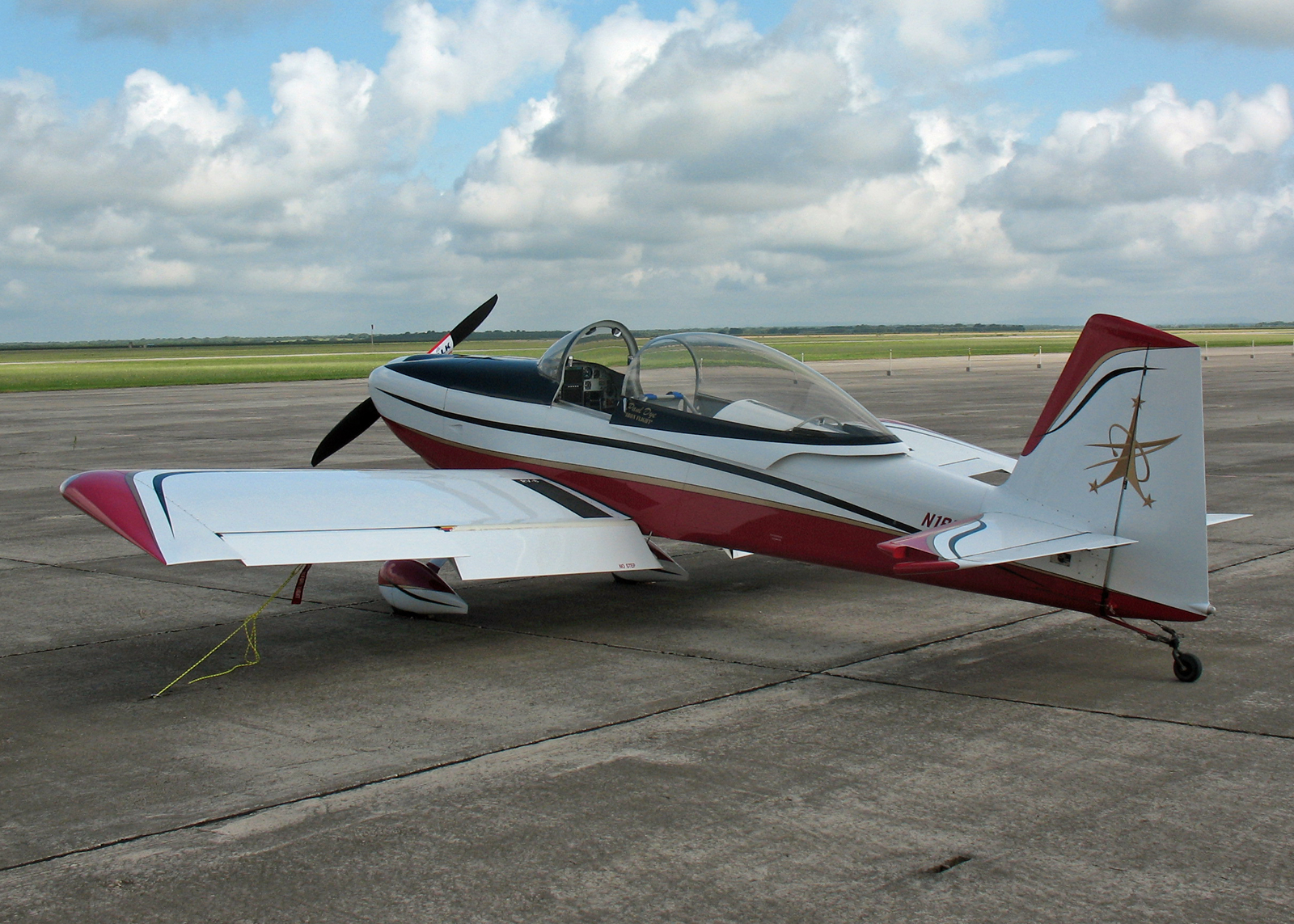
RV-8

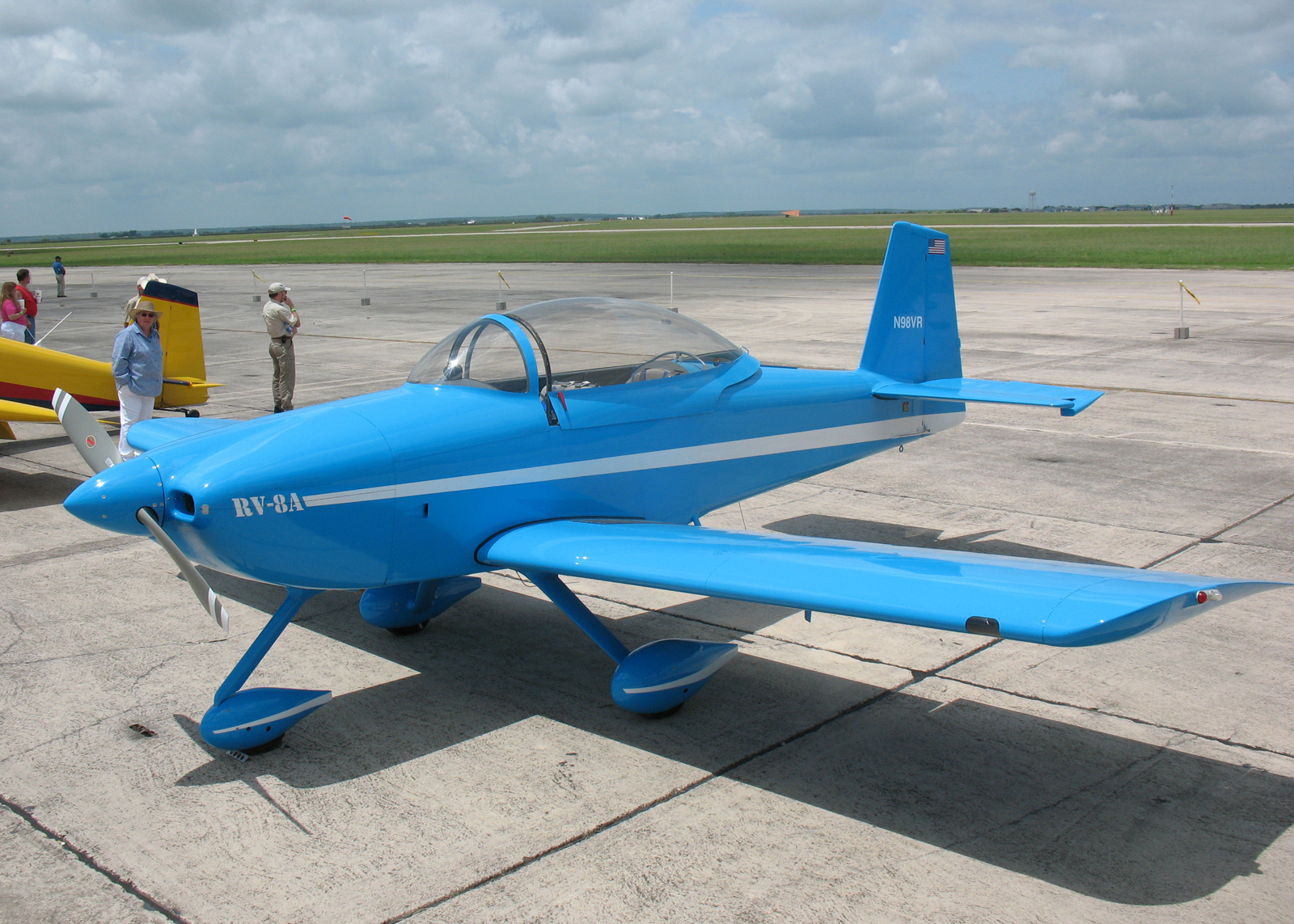
RV-8A

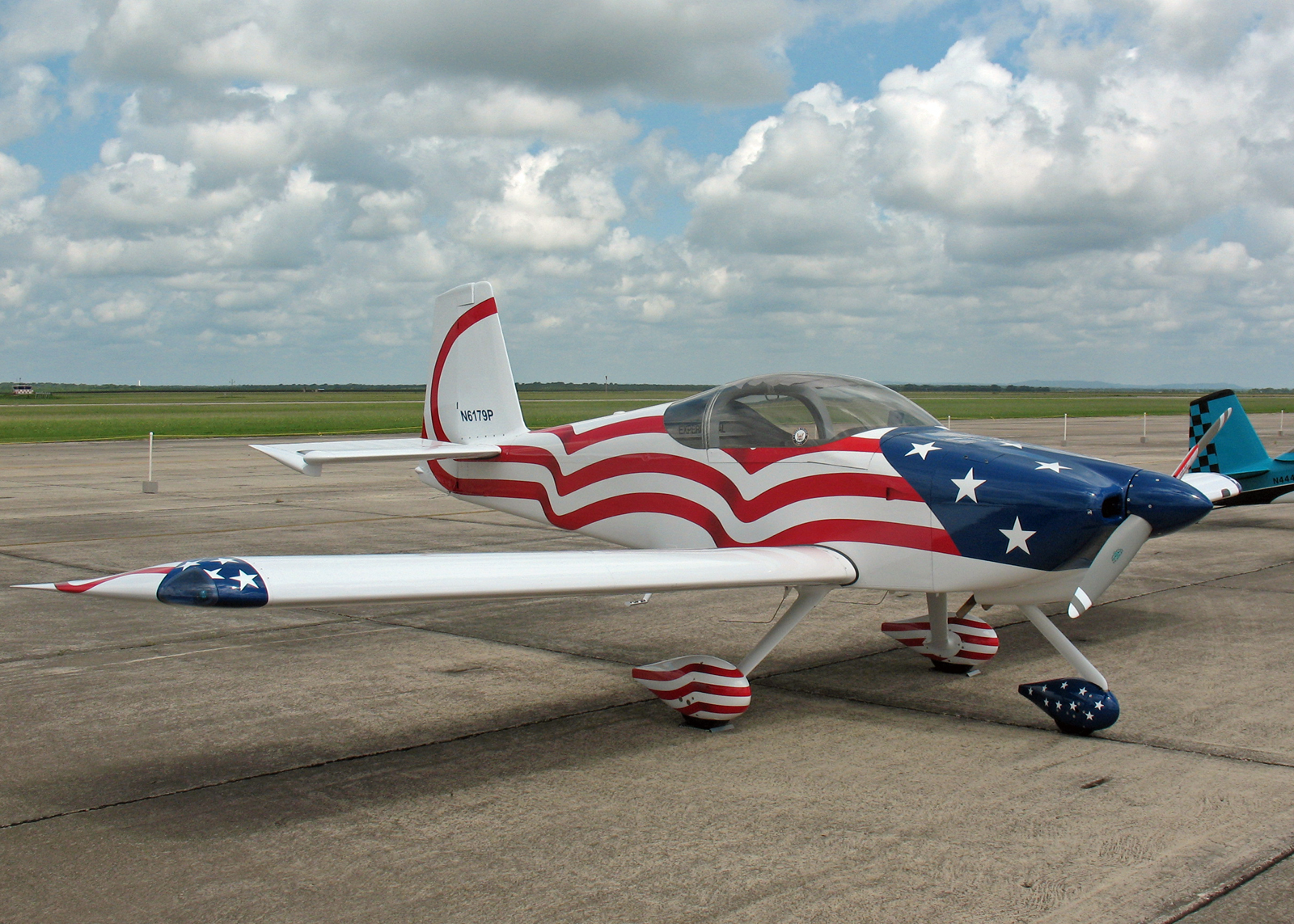
RV-9A

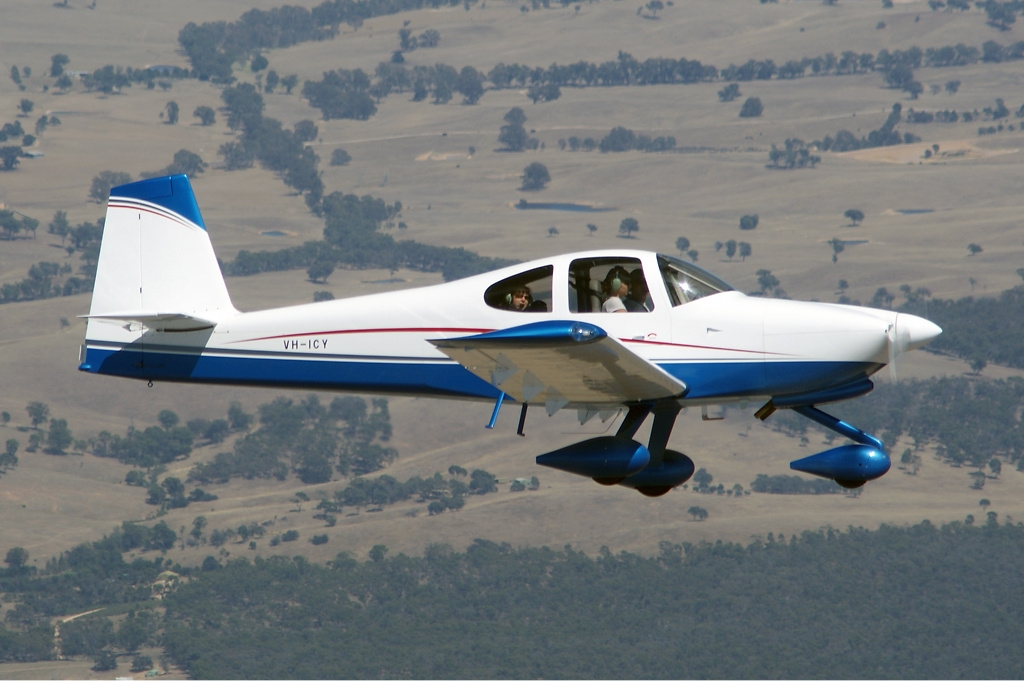
RV-10

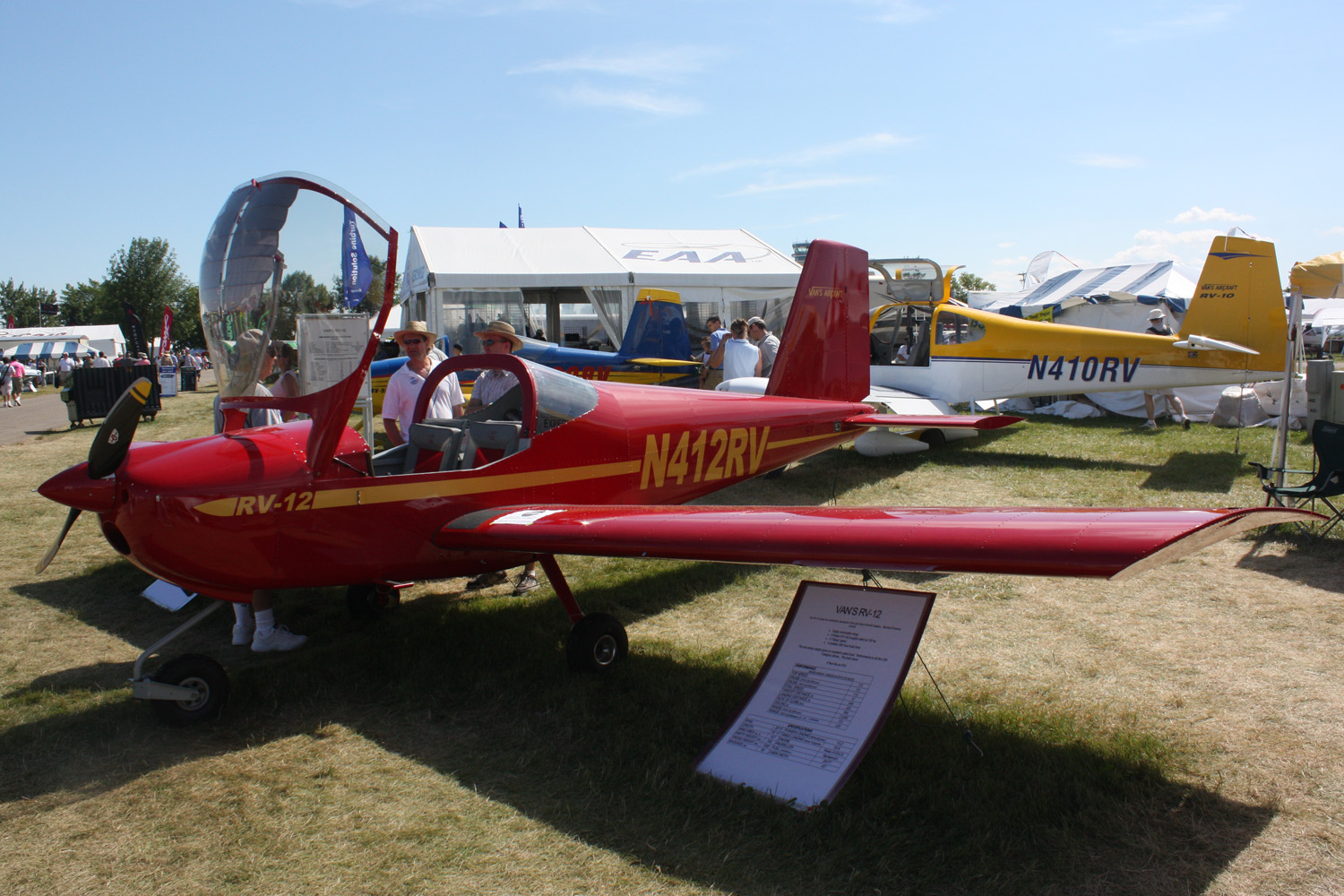
RV-12

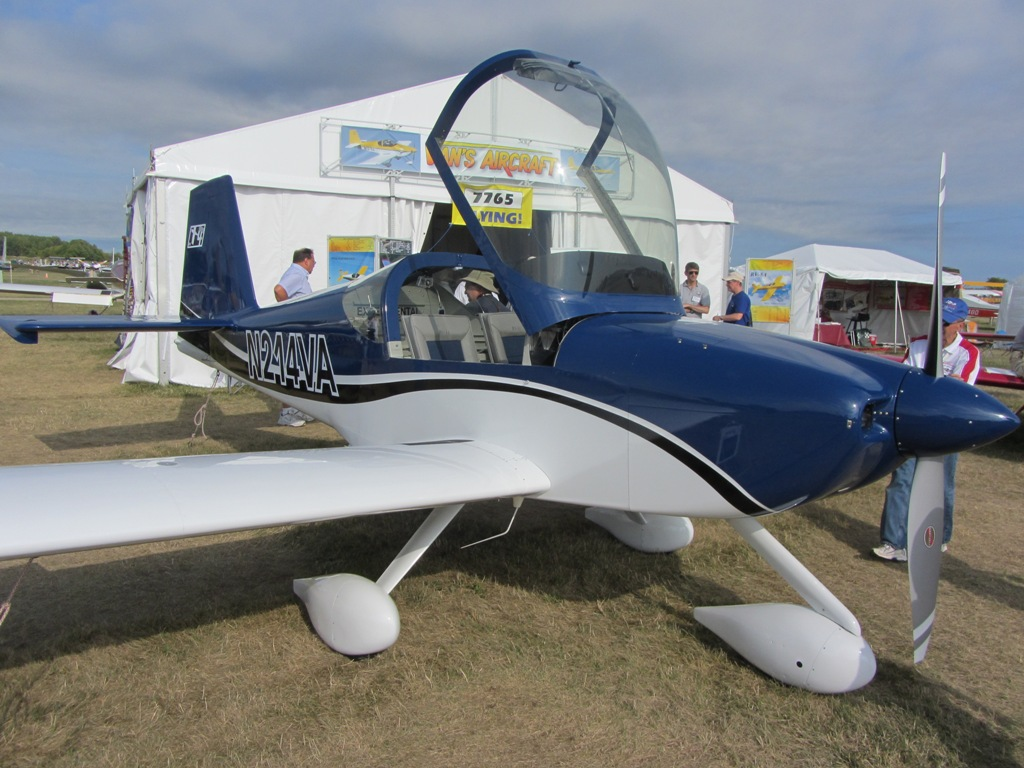
RV-14A

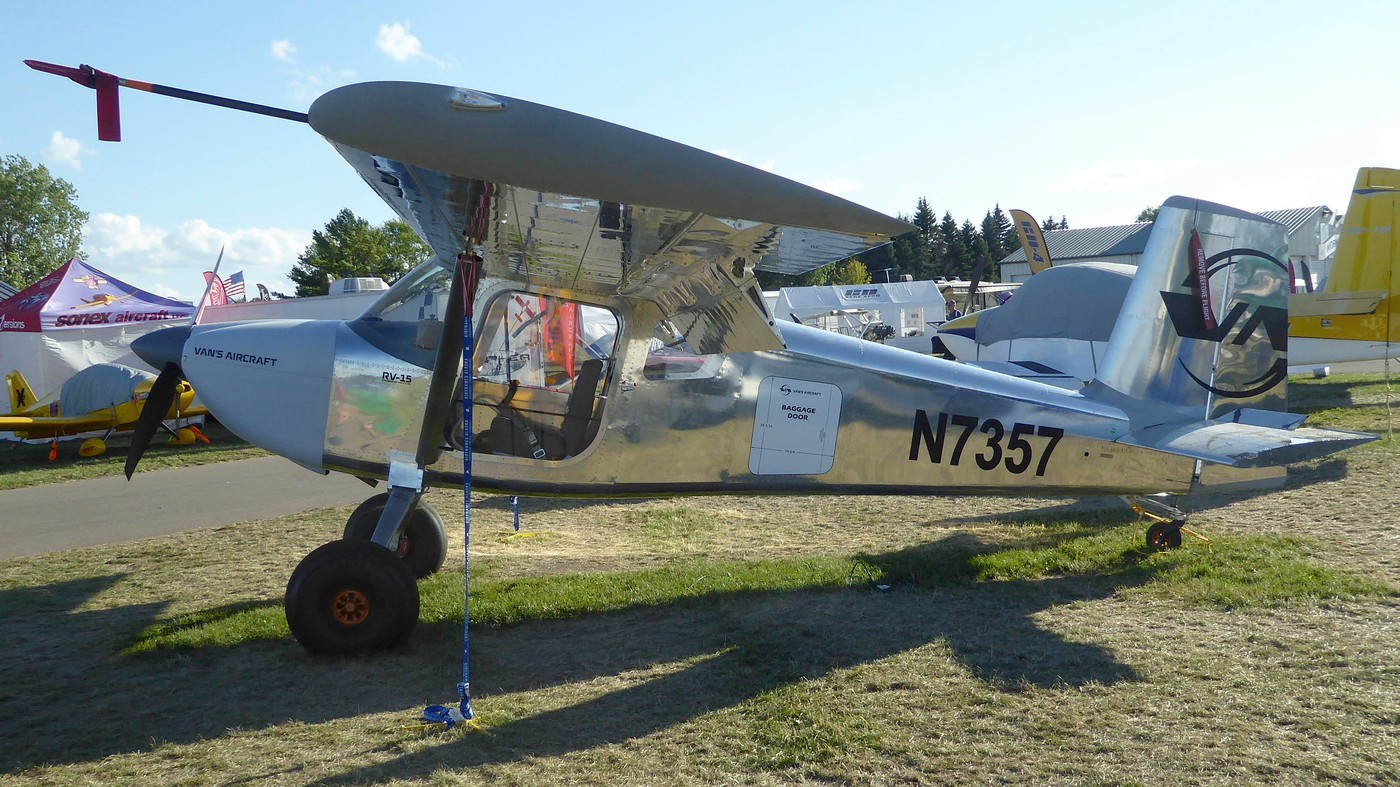
RV-15
