= Richard VanGrunsven =

American aerospace engineer

- Born: 1939 (age 86–87); Forest Grove, Oregon, US
- Education: University of Portland
- Occupations: Engineer, aviation entrepreneur
- Years active: 1961–present
- Known for: Van's Aircraft founder
- Spouse: Diane VanGrunsven

Richard E. "Dick" VanGrunsven (Note: Although commonly known as "Dick" by the media and public, VanGrunsven primarily uses "Richard".) (born 1939) is an American aircraft designer and kit plane manufacturer. The number of VanGrunsven-designed homebuilt aircraft produced each year in North America exceeds the production of all commercial general aviation companies combined.

In 1973 VanGrunsven founded the aircraft manufacturing company Van's Aircraft, and in 2012 became the founding president of the Aircraft Kit Industry Association (AKIA), an American aviation advocacy association.

== Life and career ==
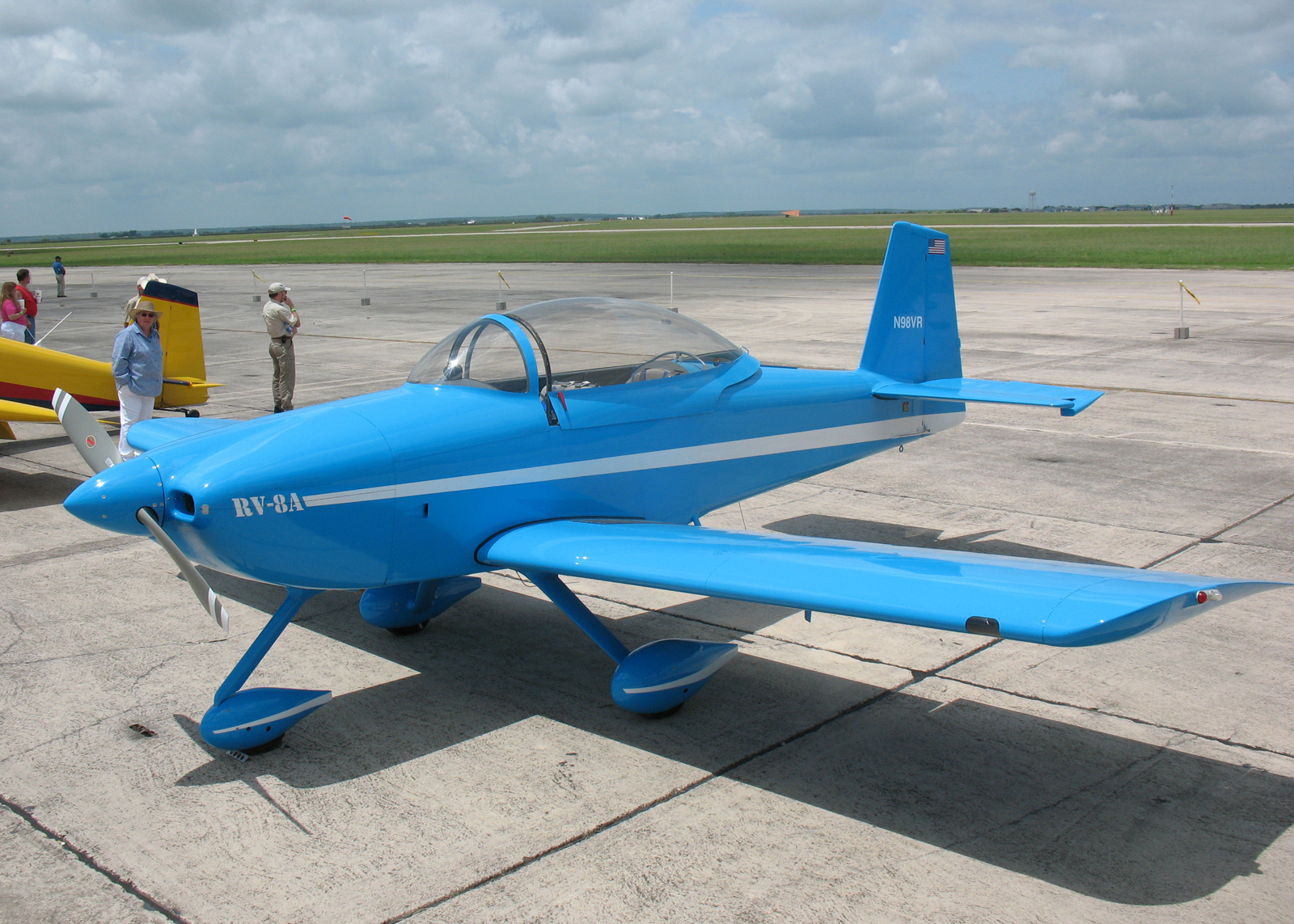
Example of a Van's aircraft, the 1995 RV-8A, based on the RV-4 design concept

Richard VanGrunsven grew up on a farm near Cornelius, Oregon and is the son of a Portland area farmer. He has seven brothers and sisters. His father had taken flying lessons prior to getting married and his stories inspired Richard and his older brother Jerry to acquire an old Piper J-3 Cub, and later a Taylorcraft. Richard learned to fly in 1956 from a 670-foot airstrip on the farm, acquiring his pilot certificate at age 16. His first aeronautical business was providing wheel pants for Taylorcraft. He graduated from the University of Portland in 1961 with an engineering degree. He then joined the United States Air Force that same year. VanGrunsven originally planned to become a fighter pilot, but a minor color vision problem that would have been acceptable in civilian aviation, but not to the Air Force, led instead to him serving three years as a communications officer. After serving in the Air Force, he worked as a designer for Hyster, an Oregon manufacturer of lift trucks. His free time was devoted to learning more about aviation. He now has earned Certified Flight Instructor, multi-engine, and Airline Transport Pilot ratings and has logged over 12,000 hours of flight time. He is also an avid glider pilot.

Towards the mid-1960s, VanGrunsven purchased a Stits Playboy homebuilt aircraft and modified it by installing a larger engine. Later, he modified the aircraft by installing cantilevered aluminum wings with flaps, creating the RV-1 in 1965. A few years later he started a clean-sheet design, the all-aluminum RV-3 single-place aircraft, which VanGrunsven introduced at the 1972 EAA AirVenture Airshow in Oshkosh, Wisconsin, where he won the "Best Aerodynamic Detailing" award for the RV-3. The aircraft set new standards of aircraft performance in the homebuilt industry, and became the genesis design for the rest of the RV-series, all which strongly resemble the RV-3.

In 1973 he founded Van's Aircraft. The RV-3 was followed by the RV-4 tandem aircraft in 1979. Van's Aircraft continued to produce new designs with good all-round performance, reasonable costs, and continuous improvement in kit quality, developing the RV series all the way up to the latest aircraft, the 2012 RV-14.

VanGrunsven commutes regularly to his company in Aurora, Oregon using aircraft of his own design. His company has sold over 18,000 kits or sets of plans, with over 7,500 aircraft completed.

Van's homebuilt designs are built in enough numbers that several groups, such as "Freedom Flight" and the thirteen-member "Team RV", have organized all-RV formation demonstration teams.

In 2006 VanGrunsven was inducted into the Oregon Aviation Hall of Fame.

At the 2012 AirVenture convention, VanGrunsven announced the now-defunct Aircraft Kit Industry Association (AKIA), an organization that promoted the kit aircraft industry and advocated for allowing flight training in amateur-built aircraft as a means of reducing accidents in that sector of aviation.

In November 2013 VanGrunsven was appointed to the board of directors of the Experimental Aircraft Association (EAA). That same year he, along with Dale Klapmeier, Burt Rutan, Bob Hoover and others, launched a campaign and website made for honoring EAA's former long-time president Tom Poberezny.

Flying magazine ranked VanGrunsven 22 on its list of the "51 Heroes of Aviation" and has labelled him the "undisputed leader in kit aircraft manufacturing".

On December 4, 2023, Van's Aircraft filed for Chapter 11 bankruptcy protection as part of a company reorganization plan.
