= ECi O-320 =

Family of four-cylinder, direct-drive engines

O-320
- Type: Piston aero-engine
- Manufacturer: Engine Components Inc.
- Major applications: Vans RV-6

The ECi O-320 is part of a family of normally aspirated, air-cooled, four-cylinder, direct-drive engines developed for certified and experimental aircraft. Its cylinders are arranged in horizontally opposed configuration and a displacement of 320 cubic inches (5.24 L). It is based on the Lycoming O-320 engine with ECi cylinder assemblies.

== Design and development ==
ECi developed engine kits starting in 1995.

== Variants ==
=== O-320 series ===
ECi O-320
154 hp (115 kW) at 2700 rpm, Minimum fuel grade 100/100LL avgas, compression ratio 7.0:1. Certified Applications
ECi OX-320
154 hp (115 kW) at 2700 rpm, Minimum fuel grade 100/100LL avgas, compression ratio 7.0:1. Experimental Variant
ECi IOX-320
156 hp (116 kW) at 2700 rpm, Minimum fuel grade 100/100LL avgas, compression ratio 7.0:1. Fuel Injected Experimental

== Applications ==
- Aviat Husky A-1B-160
- Avid Flyer
- Aero Commander 100
- Alpha 160A
- American Champion Citabria
- Australian Aircraft Kits Hornet STOL
- Australian Lightwing SP-4000 Speed
- Aviation Industries of Iran AVA-202
- Beechcraft Musketeer
- Bellanca Decathlon
- Bushcaddy L-160
- Canadian Home Rotors Safari
- Cessna 172
- Custom Flight North Star
- Christavia Mk IV
- Dakota Cub Super 18
- EM-11 Orka
- Eaves Cougar 1
- Explorer Ellipse
- Falconar F12A Cruiser
- Fly-Fan Shark
- Glasair GlaStar
- Grumman American AA-5
- Gulfstream American GA-7 Cougar
- Hatz CB-1
- Hatz Classic
- Lambert Mission 212
- MBB Bo 209
- Mooney M20
- Murphy Elite
- Mustang Aeronautics Mustang II
- Osprey Osprey 2
- Partenavia P66B Oscar 150
- Peña Dahu
- PIK-19
- Piper Aztec
- Piper Apache
- Piper PA-40 Arapaho
- Piper Twin Comanche
- Piper Cherokee
- Piper Tripacer
- Preceptor STOL King
- PZL-110 Koliber
- Quikkit Glass Goose
- Rihn DR-107 One Design
- Robin DR400
- Robinson R22
- Rutan Long-EZ
- Sands Fokker Dr.1 Triplane
- SGP M-222 Flamingo
- Socata TB9 Tampico
- Symphony SA-160
- Tapanee Levitation 2
- Thorp T-18
- Piper PA-18-150 Super Cub
- Van's Aircraft RV-3
- Van's Aircraft RV-4
- Van's Aircraft RV-6
- Van's Aircraft RV-8
- Van's Aircraft RV-9
- Varga Kachina
- Velocity V-Twin
- Vulcanair P-68C
- Wassmer WA 52
- Wickham B
- Wittman Tailwind

== Specifications (ECi O-320) ==
Data from ECi

=== General characteristics ===
- Type: Four-cylinder air-cooled horizontally opposed engine
- Bore: 5.125 in (130.18 mm)
- Stroke: 3.875 in (98.43 mm)
- Displacement: 319.7 cu in (5.24 L)
- Length: 29.07
- Width: 32.27
- Height: 24.8
- Dry weight: 244 lb (111 kg)

=== Components ===
- Valvetrain: Two overhead valves per cylinder
- Fuel system: MA4-5 Carb
- Fuel type: minimum grade of 100/100LLavgas
- Oil system: Wet sump
- Cooling system: Air-cooled

=== Performance ===
- Power output: 154 hp (115 kW)
- Compression ratio: 7:1

== See also ==
- List of aircraft engines
