= Van's Aircraft RV-7 =

American kit aircraft

RV-7
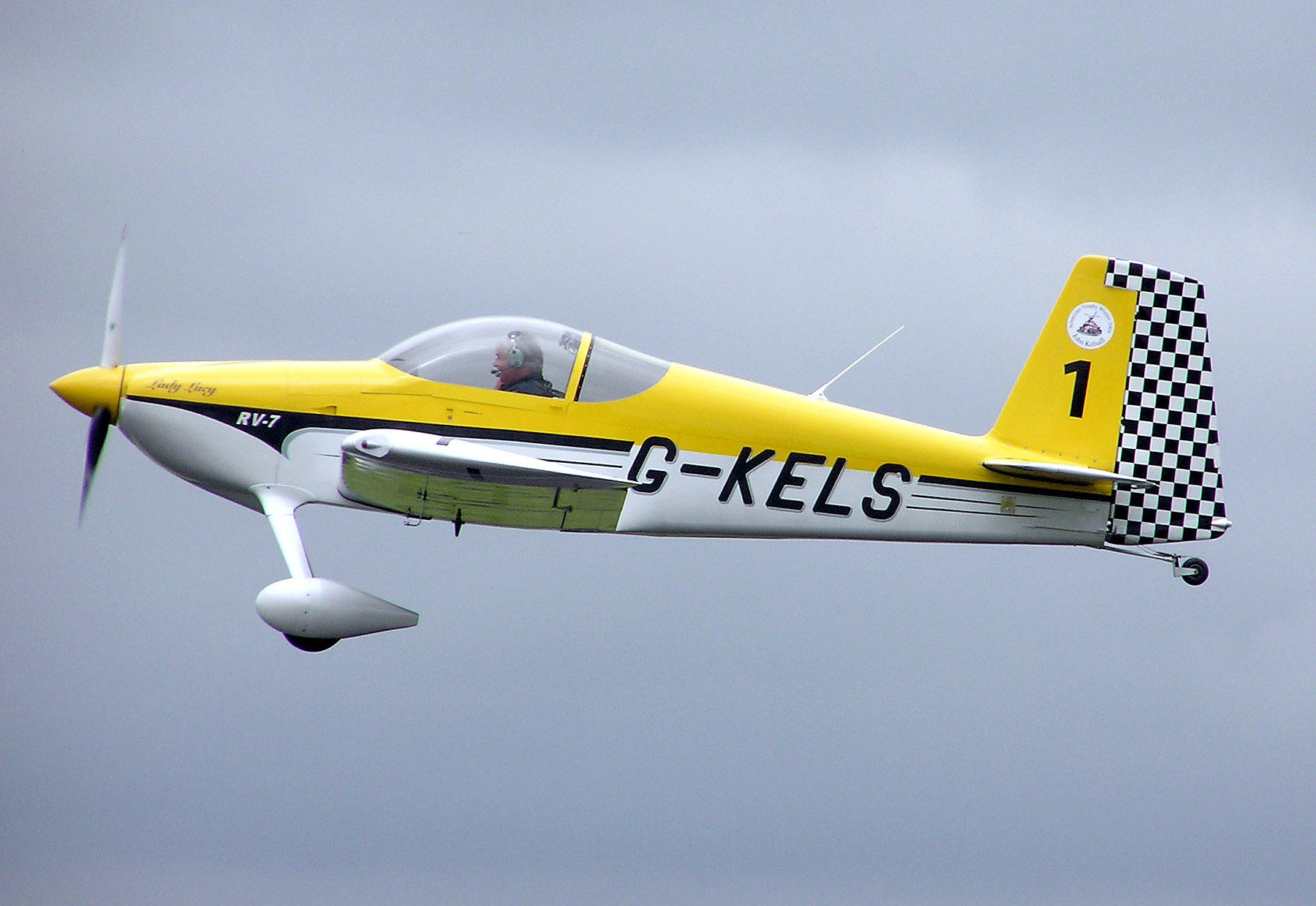

General information
- Type: RV-7
- Manufacturer: Van's Aircraft
- Designer: Richard VanGrunsven
- Number built: 1910 (December 2022)

History
- Introduction date: Early 2001
- First flight: 2001
- Developed from: Van's Aircraft RV-6
- Developed into: Van's Aircraft RV-10

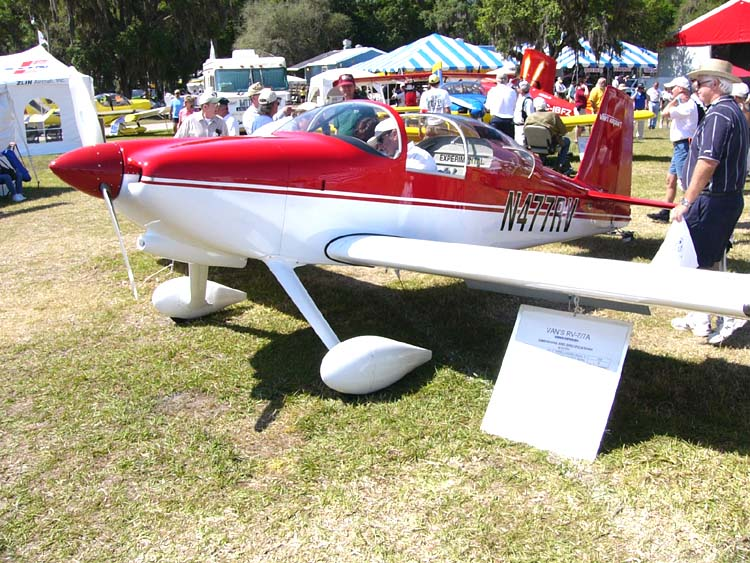
Tail wheel-equipped RV-7 on display at Sun 'n Fun 2004.

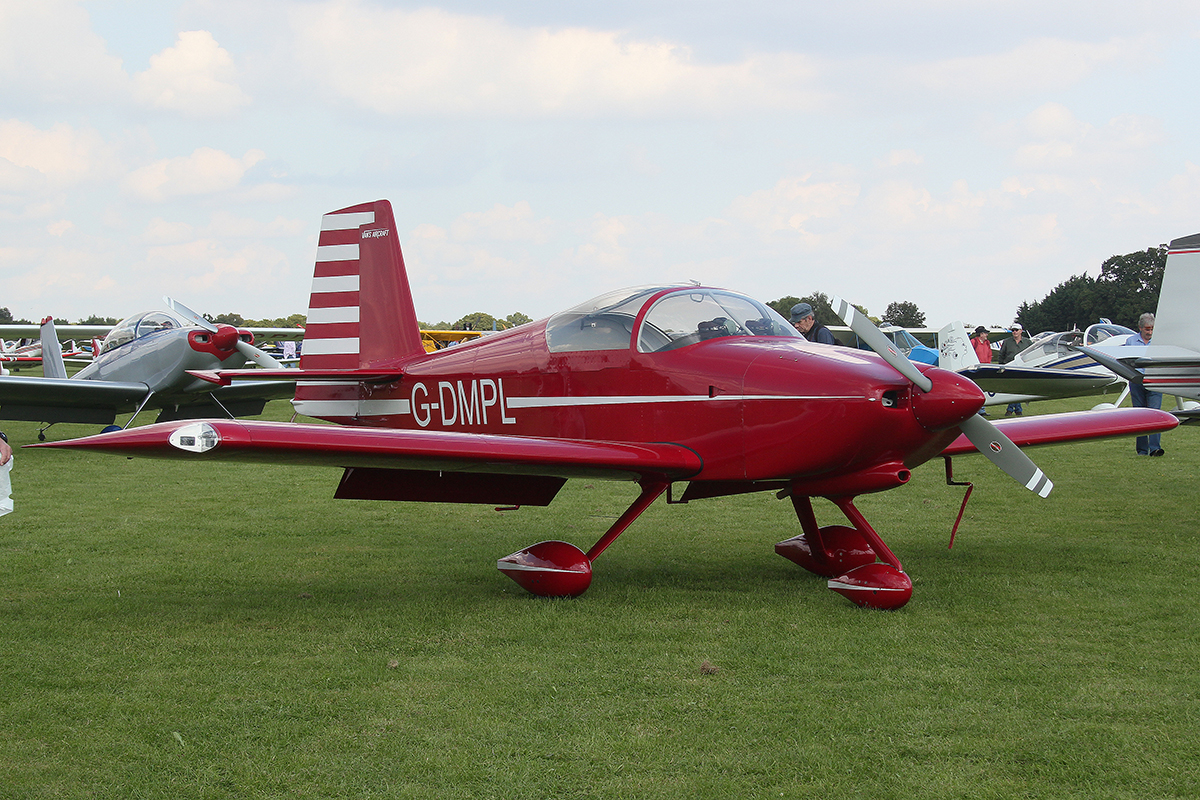
RV-7A in tricycle configuration with front nose-wheel

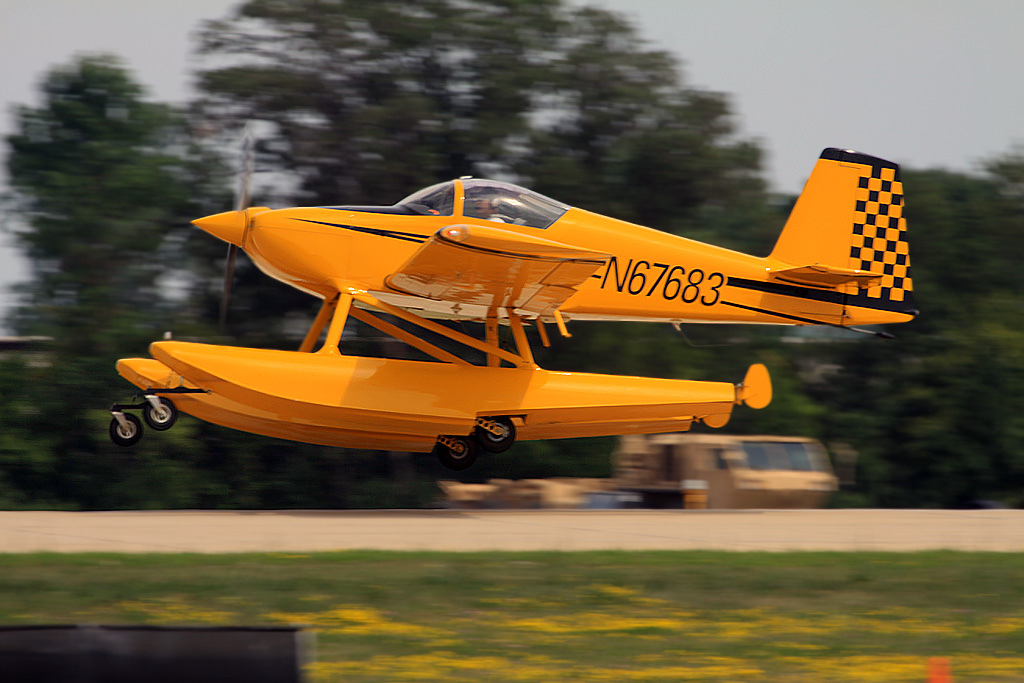
RV-7 with amphibious floats

The Van's RV-7 and RV-7A are two-seat, single-engine, low-wing homebuilt airplanes sold in kit form by Van's Aircraft. The RV-7 is the tail-wheel equipped version, while the RV-7A features a nose-wheel.

The RV-7 was the replacement of the RV-6, replacing the RV-6 in 2001. It is externally similar to the earlier model, with longer wings, larger fuel tanks and a larger rudder to improve spin recovery characteristics.

== Development ==
Van's aircraft designer Richard VanGrunsven designed the RV-7 to replace the RV-6, which was a two-seat side-by-side development of the RV-4. In turn, this was a two-seat tandem version of the single seat RV-3.

The RV-7 incorporated many changes resulting from the lessons learned in producing over 2,000 RV-6 kits. The RV-7 airframe will accept larger engines, including the Lycoming IO-390, up to 215 hp (160 kW). The RV-7 also has increased wingspan and wing area over the RV-6, as well as more headroom, legroom and an increased useful load. The RV-7 carries a total of 42 US gallons (159 litres) of fuel, up from 38 US gallons (144 litres) on the RV-6.

The RV-7 shares many common parts with the RV-8 and RV-9, which reduces production costs. The RV-7 has a computer-assisted design with pre-punched rivet holes, helping to keep assembly time to about 1500 hours for the average builder.

The RV-7A version features a hardened, solid steel nose-wheel strut that fits into a tube welded to the engine mount. As in all nose-wheel equipped RV aircraft, the nose-wheel is free castering and the aircraft is steered with differential braking, or rudder at higher taxi speeds. The brakes are conventional toe brakes.

As of November 2022, 1,909 RV-7s and RV-7As had been flown.

== Specifications (RV-7) ==
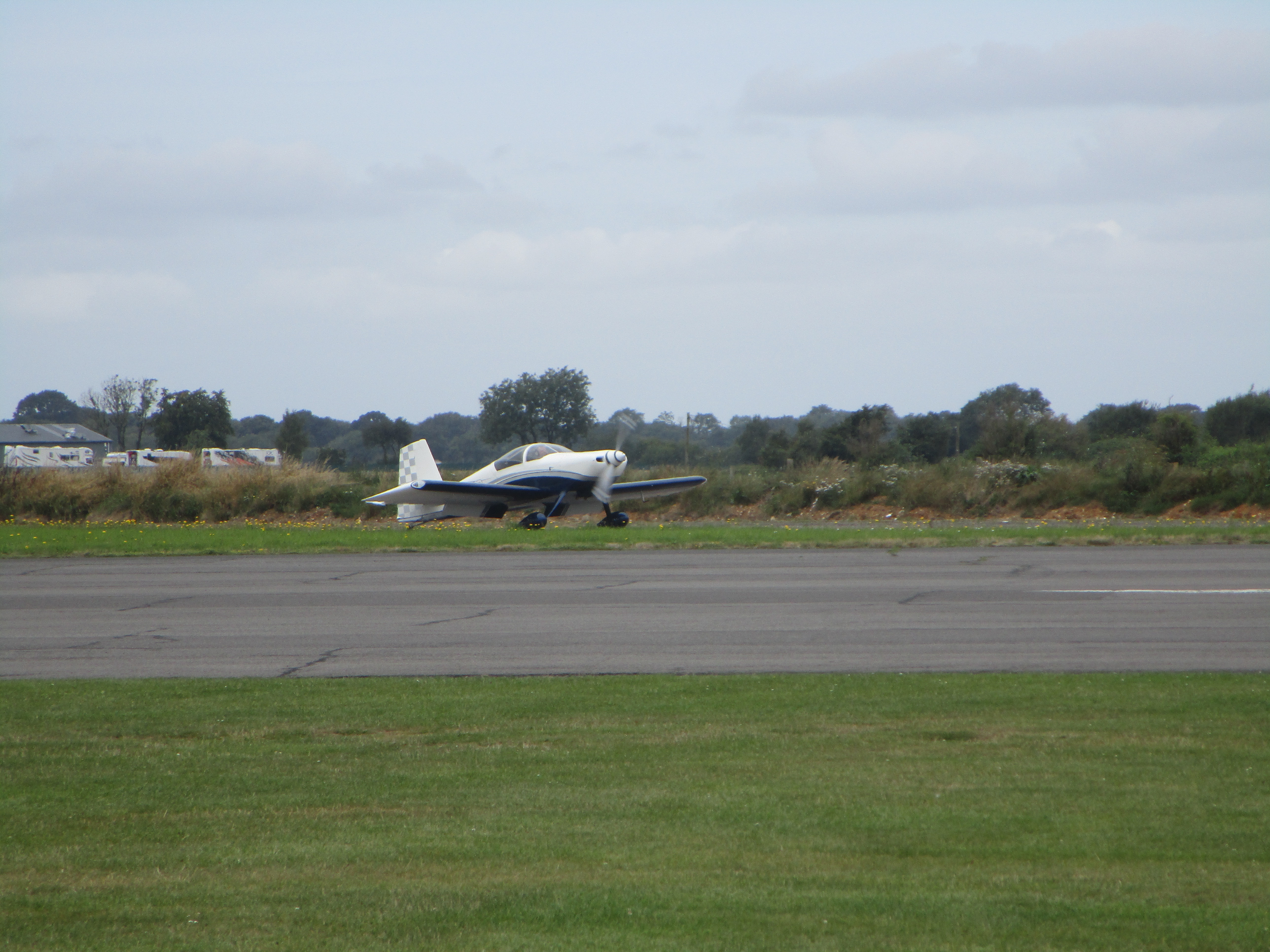
G-RDAR - Van's RV-7 taxiing at Dunkeswell Aerodrome in taildragger configuration

Specifications are given for 200 hp, IO-360 configuration with a Hartzell constant speed propeller

General characteristics

- Crew: one pilot
- Capacity: one passenger
- Length: 20 ft 4 in (6.20 m)
- Wingspan: 25 ft (7.6 m)
- Height: 5 ft 10 in (1.79 m)
- Wing area: 121 sq ft (11.2 m^{2})
- Empty weight: 1,114 lb (505 kg)
- Gross weight: 1,800 lb (816 kg)
- Max takeoff weight: 1,800 lb (816 kg)
- Powerplant: 1 × Lycoming O-320, Lycoming O-360 or Lycoming IO-390 constant speed or fixed pitch, 160 to 215 hp (119 to 160 kW)

Performance

- Maximum speed: 217 mph (349 km/h, 189 kn) at sea level
- Cruise speed: 207 mph (333 km/h, 180 kn)
- Stall speed: 51 mph (82 km/h, 44 kn)
- Never exceed speed: 230 mph (370 km/h, 200 kn)
- Range: 765 mi (1,231 km, 665 nmi) at cruise 75% power at 8,000 ft (2,500 m)
- Service ceiling: 22,500 ft (6,900 m)
- Rate of climb: 1,900 ft/min (9.7 m/s)
- Wing loading: 14.8 lb/sq ft (72 kg/m^{2})

== See also ==
Related development

- Van's Aircraft RV-6
- Van's Aircraft RV-9

Aircraft of comparable role, configuration, and era

- Europa XS
- Grumman American AA-1
- Rand Robinson KR-1
- Thorp T-18
