= Van's Aircraft RV-9 =

American kit aircraft

RV-9
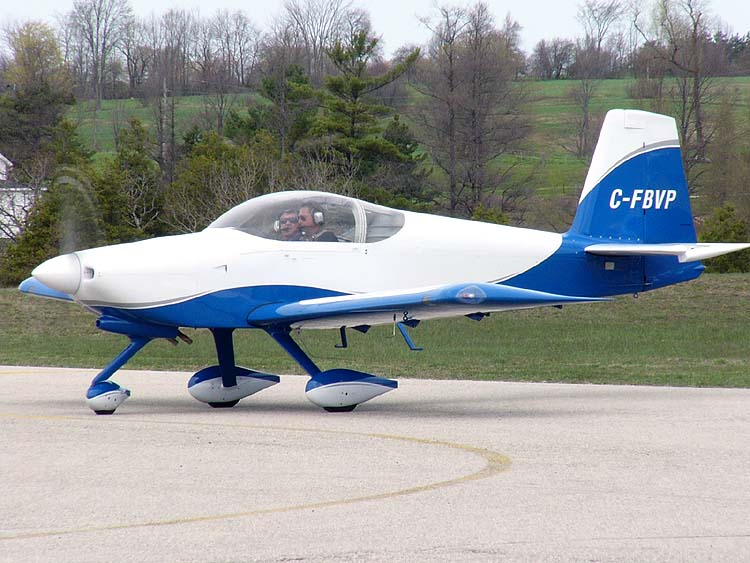
- Van's Aircraft RV-9A

General information
- Type: Kit aircraft
- National origin: United States
- Manufacturer: Van's Aircraft
- Designer: Richard VanGrunsven
- Number built: 1173 (November 2022)

History
- Introduction date: Early 2001
- First flight: December 1997

The Van's RV-9 and RV-9A are American two-seat, single-engine, low-wing homebuilt airplanes sold in kit form by Van's Aircraft of Aurora, Oregon. The RV-9 is the tail-wheel equipped version while the RV-9A features a nose-wheel.

The RV-9 was built around a newly designed high aspect ratio wing, featuring a Roncz airfoil. It is similar in size and weight to the RV-6 and is externally similar to the RV-6 and the RV-7.

== Development ==
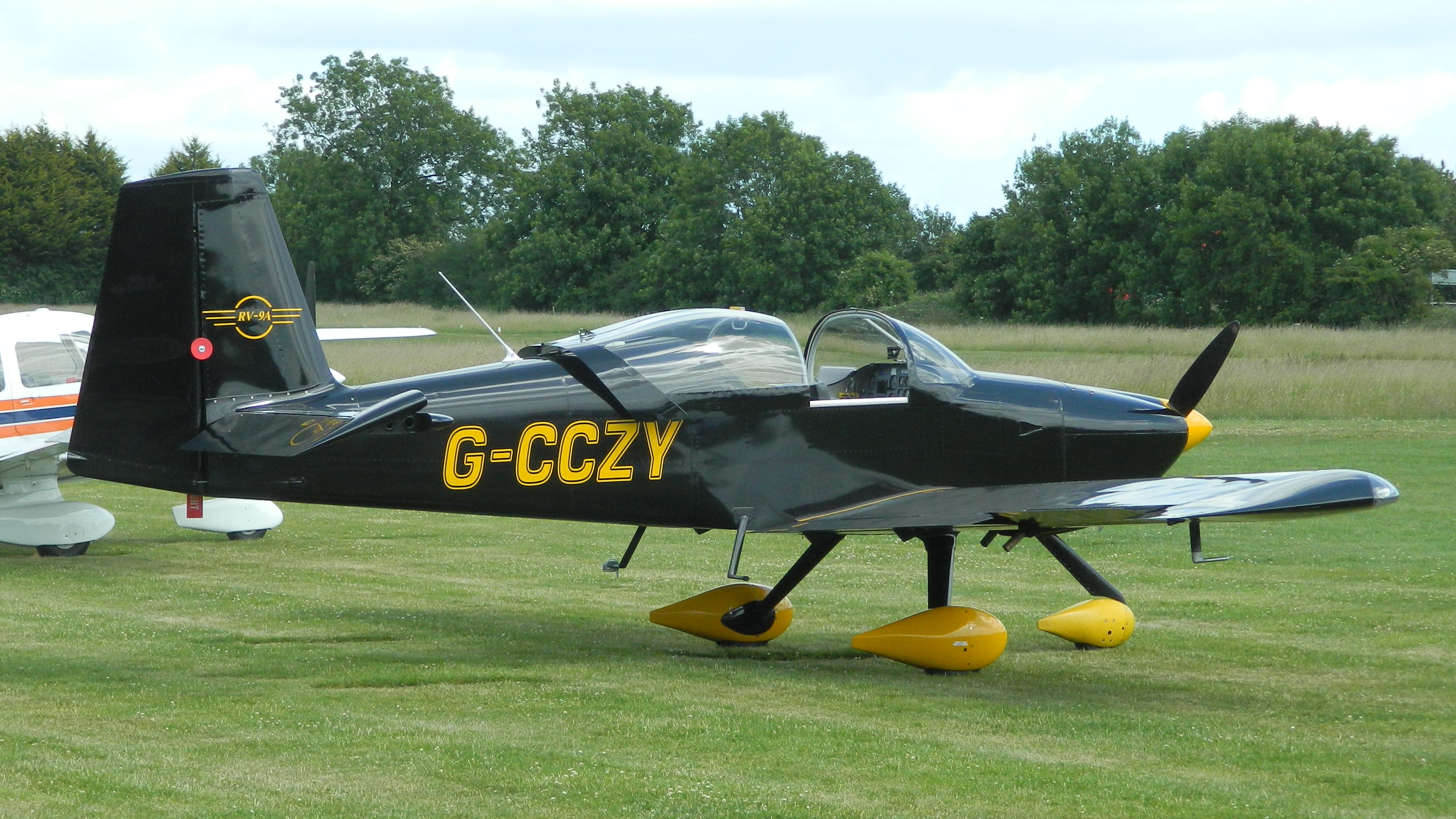
2006 amateur built RV-9A

The architect of the line of Van's aircraft, Richard VanGrunsven, designed the RV-9 as a departure from the concepts of the earlier RV series. The earlier members of the RV series, starting with the single seat RV-3, were all designed to have light handling, aerobatic capabilities along with high cruise speeds and short takeoff and landing (STOL) capabilities. The RV-9 was designed from the start as a two-place, side-by-side, touring aircraft and as such it forgoes the aerobatic capabilities and the lighter handling for more stability and economy. As such the design horsepower is 118–160 and the prototype was flown with a Lycoming O-235 powerplant of 118 hp (88 kW) as a proof-of-concept for the lower horsepower.

As a result of the lessons learned over the years in producing the first five RV-series designs and the change in role for this aircraft, the RV-9 design incorporated many changes over previous designs.

The RV-9A was the first to use what Van's calls "matched-hole" components in that airframe parts are formed to the required contour and have all the rivet holes precisely located. The assembly jigs normally used to ensure alignment are not necessary and build time is much reduced. Later models, such as the RV-7 and RV-10, use this same manufacturing technique.

Compared to the similar RV-7, the RV-9 has a wing of increased span and higher aspect ratio using a Roncz airfoil. The RV-9 has a low stall speed, comparable to the Cessna 150, and docile handling suitable for low-time pilots. The cruise speed is a very respectable 167 mph (269 km/h) TAS even with the 118 hp (88 kW) engine.

The RV-9 was offered after the RV-8, but before the RV-7 and shares many common parts with both aircraft, which reduces production costs. Like those aircraft, the RV-9 uses computer assisted design to produce a kit with pre-drilled rivet holes, thus greatly reducing assembly time for the builder.

The RV-9 is unique in Van's aircraft history in that the tricycle gear RV-9A version was flown first on June 15, 2000, three years before the tail wheel version flew. The later conventional landing gear equipped RV-9 was first flown by its designer in 2002. The RV-9A features solid circular spring steel landing gear with the nosewheel mounting tube welded to the engine mount. As in all nose-wheel equipped RV aircraft, the nosewheel is free castering and the aircraft is steered with differential braking. The brakes are mounted conventionally on the rudder pedal toes.

As of November 2022, 1173 RV-9s and RV-9As have been completed and flown.

== Specifications (RV-9A with Lycoming O-320) ==
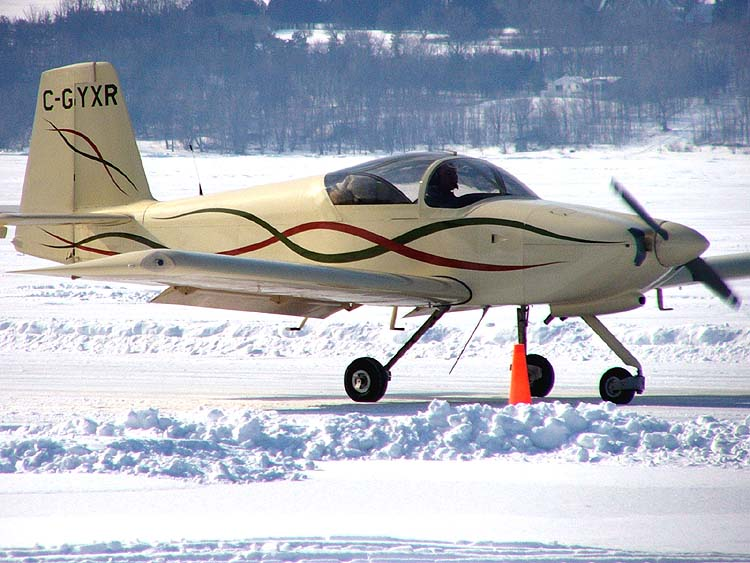
An RV-9A – the nose wheel equipped version of the RV-9 at an ice strip fly-in near Ottawa, Ontario 2005

Data from Van's Aircraft

General characteristics

- Crew: one
- Capacity: one passenger
- Length: 20 ft 5 in (6.22 m)
- Wingspan: 28 ft (8.5 m)
- Height: 7 ft 10 in (2.39 m)
- Wing area: 124 sq ft (11.5 m^{2})
- Empty weight: 1,028 lb (466 kg)
- Gross weight: 1,750 lb (794 kg)
- Fuel capacity: 36 US gallons (136 litres)
- Powerplant: 1 × Lycoming O-320 , 160 hp (120 kW)
- Propellers: 2-bladed fixed pitch

Performance

- Maximum speed: 197 mph (317 km/h, 171 kn)
- Cruise speed: 189 mph (304 km/h, 164 kn) at 75% power and 8000 feet
- Stall speed: 44 mph (71 km/h, 38 kn)
- Range: 710 mi (1,140 km, 620 nmi) at 55% power at 8000 feet
- Service ceiling: 24,500 ft (7,500 m)
- Rate of climb: 1,400 ft/min (7.1 m/s)
- Wing loading: 12.9 lb/sq ft (63 kg/m^{2})

== See also ==
Related development

- Van's Aircraft RV-6
- Van's Aircraft RV-7

Aircraft of comparable role, configuration, and era

- Europa XS
- Grumman American AA-1
- Rand Robinson KR-1
- Thorp T-18
