= Canton Airport =

Canton Airport can refer to:

- Guangzhou Baiyun International Airport (China)
- Guangzhou Baiyun International Airport (former) (China)
- Akron-Canton Regional Airport (Ohio, USA)
- Canton–Plymouth Mettetal Airport (Michigan, USA)
