= Aircraft Technologies Atlantis =

Atlantis
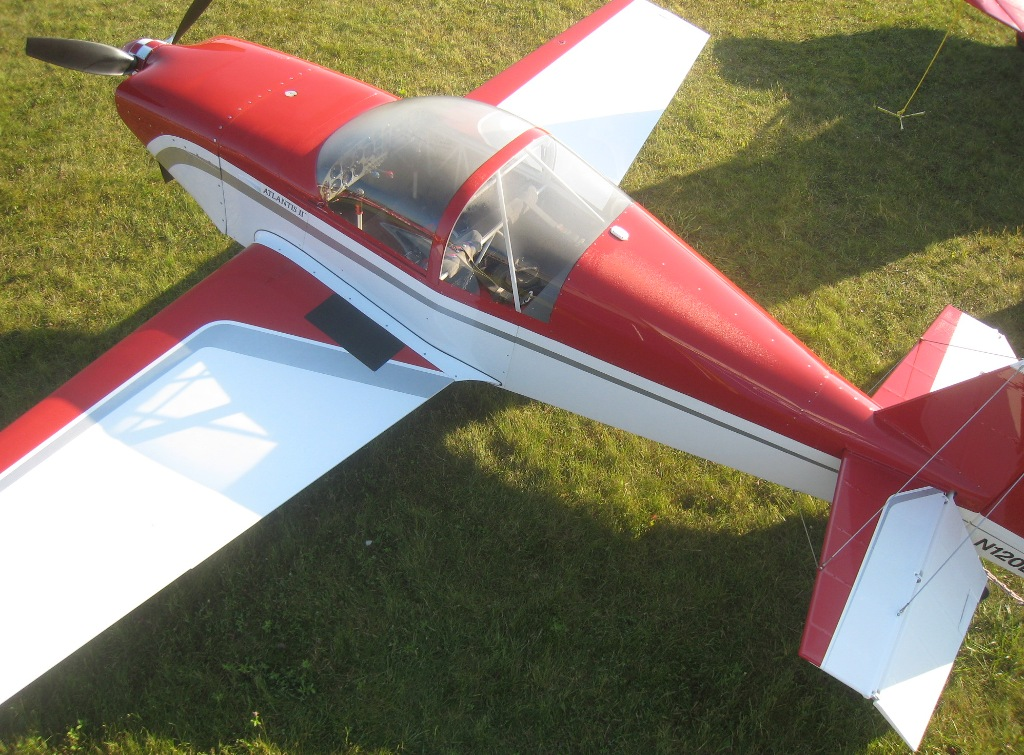
- Atlantis II

General information
- Type: Homebuilt aircraft
- National origin: United States
- Manufacturer: Aircraft Technologies
- Designer: Fred Meyers
- Number built: at least three

History
- Introduction date: 1996

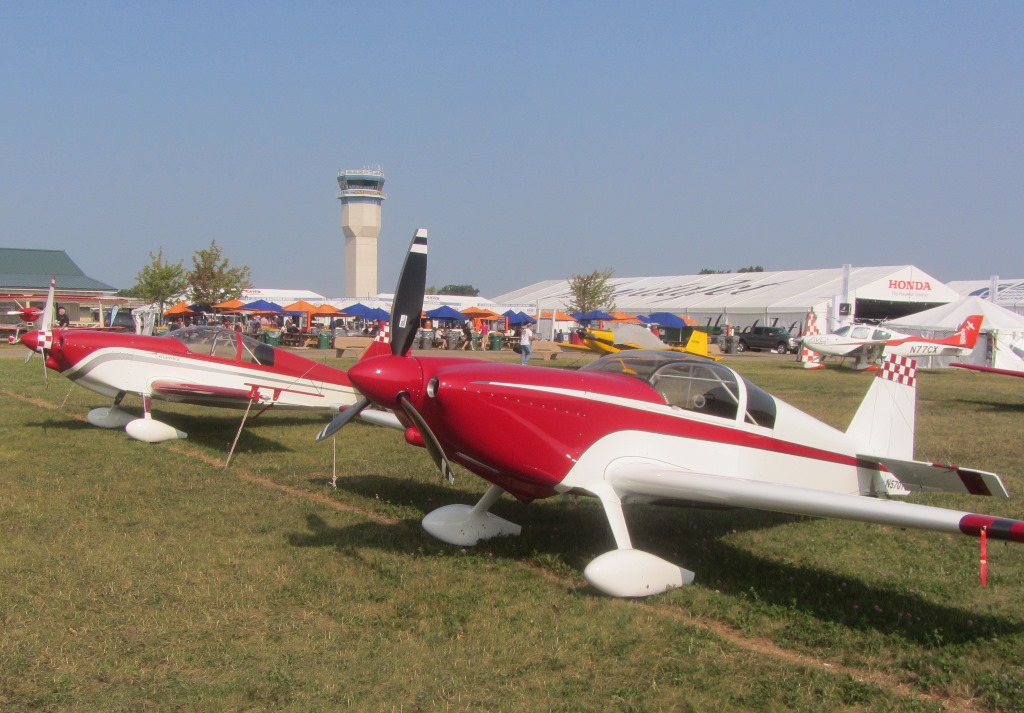
A pair of Atlantis

The Aircraft Technologies Atlantis is an American aerobatic homebuilt aircraft, built by Aircraft Technologies of Lilburn, Georgia. The aircraft is supplied as a kit or in the form of plans for amateur construction.

== Design ==
The Atlantis is a two-seat side-by side low wing aircraft with conventional landing gear. The fuselage is constructed of welded steel tubing. Fuel tanks are located in the wings, with a central header tank. The aircraft uses two control sticks for each pilot and a pull-up flap handle between the seats. The seats recline to a 35 degree angle.

== Operational history ==
In November 2014 three examples were registered in the United States with the Federal Aviation Administration.

== Development ==
The Atlantis was an original design by Fred Meyer and was essentially a scaled-up, side-by-side two-seat development of the single-seat Acro 1. The first aircraft, N2118L, first flew in early 1996 with a 200 hp Lycoming IO-360 engine. It was intended both as a two-seat aerobatic trainer and as a single-seater for aerobatic competition, was stressed to +15 g and −15 g, and was suited to engines in the 150–250 hp range. Kit deliveries from Aircraft Technologies of Lilburn, Georgia, began in 1998, and at least one example, N570TC, built by Timothy Cook of Byrdstown, Tennessee, was fitted with a 250 hp Lycoming IO-540 engine.

== Atlantis II ==
An improved Atlantis II was introduced in 1999, with a lengthened fuselage, a roomier cockpit, and refined construction components and production techniques. The first Atlantis II, N120BS (c/n 004), was built by Bill R. Shain of Coal City, Illinois, and was powered by a Lycoming AEIO-360 engine.

== Contemporary coverage ==
The Atlantis was covered in the Experimental Aircraft Association's magazines on its introduction, including photo items in Sport Aviation (June 1996, p. 42) and Sport Aerobatics (July 1996, p. 16), a seven-page feature, "The Atlantis", in the August 1996 Sport Aviation (p. 40), and an eight-page flying qualities report in the March 1997 Sport Aviation (p. 46). Sport Aerobatics later profiled Bill Shain's Atlantis II in March 2004 (p. 16).

== Specifications (Atlantis) ==
Data from Sport Aviation

General characteristics

- Crew: 1
- Capacity: 1 passenger
- Empty weight: 1,100 lb (499 kg)
- Gross weight: 1,900 lb (862 kg)
- Fuel capacity: 60 U.S. gallons (230 L; 50 imp gal)
- Powerplant: 1 × Lycoming IO-360 horizontally opposed piston aircraft engine, 200 hp (150 kW)
- Propellers: 2-bladed MT constant speed

Performance

- Cruise speed: 155 kn (178 mph, 287 km/h)
- Stall speed: 43 kn (50 mph, 80 km/h)
- g limits: +/-20g wing, +/-15g fuselage and tail
- Roll rate: 200 degrees per second
- Wing loading: 95 lb/sq ft (460 kg/m^{2})

== See also ==
Aircraft of comparable role, configuration, and era

- Van's Aircraft RV-6

Related lists

- List of aerobatic aircraft
