= Canton–Plymouth Mettetal Airport =

Canton–Plymouth Mettetal Airport Mettetal Airport
- IATA: none; ICAO: none; FAA LID: 1D2

Summary
- Airport type: Public
- Owner: State of Michigan - MDOT
- Serves: Plymouth, Michigan
- Elevation AMSL: 696 ft (212 m)
- Coordinates: 42°20′53″N 083°27′23″W

Map
- Location of airport in Michigan 1D2 (the United States)

Runways
Direction	Length		Surface
Direction	ft	m	Surface
18/36	2,303	702	Asphalt

Statistics (2020)
- Aircraft operations: 13,870
- Based aircraft: 78
- Source: Federal Aviation Administration

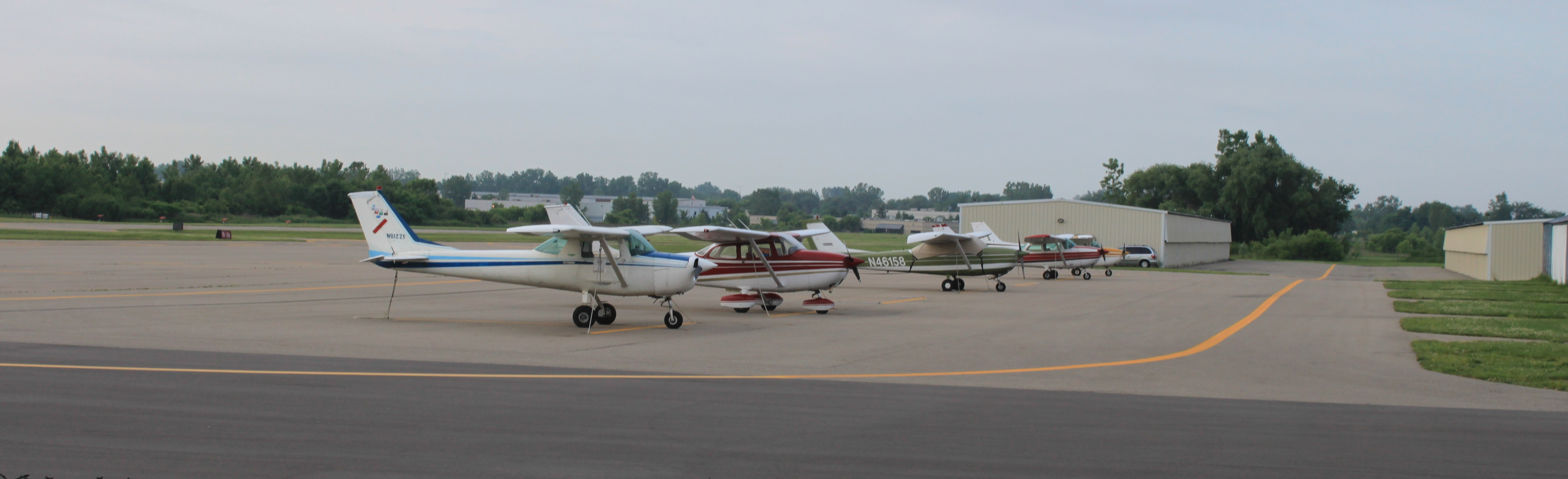
Tarmac area

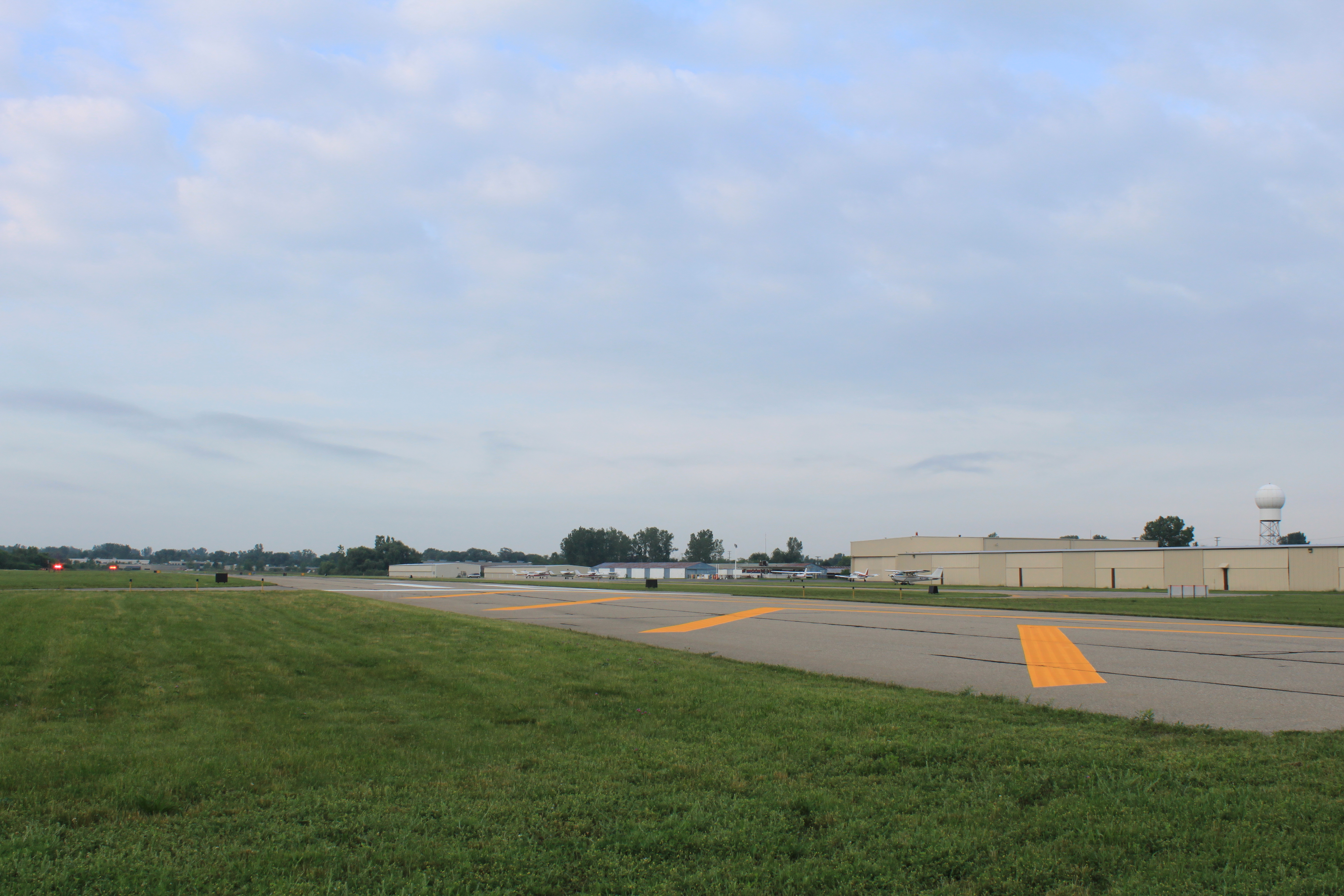
Runway viewed from Joy Road

Canton–Plymouth Mettetal Airport (FAA LID: 1D2) is a public use airport located in Canton Township, Michigan, United States. The airport lies two nautical miles (3.7 km) south of the central business district of Plymouth, in Wayne County. The airport is owned and operated by the Michigan Department of Transportation (MDOT). It is also referred to as Mettetal Airport. The airport is uncontrolled (non-towered) and is used for general aviation purposes.

It is included in the Federal Aviation Administration (FAA) National Plan of Integrated Airport Systems for 2017–2021, in which it is categorized as a local reliever airport facility.

In 2017, the airport was home to a prototype flying cars produced by Detroit Flying Cars. The company's goal was to produce an aircraft that both drove like a standards car and flew like a standard aircraft. The project has been exhibited at shows such as the EAA AirVenture Airshow in Oshkosh, Wisconsin.

== History ==
The airport was founded in the 1930s as a grass strip to support crop dusting for nearby farmers. It was established as a public-use airport in 1939.

== Facilities and aircraft ==
Canton–Plymouth Mettetal Airport covers an area of 63 acres (25 ha) at an elevation of 696 feet (212 m) above mean sea level. It has one runway designated 18/36 with an asphalt surface measuring 2,303 by 75 feet (702 x 23 m). No commercial airline service is available, although many small flight schools are based there. Due to the short runway length, touch and go operations, commonly used in flight training, are prohibited.

For the 12-month period ending December 31, 2020, the airport had 13,870 general aviation aircraft operations, an average of 38 per day. For the same time period, there were 78 aircraft based at the field: 72 single-engine and 3 multi-engine airplanes as well as 3 helicopters.

In late 2015, the airport was damaged by a sudden, unforecasted tornado.

The airport has several hangars for aircraft storage. In early 2022, a new helicopter-focused hangar opened that doubled available hangar space.

The airport has a fixed-base operator, which offers fuel as well as aircraft parking.

== Accidents and incidents ==
- On April 18, 1998, a Cessna 150 crashed just south of the airport during a training flight. The aircraft had just departed Canton–Plymouth Mettetal Airport en route to Willow Run when the engine lost power, and the aircraft executed a forced landing in a nearby field.
- On October 20, 2002, a Piper PA-32 Cherokee Six crashed while landing at Canton. The aircraft went off the side of the runway and struck the VASI lighting system, after which the aircraft caught fire. The probable cause was found to be the pilot's failure to maintain directional control of the aircraft as well as inoperative right main landing gear brake. Contributing factors include a failed brake master cylinder seal, an inadequate preflight inspection by the pilot, a fuel fire, and the pilot's decision to operate the aircraft with a known brake problem.
- On October 14, 2019, a Vans RV-4 crashed during landing at Canton-Plymouth.

== See also ==
- List of airports in Michigan
