= Rihn DR-109 =

American homebuilt aerobatic aircraft

DR-109
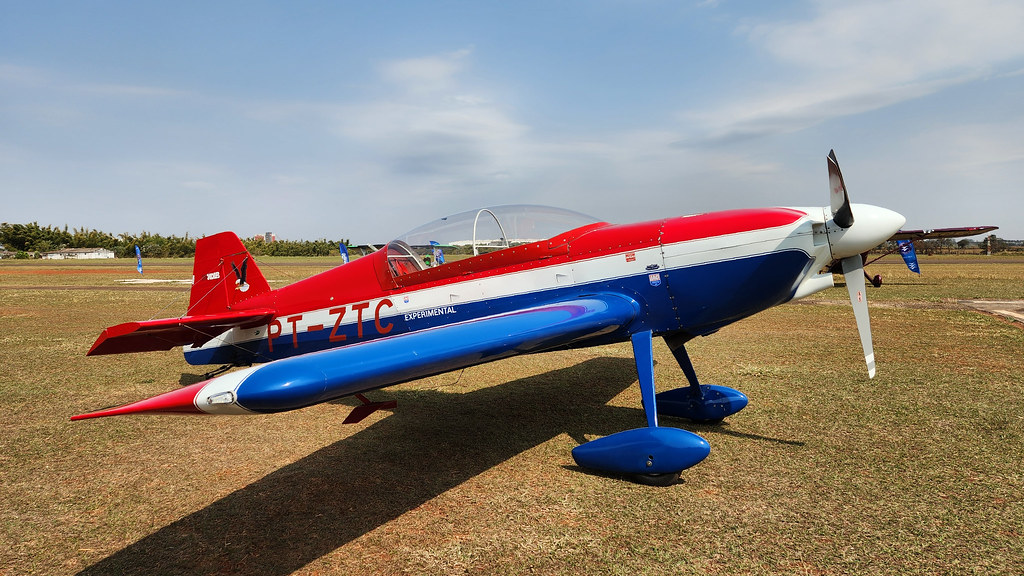

General information
- Type: Homebuilt aircraft
- National origin: United States
- Manufacturer: Ashcraft Aero Works
- Designer: Dan Rihn
- Status: Plans available (2013)
- Number built: at least 12 (2013)

History
- Developed from: Rihn DR-107 "One Design"

The Rihn DR-109 is an American aerobatic homebuilt aircraft that was designed by Dan Rihn. The aircraft was supplied by Jim Kimball Enterprises of Zellwood, Florida and more recently by Ashcraft Aero Works of Aurora, Illinois in the form of plans. It was designed for competition aerobatics as well as a trainer for the Rihn DR-107 "One Design".

== Design and development ==
The DR-109 is a monoplane that features a cantilever low-wing, two seats in a tandem enclosed cockpit under a bubble canopy, fixed conventional landing gear with wheel pants and a single engine in tractor configuration.

The aircraft fuselage is made from welded 4130 steel tubing, covered in sheet aluminum. The tail surfaces feature steel tube spars, sheet aluminum ribs, are covered with doped aircraft fabric and are cable-braced. The 24.0 ft (7.3 m) span wing is constructed in one piece and has Douglas fir spars with plywood ribs and covering. The wing employs a Wainfan 16% symmetrical airfoil and has a wing area of 114.00 sq ft (10.591 m^{2}). The wing has almost full-span ailerons and no flaps. Other features include a 48 in (121.9 cm) wide cockpit.

The DR-109 can accept engines of 200 to 300 hp (149 to 224 kW). The standard powerplant used is the 260 hp (194 kW) Lycoming AEIO-540-D4A5 six cylinder, air-cooled, four stroke aircraft engine.

The aircraft has an empty weight of 1,495 lb (678 kg) and a gross weight of 2,275 lb (1,032 kg), giving a useful load of 780 lb (350 kg). With full fuel of 46 U.S. gallons (170 L; 38 imp gal) the payload is 504 lb (229 kg).

The designer estimates the construction time as 1300 hours.

== Operational history ==
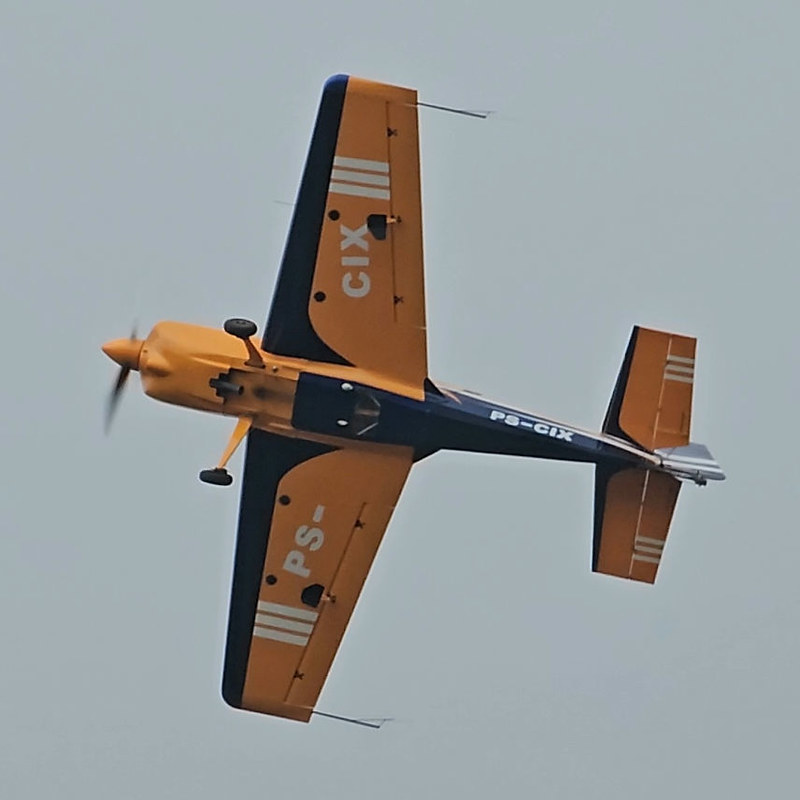
DR-109 flying in Brazil

In November 2013 11 examples were registered in the United States with the Federal Aviation Administration, with another one previously registered and now removed. As of April 2026 there are two registered in Brazil.

== Specifications (DR-109) ==
Data from AeroCrafter and Lednicer

General characteristics

- Crew: one
- Capacity: one passenger
- Length: 22 ft 0 in (6.71 m)
- Wingspan: 24 ft 0 in (7.32 m)
- Wing area: 114.00 sq ft (10.591 m^{2})
- Airfoil: Wainfan 16% symmetrical
- Empty weight: 1,495 lb (678 kg)
- Gross weight: 2,275 lb (1,032 kg)
- Fuel capacity: 46 U.S. gallons (170 L; 38 imp gal)
- Powerplant: 1 × Lycoming AEIO-540-D4A5 six cylinder, air-cooled, four stroke aircraft engine, 260 hp (190 kW)
- Propellers: 3-bladed constant speed propeller

Performance

- Maximum speed: 205 mph (330 km/h, 178 kn)
- Cruise speed: 178 mph (286 km/h, 155 kn)
- Stall speed: 58 mph (93 km/h, 50 kn)
- Range: 534 mi (859 km, 464 nmi)
- Rate of climb: 2,800 ft/min (14 m/s)
- Wing loading: 19.96 lb/sq ft (97.5 kg/m^{2})

== See also ==
- List of aerobatic aircraft
