= Aircraft Technologies Acro 1 =

American homebuilt airplane

Acro 1
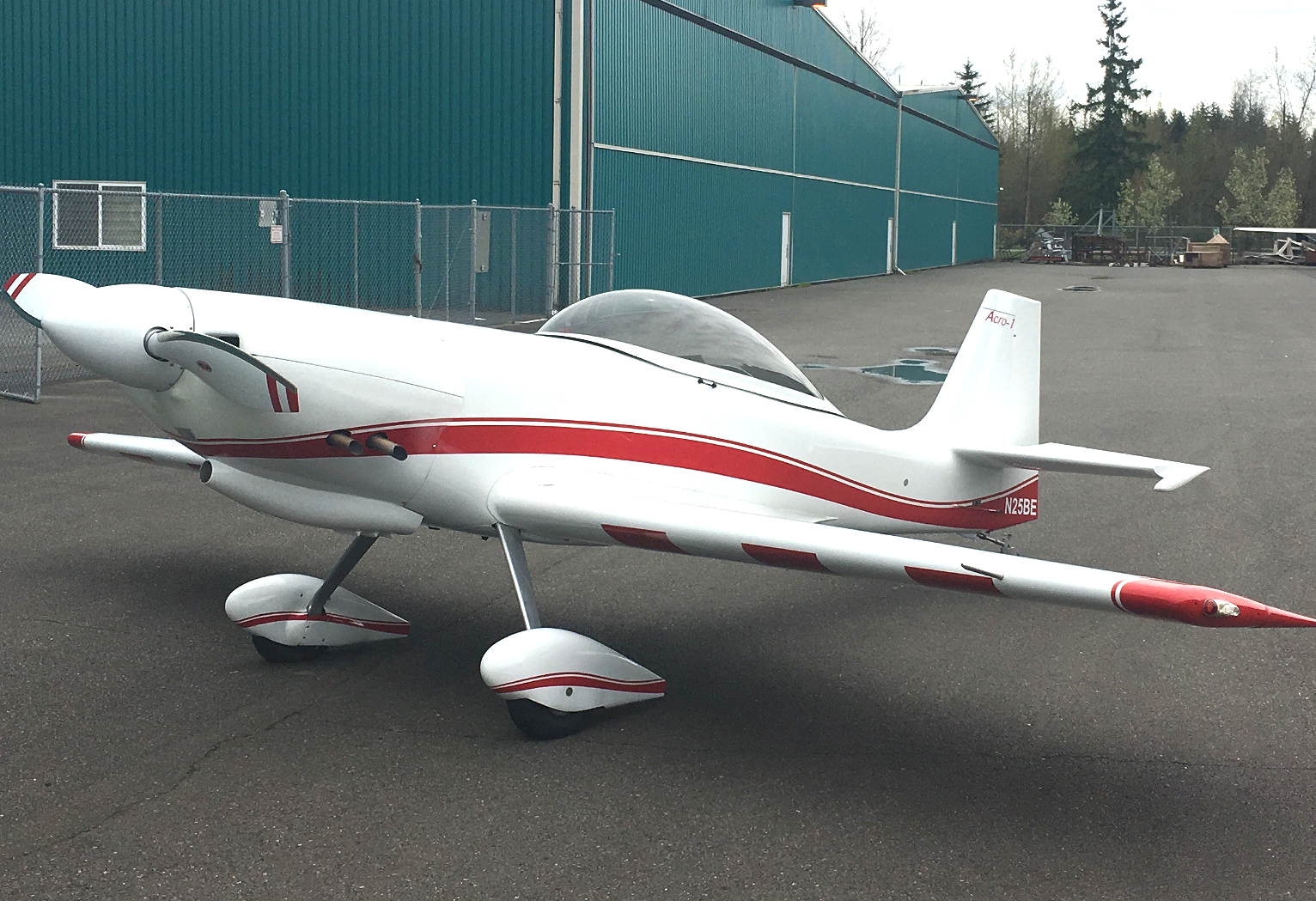

General information
- Type: Homebuilt aircraft
- National origin: United States
- Manufacturer: Aircraft Technologies
- Designer: Fred Meyer
- Status: Production completed
- Number built: At least three (2013)

History
- First flight: 1993

The Aircraft Technologies Acro 1 is an American aerobatic homebuilt aircraft that was designed by Fred Meyer and produced by Aircraft Technologies of Lilburn, Georgia. When it was available the aircraft was supplied as a kit or in the form of plans for amateur construction. Neither plans nor kits are available anymore and the aircraft is out of production.

== Design and development ==
Designed as a high-speed, long-range cross country and aerobatic aircraft, the Acro 1 features a cantilever low-wing, a single-seat enclosed cockpit under a bubble canopy, fixed conventional landing gear and a single engine in tractor configuration. The aircraft is stressed to +/-15g.

The aircraft is made from graphite and fiberglass composites. Its 20.00 ft (6.1 m) span wing has a wing area of 75.00 sq ft (6.968 m^{2}) and has no flaps. The acceptable power range is 100 to 210 hp (75 to 157 kW) and the standard engine used is the 200 hp (149 kW) Lycoming IO-360 powerplant which gives it a cruise speed of 220 mph (350 km/h). A fuel capacity of 47 U.S. gallons (180 L; 39 imp gal) provides a range of 1,000 mi (1,600 km).

The Acro 1 has an empty weight of 780 lb (350 kg) and a gross weight of 1,250 lb (570 kg), giving a useful load of 470 lb (210 kg). With full fuel of 47 U.S. gallons (180 L; 39 imp gal) the payload is 188 lb (85 kg).

The manufacturer estimates the construction time from the supplied kit as 700 hours.

== Operational history ==
By 1998 the company reported that one example had been flown.

In November 2014 three examples were registered in the United States with the Federal Aviation Administration.

== Specifications (Acro 1) ==
Data from AeroCrafter

General characteristics

- Crew: one
- Length: 17 ft 0 in (5.18 m)
- Wingspan: 20 ft 0 in (6.10 m)
- Wing area: 75.00 sq ft (6.968 m^{2})
- Empty weight: 780 lb (354 kg)
- Gross weight: 1,250 lb (567 kg)
- Fuel capacity: 47 U.S. gallons (180 L; 39 imp gal)
- Powerplant: 1 × Lycoming IO-360 four cylinder, air-cooled, fuel injected four stroke aircraft engine, 200 hp (150 kW)
- Propellers: 2-bladed constant speed propeller

Performance

- Maximum speed: 245 mph (394 km/h, 213 kn)
- Cruise speed: 220 mph (350 km/h, 190 kn)
- Stall speed: 58 mph (93 km/h, 50 kn)
- Range: 1,000 mi (1,600 km, 870 nmi)
- Service ceiling: 25,000 ft (7,600 m)
- g limits: +/-15
- Rate of climb: 3,000 ft/min (15 m/s)
- Wing loading: 16.67 lb/sq ft (81.4 kg/m^{2})

== See also ==
Aircraft of comparable role, configuration, and era

- Giles G-200
- Rihn DR-107 One Design
- Van's RV-3

Related lists

- List of aerobatic aircraft
