= Aircraft Technologies =

American aircraft manufacturer

- Company type: Privately held company
- Industry: Aerospace
- Founded: 1990s
- Fate: Out of business
- Headquarters: Lilburn, Georgia, United States
- Key people: Fred Meyers
- Products: Kit aircraft

Aircraft Technologies, Inc. was an American aircraft manufacturer based in Lilburn, Georgia. The company specialized in the design and manufacture of aerobatic aircraft in the form of kits for amateur construction.

The company is out of business and its products are no longer available.

The company's kits used fiberglass, carbon fiber and 4130 steel tubing construction. Both the Aircraft Technologies Atlantis and the Acro 1 were engineered for +15/-15 g.

== Aircraft ==
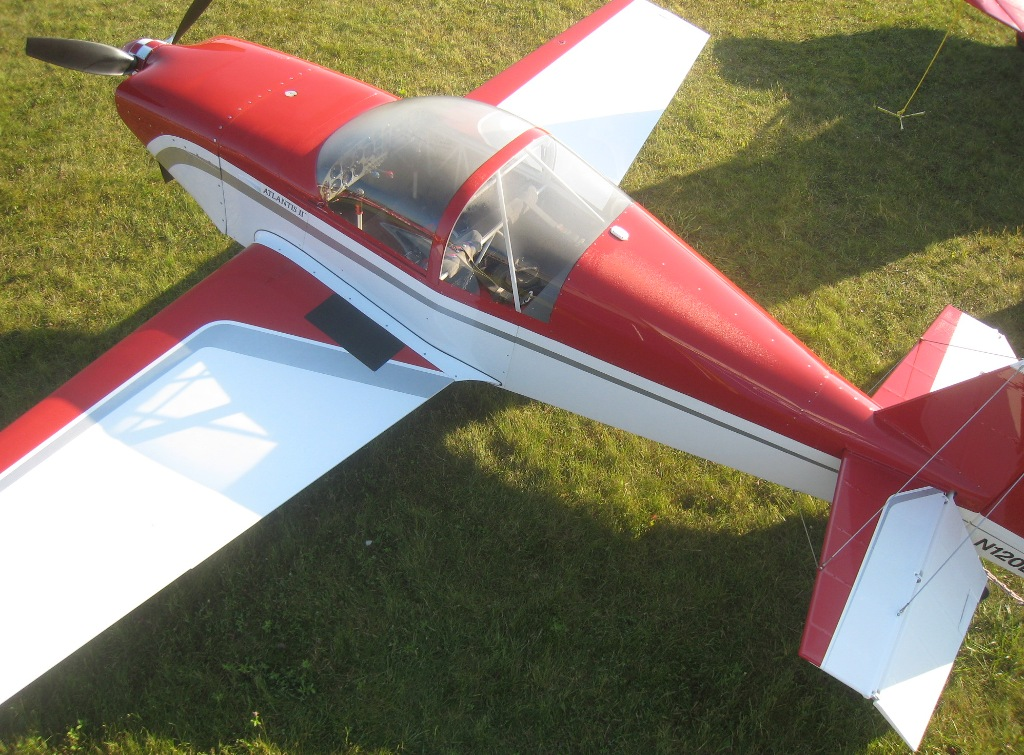
Aircraft Technologies Atlantis.

Summary of aircraft built by Aircraft Technologies, Inc.
Model name	First flight	Number built	Type
Aircraft Technologies Atlantis	1990s	at least three	Two-seat aerobatic monoplane
Aircraft Technologies Acro 1	1990s	at least three	Single-seat aerobatic monoplane
