= Aviation Industries of Iran AVA-202 =

Iranian light aircraft

AVA-202 (آوا-202)

General information
- Type: Training aircraft
- National origin: Iran
- Manufacturer: Aviation Industries of Iran
- Number built: 4 by 2002

History
- Introduction date: 1997
- First flight: 3 June 1997
- Developed from: Van's Aircraft RV-6A

The Aviation Industries of Iran AVA-202 is an Iranian two-seat, light aircraft designed as a trainer and sporting aircraft. It was intended for the Iranian domestic market to avoid dependence on imports.

== Design and development ==
The AVA-202 was based on the Van's Aircraft RV-6A and was designed to comply with European JAR-22 and JAR-VLA aircraft certification rules. It features a cantilever low-wing, a two-seats-in-side-by-side configuration enclosed cockpit under a bubble canopy, fixed tricycle landing gear and a single engine in tractor configuration.

The aircraft is made from aluminum sheet. Its 8.74 m (28.7 ft) span wing employs a NACA 63-215 airfoil at the wing root and a NACA 63-015 airfoil at the wing tip. The wingspan is greater than the RV-6's wingspan of 7.01 m (23.0 ft) from which it is derived. The AVA-202's wing has an area of 10.87 m^{2} (117.0 sq ft) and is equipped with flaps. The standard engine fitted is the 160 hp (119 kW) Lycoming AEIO-320-B2B four-stroke aerobatic powerplant.

== Specifications ==
Data from Jane's All The World's Aircraft 2003–2004

General characteristics

- Crew: one
- Capacity: one passenger
- Length: 6.02 m (19 ft 9 in)
- Wingspan: 8.74 m (28 ft 8 in)
- Height: 2.04 m (6 ft 8 in)
- Wing area: 10.87 m^{2} (117.0 sq ft)
- Aspect ratio: 7.0:0
- Airfoil: NACA 63_{2}-215
- Empty weight: 500 kg (1,102 lb)
- Max takeoff weight: 750 kg (1,653 lb)
- Powerplant: 1 × Textron Lycoming AEIO-320-B2B air-cooled flat-four, 120 kW (160 hp)

Performance

- Maximum speed: 259 km/h (161 mph, 140 kn) at sea level
- Cruise speed: 250 km/h (160 mph, 130 kn) (75% power)
- Stall speed: 84 km/h (52 mph, 45 kn) (flaps down)
- Range: 1,000 km (620 mi, 540 nmi)
- Service ceiling: 6,400 m (21,000 ft)
- Rate of climb: 7.6 m/s (1,500 ft/min)

== See also ==
- Iran Aviation Industries Organization
