= Van's Aircraft RV-6 =

American kit aircraft

RV-6
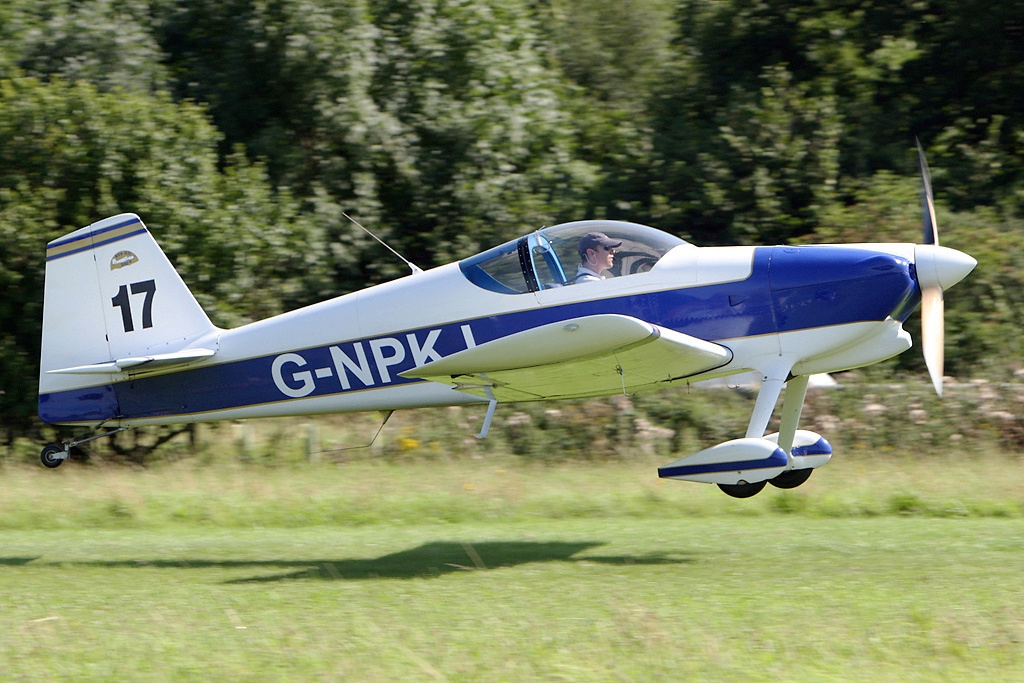

General information
- Type: Kit aircraft
- National origin: United States
- Manufacturer: Van's Aircraft
- Designer: Richard VanGrunsven
- Status: No longer sold
- Number built: 2706 (November 2022)

History
- First flight: 1985
- Developed from: Van's Aircraft RV-4
- Variant: Aviation Industries of Iran AVA-202
- Developed into: Van's Aircraft RV-7

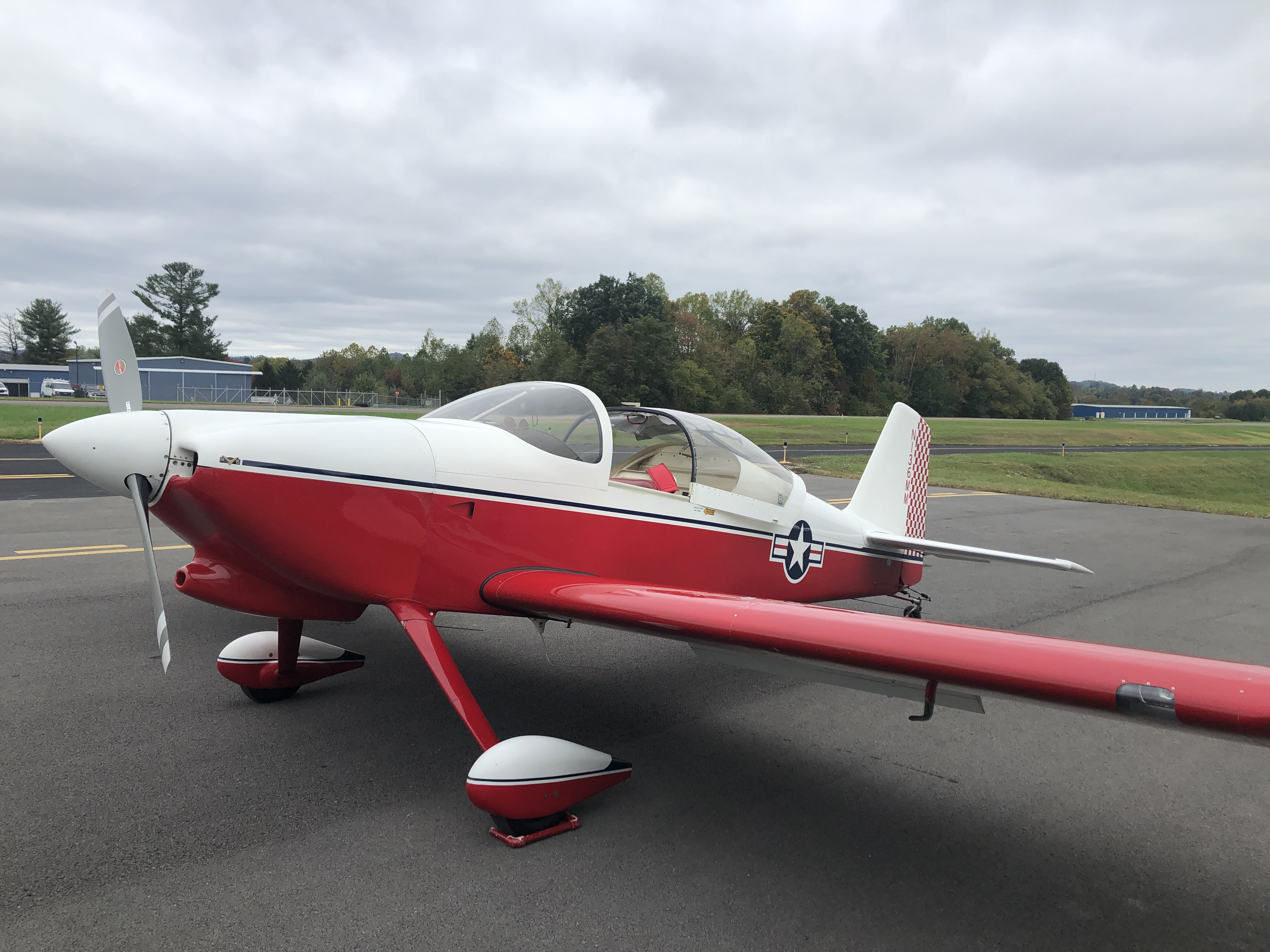
A Vans RV-6 with a sliding canopy and Vans Air Force paint scheme.

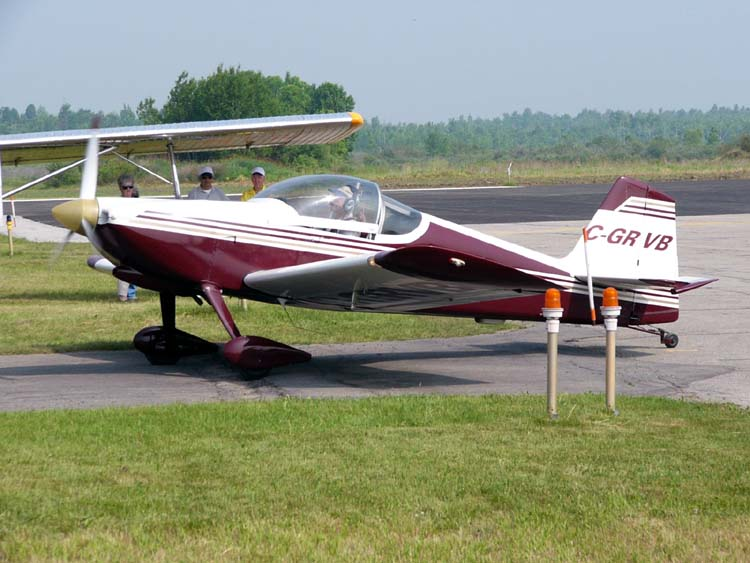
A RV-6 taxiing at the Brockville Ontario fly-in June 2005. This aircraft has the earlier design forward-hinged canopy

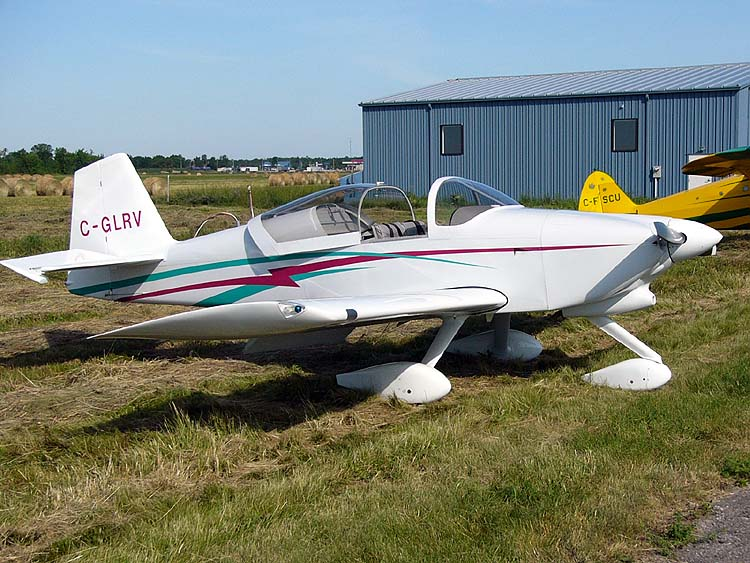
A RV-6A – the nose wheel equipped version of the RV-6. This aircraft has the later sliding canopy.

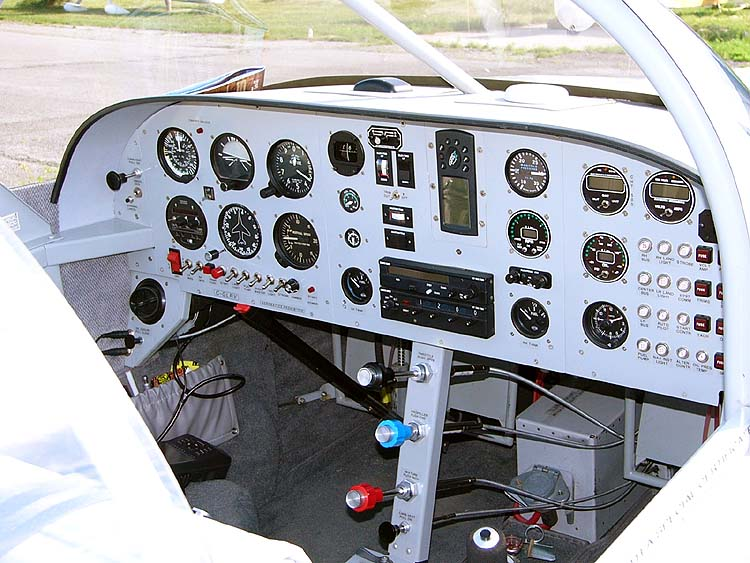
A RV-6 instrument panel showing typical instruments and avionics found in these aircraft

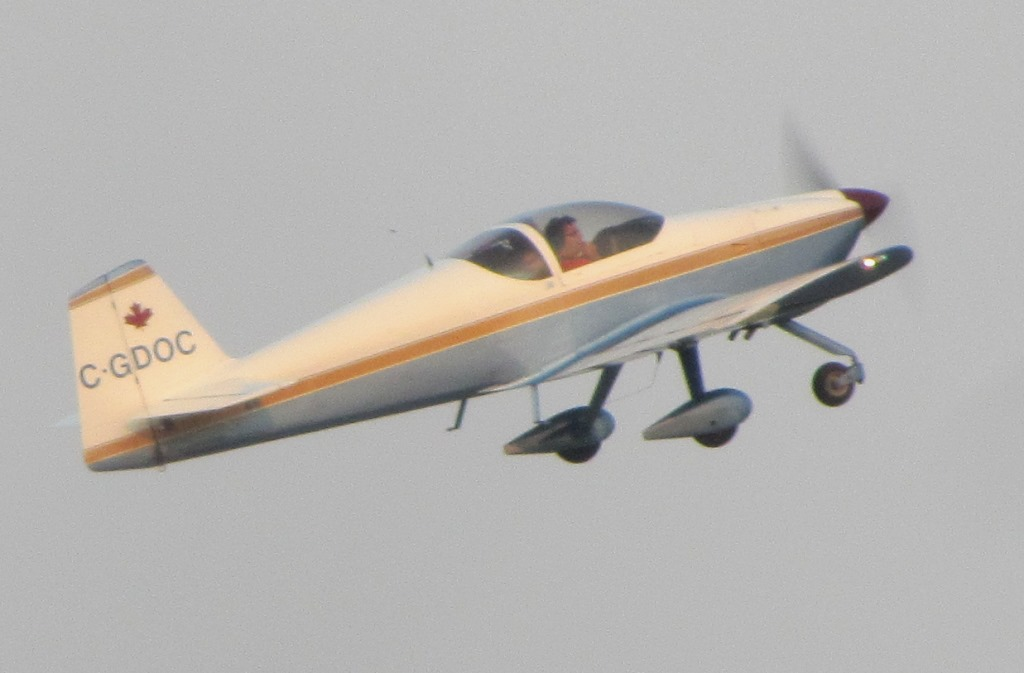
Vans RV-6A takeoff

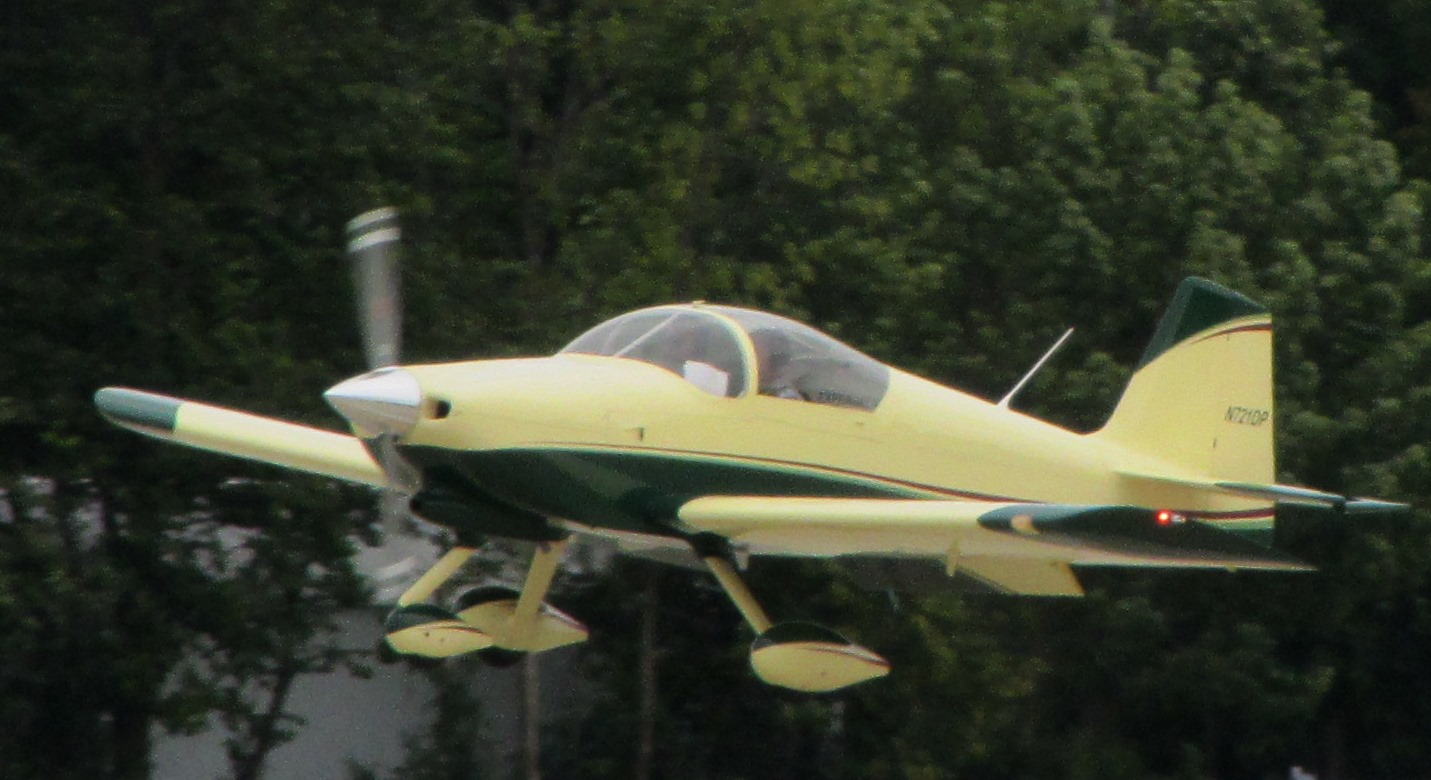
Van's RV-6A landing

The Van's RV-6 and RV-6A are two-seat, single-engine, low-wing homebuilt airplanes sold in kit form by Van's Aircraft. The RV-6 is the tail-wheel equipped version while the RV-6A features a nose-wheel. The RV-6 was the first aircraft in the popular Van's RV series to feature side-by-side seating and the first to offer a nosewheel option. It was first flown in 1985. Over 2700 kits have been completed and flown.

The RV-6 and RV-6A were replaced by the similar, but improved, RV-7 in 2001. Kit components are still available to allow builders to complete RV-6s under construction, but no new complete kits are available.

== Development ==
Van's Aircraft designer, Richard VanGrunsven, designed the RV-6 series as a two-seat side-by-side development of the RV-4, which was itself a development of the single seat RV-3.

Market demand motivated VanGrunsven to design the RV-6 and offer it as an optional nosewheel design. The original two seater RV-4 has been a remarkable success, but the tandem seating configuration was not considered ideal by many potential owners as it leaves the passenger isolated in the back seat. Many spouses of builders especially favoured the side-by-side configuration over the tandem arrangement.

VanGrunsven worked diligently to create a side-by-side design with a generous 43-inch-wide (1,100 mm) cockpit that did not sacrifice the RV-4's handling, STOL performance and especially its high cruise speed. In the end the RV-6 prototype produced cruise speeds that are only 3 mph (5 km/h) slower than the RV-4 with the same engine.

The first RV-6s had a forward hinged canopy design. This was a simple one-piece arrangement, but it made taxiing the aircraft with the canopy open more difficult. Later kits had the option of a rearward sliding canopy that could more easily provide ventilation on the ground. One RV-6A was modified for open cockpit flight with an enclosed rear turtledeck.

The RV-6A version features steel rod landing gear with the nosewheel strut attached to the engine mount. The nosewheel is friction castering and the aircraft is steered with differential braking. The brakes are mounted conventionally on the rudder pedal toes.

== Nigerian Air Force RV-6A Air Beetle ==
The RV-6 is also used as a military training aircraft. The Nigerian government's Aeronautical Industrial Engineering Project (AIEP) searched for a suitable trainer that could be assembled in Nigeria using local labor and selected the RV-6A. Three prototypes were constructed as a proof of concept using a combination of consultants (Peter Lewis from the USA and John Cook from Great Britain) and local labor, subsequently EXP-1 was the first Aircraft to have been assembled and flown in Nigeria. Van's produced 60 kits to fulfill the order and these were assembled, and test flown in Nigeria, entering service with the Nigerian Air Force in 1989 as elementary training aircraft under the name "Air Beetle". The air training school is based at Kaduna, Nigeria. The only other amateur aircraft to have this distinction is the Pazmany PL-1, which was built as a trainer for Taiwan's Air Force in the 1970s. The RV-6A Air Beetle T.18, as it was designated in Nigerian service, appears to have been out of service by 2010. Though there were some efforts to return some of the aircraft to service in 2010, they do not appear to have gone anywhere. At least one aircraft was lost in an accident, killing its pilot.

== AVA-202 ==
A modified version of the RV-6A is manufactured in Iran by Aviation Industries of Iran as the AVA-202. First flown in 1997, the main change from the RV-6A is a greater wingspan of 28.67 ft (8.74 m).

== Operators ==
Nigeria

- Nigerian Air Force (RV-6A)

== Specifications (RV-6 180 hp) ==
Data from Van's website

General characteristics

- Crew: one
- Capacity: one passenger
- Length: 20 ft 2 in (6.15 m)
- Wingspan: 23 ft 0 in (7.01 m)
- Height: 5 ft 3 in (1.60 m)
- Wing area: 110 sq ft (10 m^{2})
- Aspect ratio: 4.81
- Empty weight: 965 lb (438 kg)
- Gross weight: 1,600 lb (726 kg)
- Fuel capacity: 38 U.S. gallons (140 L; 32 imp gal)
- Powerplant: 1 × Lycoming O-360 four cylinder, four-stroke, air-cooled, horizontally-opposed aircraft engine, 180 hp (130 kW)

Performance

- Maximum speed: 210 mph (340 km/h, 180 kn)
- Cruise speed: 199 mph (320 km/h, 173 kn)
- Stall speed: 49 mph (79 km/h, 43 kn)
- Range: 720 mi (1,160 km, 630 nmi) at 75% and 8000 feet
- Service ceiling: 25,700 ft (7,800 m)
- Rate of climb: 2,275 ft/min (11.56 m/s)
- Wing loading: 14.55 lb/sq ft (71.0 kg/m^{2})
- Power/mass: 0.1125

== See also ==
Related development

- Van's Aircraft RV-4
- Van's Aircraft RV-7

Aircraft of comparable role, configuration, and era

- Aircraft Technologies Atlantis
- Europa XS
- Grumman American AA-1
- Rand Robinson KR-1
- Thorp T-18
- Pazmany PL-1
