= Van's Aircraft RV-3 =

American kit aircraft

RV-3
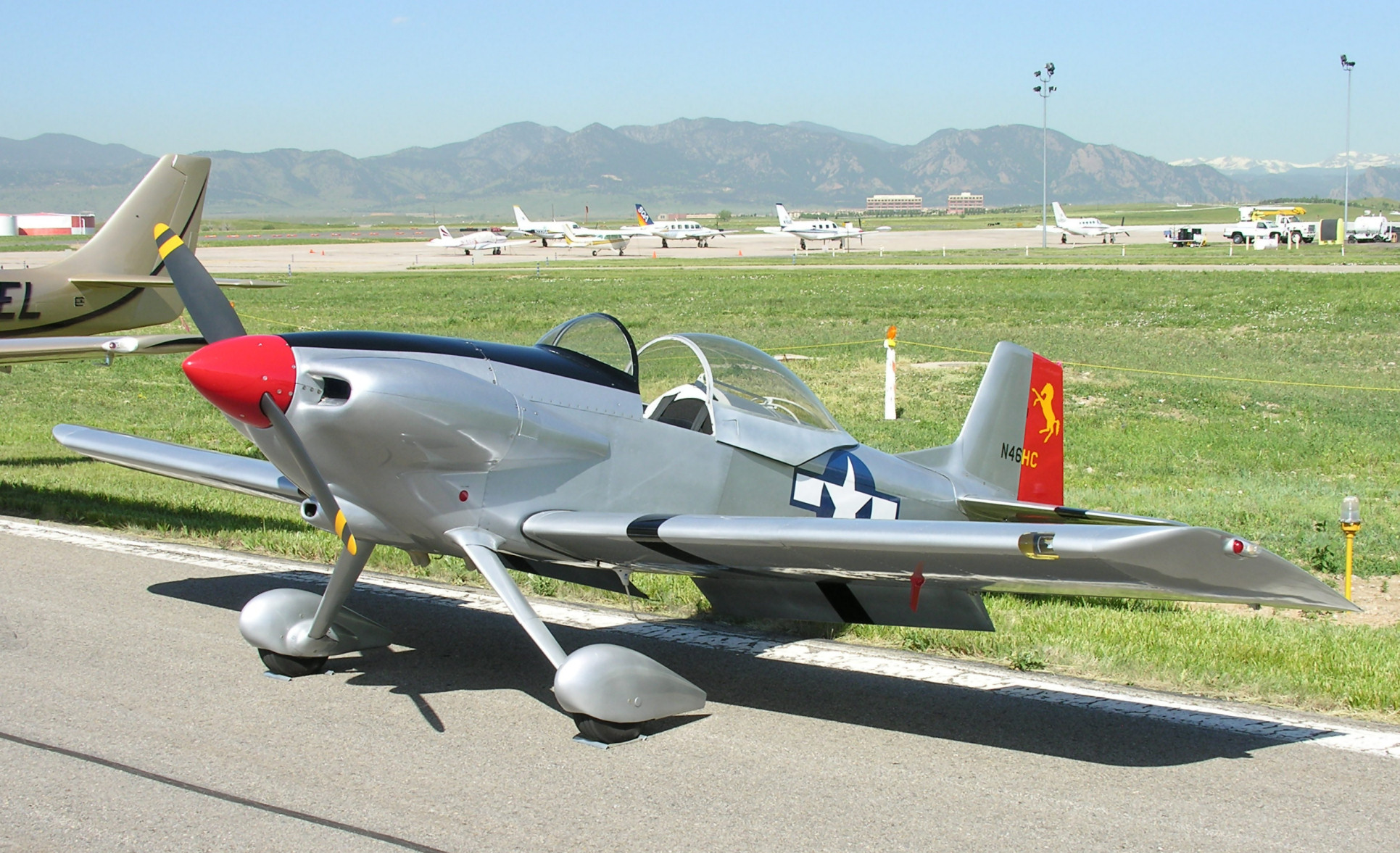

General information
- Type: Kit aircraft
- National origin: United States
- Manufacturer: Van's Aircraft
- Designer: Richard VanGrunsven
- Status: RV-3: Production completed RV-3B: In production
- Number built: 305 (February 2023)

History
- Introduction date: 1971
- Developed from: Stits Playboy
- Developed into: Van's Aircraft RV-4

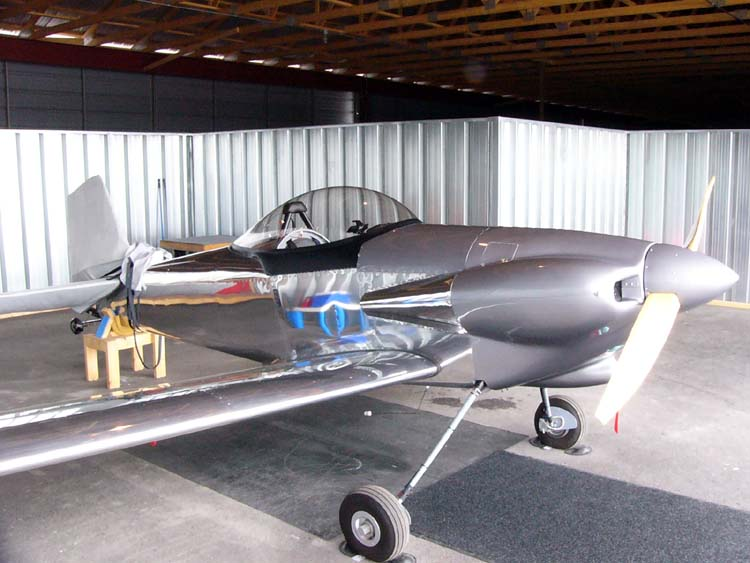
RV-3

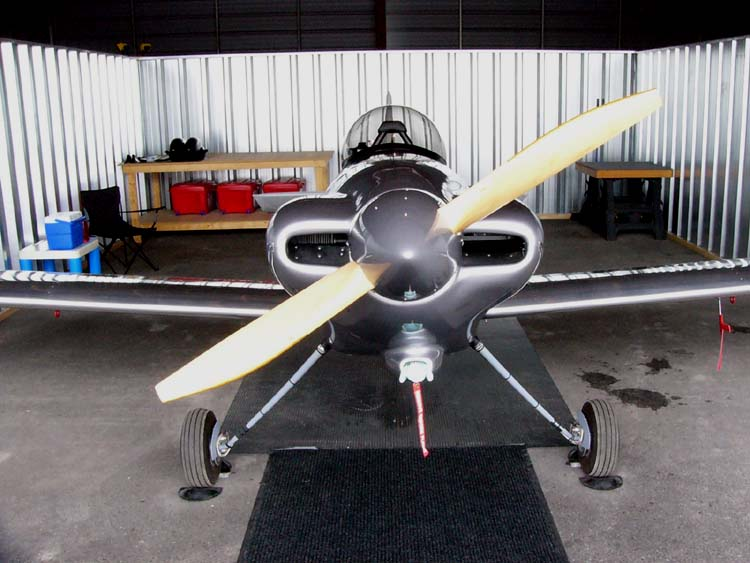
Van's Aircraft RV-3, showing the design's low frontal area

The Van's RV-3 is a single-seat, single-engine, low-wing kit aircraft sold by Van's Aircraft. Unlike many other aircraft in the RV line, the RV-3 is only available as a tail-wheel equipped aircraft, although it is possible that some may have been completed by builders as nose-wheel versions. The RV-3 is the genesis design for the rest of the RV series, all which strongly resemble the RV-3. The RV-4 was originally developed as a two-seat RV-3.

== Development ==
The architect of the line of Van's aircraft, Richard VanGrunsven, designed the RV-3 in the late 1960s after experience flying the Stits Playboy amateur-built aircraft. The RV-3 started out as an attempt to maintain the Playboy's layout and concept but to improve it in every regard. The RV-3 was designed to have light handling, aerobatic capabilities, fast cruise speeds, and short field STOL capabilities. The RV-3 was also designed from the start for serious travel and as such carries 30 US gallons of fuel, giving it a range of about 600 statute miles. The design horsepower is 100–150, typically using a Lycoming O-235 or Lycoming O-320 powerplant. Some builders have fitted RV-3s with more powerful engines, however.

The RV-3 uses a NACA 23012 airfoil on a constant chord wing. Construction is semi-monocoque of predominantly 2024-T3 aluminum sheet. The wings are built around an aluminum I-beam spar with a lighter rear spar. The aircraft has plain flaps operated by a handle. The main landing gear is attached directly to the welded steel engine mount and consists of tapered, sprung steel rods. Construction time for the RV-3 is reported to be 1300 hours for a first time builder.

The very first RV-3 built by VanGrunsven won "Best Aerodynamic Detailing" at the 1972 EAA Oshkosh Convention. It also won the 1973 AC/EAA Efficiency Contest.

There is an RV-3A model, but its designation does not follow VanGrunsven's normal system, where "A" models are nosewheel equipped versions. An RV-3A is an early RV-3 that has undergone rear spar and wing root upgrades as described in Van's publication CN-1. Due to ongoing structural concerns, the production of RV-3 kits was suspended in 1996. Continued customer demand for the single seat design resulted in VanGrunsven engineering a new wing for the RV-3. Production of kits was restarted a few years later. New aircraft completed since the wing redesign and aircraft that have been retrofitted with the new wing are referred to as an RV-3B.

By February 2023, 305 RV-3s had been completed and flown.

== Aircraft on display ==
- EAA AirVenture Museum – RV-3 Prototype N17RV

== Specifications (RV-3B) ==
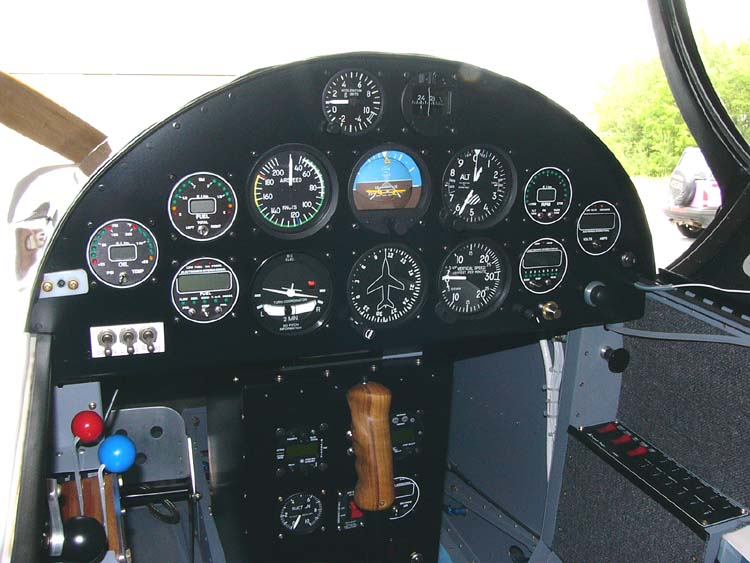
Van's Aircraft RV-3 instrument panel

Data from Manufacturer

General characteristics

- Crew: one pilot
- Capacity: no passengers
- Length: 19 ft 0 in (5.79 m)
- Wingspan: 19 ft 11 in (6.07 m)
- Height: 5 ft 0 in (1.52 m)
- Wing area: 90 sq ft (8.4 m^{2})
- Empty weight: 750 lb (340 kg)
- Gross weight: 1,100 lb (499 kg)
- Max takeoff weight: 1,100 lb (499 kg)
- Fuel capacity: 30 US gal (110 L; 25 imp gal)
- Powerplant: 1 × Lycoming O-320 fixed pitch, 150 hp (110 kW)

Performance

- Maximum speed: 207 mph (333 km/h, 180 kn) at sea level
- Cruise speed: 196 mph (315 km/h, 170 kn) 75% power at 8,000 ft (2,500 m)
- Stall speed: 51 mph (82 km/h, 44 kn)
- Range: 595 mi (958 km, 517 nmi) at cruise 75% power at 8,000 ft (2,500 m)
- Service ceiling: 23,500 ft (7,200 m)
- Rate of climb: 2,050 ft/min (10.4 m/s)
- Wing loading: 12.22 lb/sq ft (59.7 kg/m^{2})
- Power/mass: 7.3 lb/hp

== See also ==
Related development

- Van's Aircraft RV-4
- Van's Aircraft RV-6

Aircraft of comparable role, configuration, and era

- Aircraft Technologies Acro 1
- Mustang Aeronautics Mustang II
- Rand Robinson KR-1
- Stits Playboy
