= Rihn DR-107 "One Design" =

American homebuilt aerobatic aircraft

DR-107 "One Design"
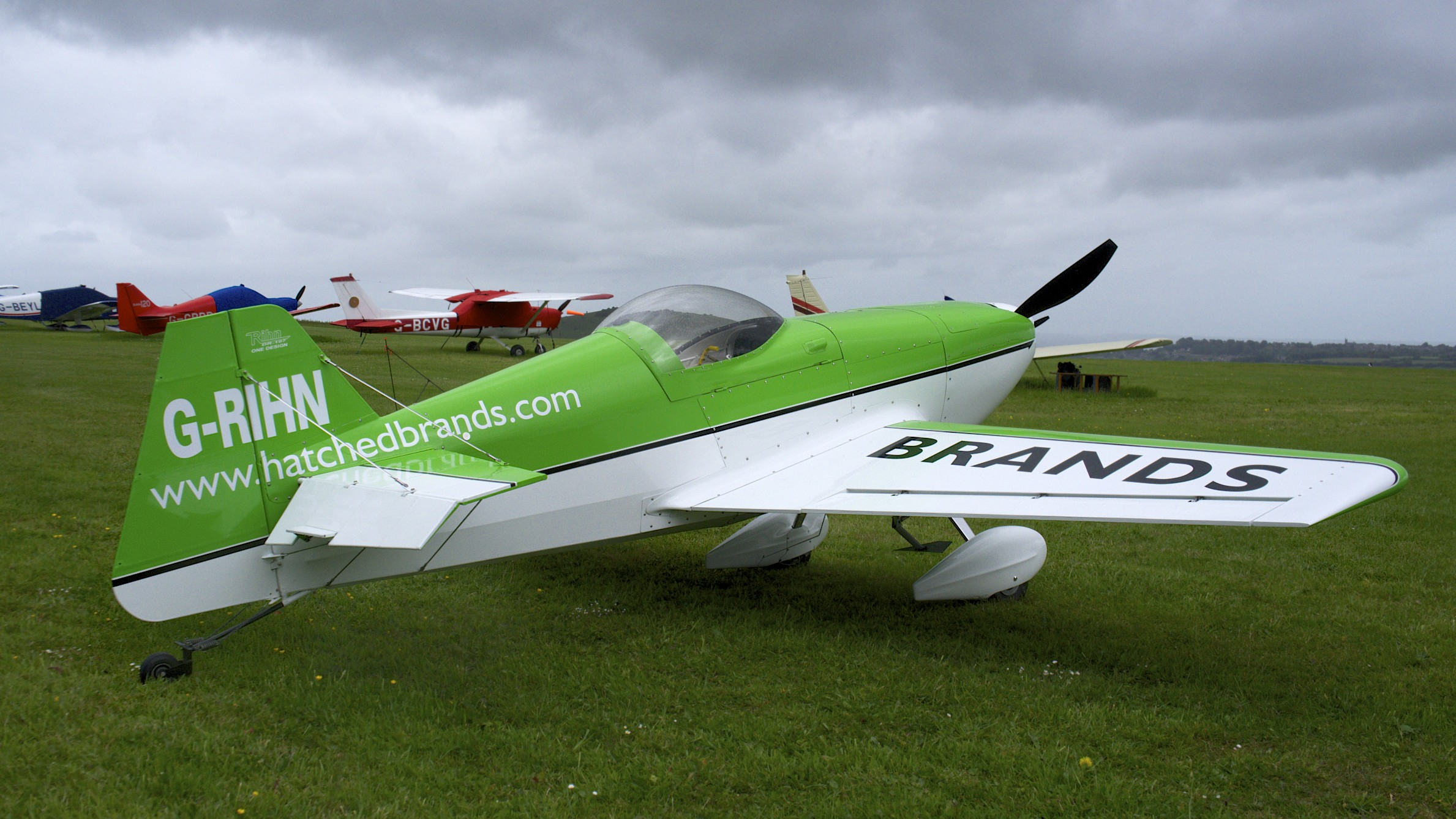
- DR-107 at Compton Abbas Airfield

General information
- Type: Homebuilt aircraft
- National origin: United States
- Manufacturer: Aircraft Spruce & Specialty
- Designer: Dan Rihn
- Status: Plans and kits available (2013)
- Number built: at least 56 (2013)

History
- First flight: 1993
- Variant: Rihn DR-109

The Rihn DR-107 "One Design" is an American aerobatic homebuilt aircraft that was designed by Dan Rihn and first flown in 1993. The aircraft is supplied by Aircraft Spruce & Specialty of Corona, California in the form of plans and a materials kit for amateur construction.

The DR-107 was designed as a low-cost one design aircraft for competition and sport basic to advanced aerobatics, including International Aerobatic Club Class One competitions. For this role it is stressed to +/-10g.

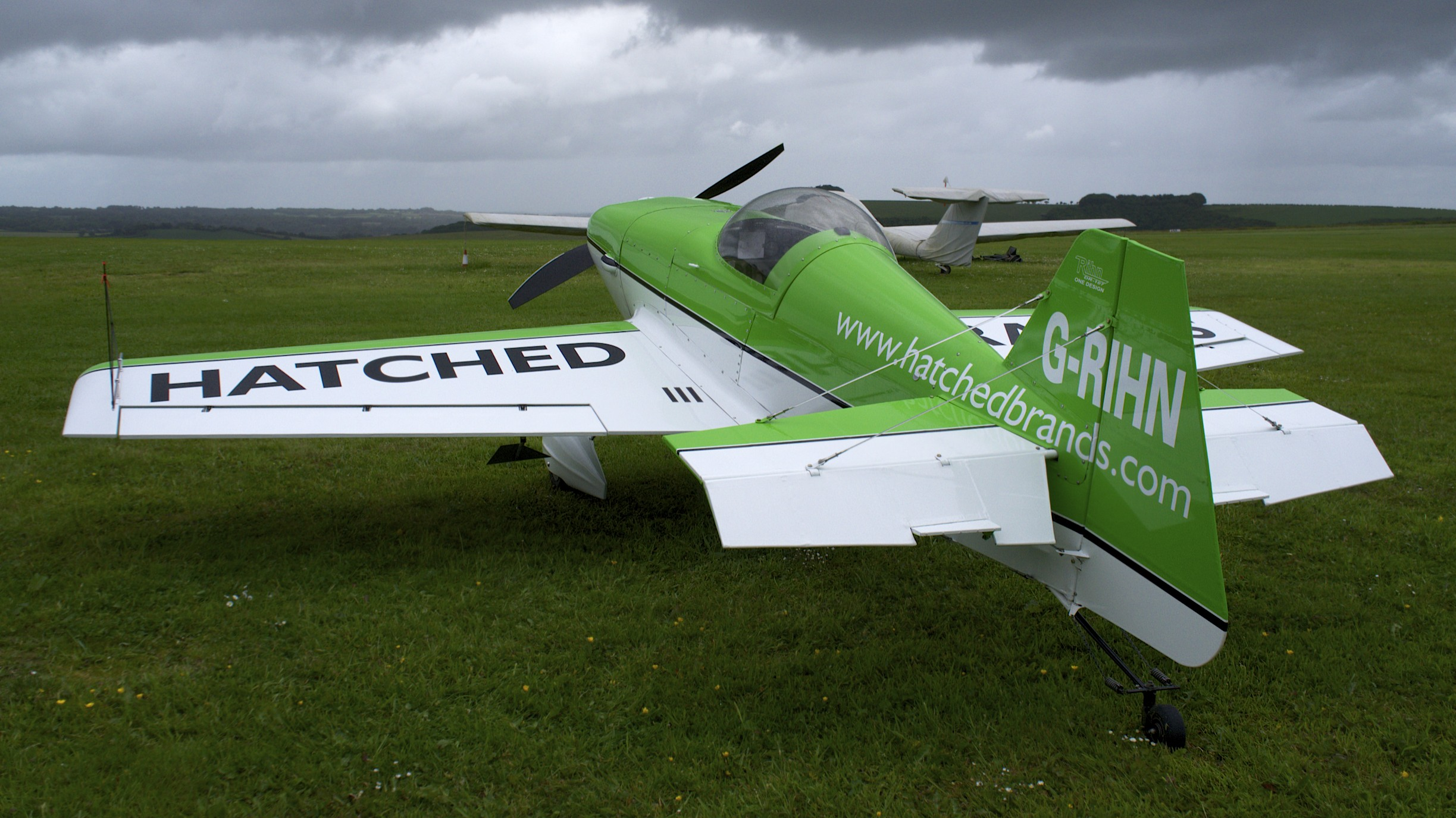
DR-107 "One Design"

== Design and development ==
The DR-107 is a monoplane that features a cantilever low-wing, a single-seat enclosed cockpit under a bubble canopy, fixed conventional landing gear with wheel pants and a single engine in tractor configuration.

The aircraft is predominantly made from wood, with some steel parts and doped aircraft fabric. Its 19.50 ft (5.9 m) span wing employs a Wainfan 16% symmetrical airfoil and has a wing area of 75.55 sq ft (7.019 m^{2}). The wing has almost full-span ailerons that produce rolls of 360° per second. The wing has no flaps. Other features include a low-mounted cable-braced tailplane and a 24 in (61.0 cm) wide cockpit.

The DR-107 can accept engines of 160 to 180 hp (119 to 134 kW). The standard engines used are the 180 hp (134 kW) Lycoming O-360, modified with high compression pistons, an inverted oil system and fuel injection or the 160 hp (119 kW) Lycoming AEIO-320 powerplant.The aircraft has an empty weight of 740 lb (340 kg) and a gross weight of 1,150 lb (520 kg), giving a useful load of 410 lb (190 kg). With full fuel of 19 U.S. gallons (72 L; 16 imp gal) the payload is 296 lb (134 kg).

The designer estimates the construction time from the supplied materials kit as 2000 hours.

== Operational history ==
By 1998 the company reported that 355 kits had been sold and five aircraft were flying.

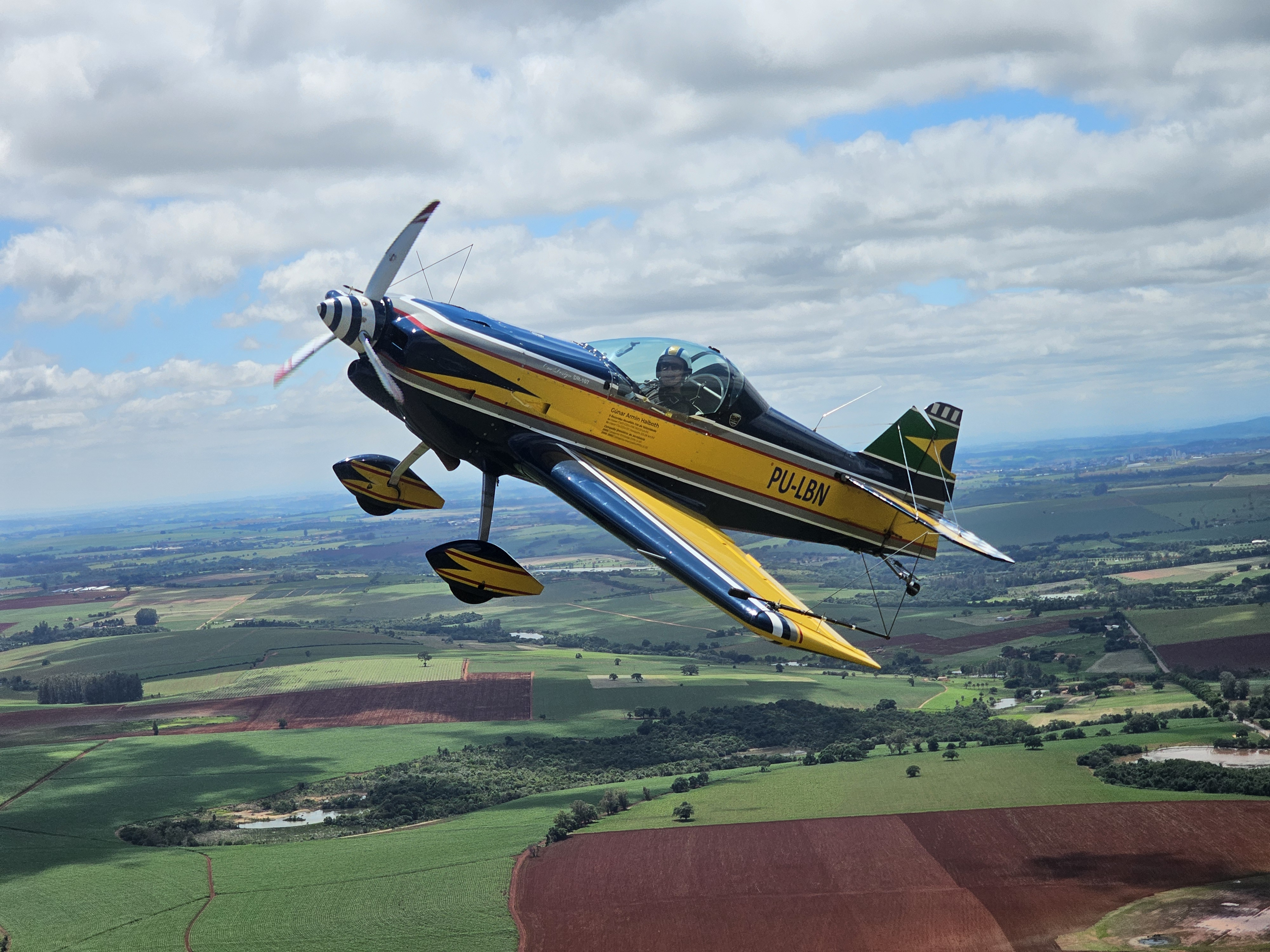
DR-107 "One Design" flying in Brazil

In November 2013 33 examples were registered in the United States with the Federal Aviation Administration, with another 11 previously registered and now removed. Also in November 2013 there were two registered with Transport Canada and ten in the United Kingdom with the Civil Aviation Authority. By August 2024, ten were registered in Australia with the Civil Aviation Safety Authority (including nine recorded as DR-107 One Design and one recorded as One Design); it is unknown how many are registered with Recreational Aviation Australia. As of April 2026 there are three registered in Brazil and one in Argentina as LV-X326.

== See also ==
- List of aerobatic aircraft
