= Van's Aircraft RV-4 =

American kit aircraft

RV-4
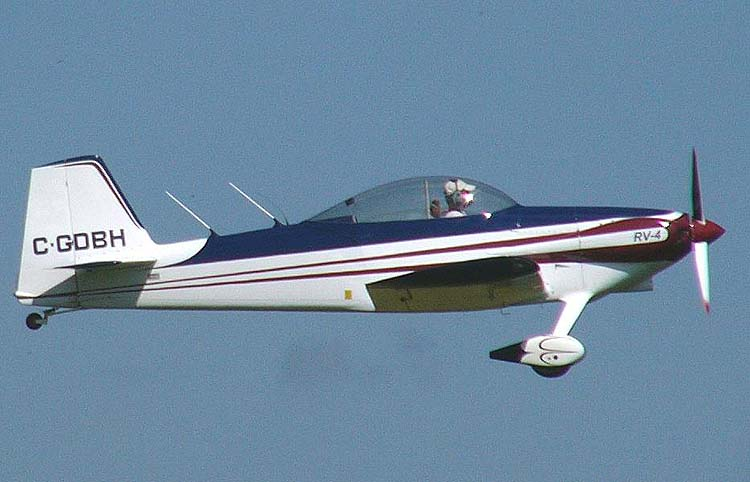

General information
- Type: RV-4
- National origin: United States
- Manufacturer: Van's Aircraft
- Designer: Richard VanGrunsven
- Number built: 1446 (November 2022)

History
- Introduction date: 1980
- First flight: August 1979
- Developed from: Van's Aircraft RV-3
- Developed into: Van's Aircraft RV-8

The Van's RV-4 is an American light homebuilt aircraft supplied in kit form by Van's Aircraft of Aurora, Oregon. It seats two people in a tandem seating configuration with the pilot accommodated in the front seat.

The Van's RV series has become the most popular kit-built aircraft in the world. As of April 2019, the RV-4 is the fourth most popular RV model.

As of November 2022, 1446 RV-4s had been completed and flown worldwide.

== Development ==
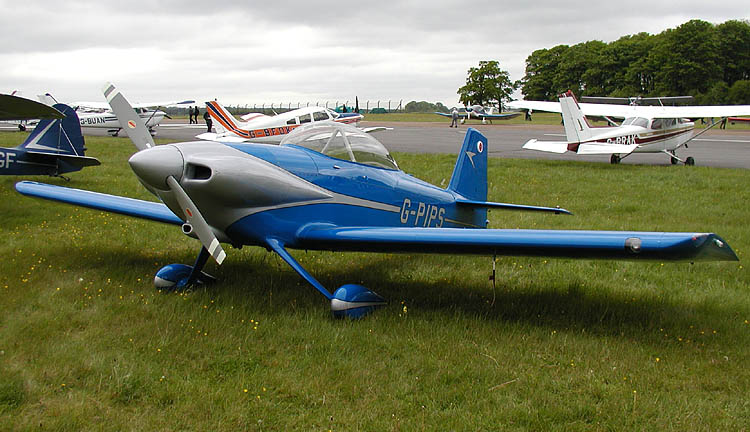
Van's Aircraft RV-4 at Kemble Airfield, England.

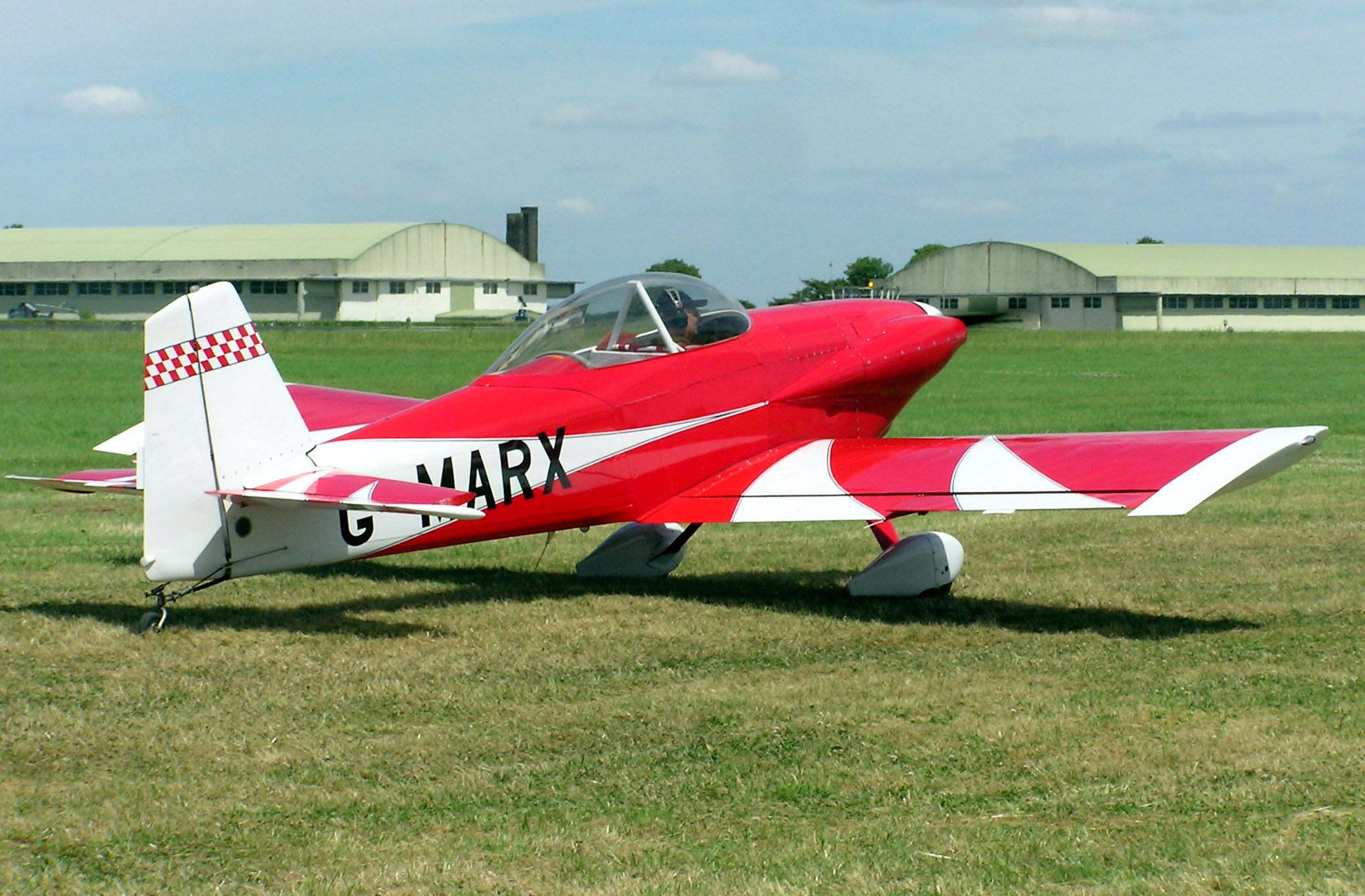
Van's Aircraft RV-4

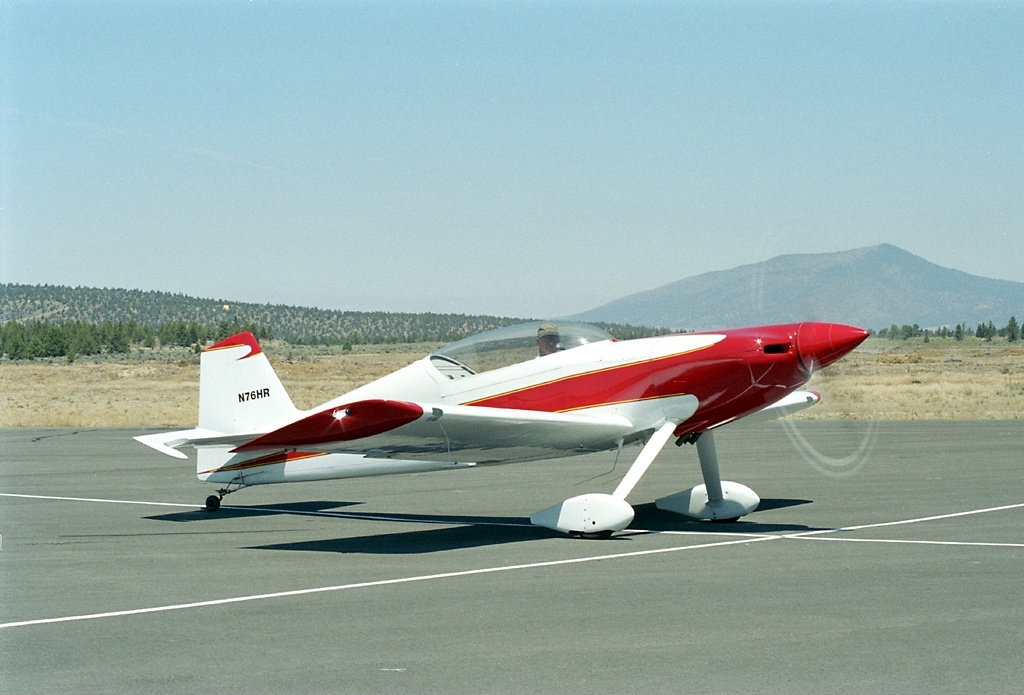
Harmon Rocket II

Richard VanGrunsven designed the RV-4 in the mid 1970s as a two-seat development of the single-seat RV-3. The RV-4 prototype first flew in August 1979.

The RV-4 is a new design based upon the concepts proven in the RV-3 and is not merely a stretched RV-3. The RV-4 airframe will accept a range of engines up to 180 hp (134 kW), including the Lycoming O-360. The RV-4 has a new wing, with increased wingspan and wing area over the RV-3. The RV-4 is designed for sport aerobatics.

The RV-4 has proven to be a capable cross country aircraft in service, able to carry two modest sized people and baggage on longer trips. RV-4s have been flown around the world, notably by an Australian, Jon Johanson, who completed world-girdling RV-4 flights on two occasions.

Many larger people find the RV-4 cockpit design physically constraining, and as a result VanGrunsven has designed an entire family of derivative designs. The RV-6 was designed to allow side-by-side seating, and the RV-8 was created as an enlarged aircraft that follows the RV-4's philosophy and offers tandem seating in a bigger aircraft.

Unlike most later RV series designs, RV-4 kits are only available with conventional landing gear, although some may have been constructed in tricycle configuration by builders. At least two RV-4s have also been built with retractable landing gear (mostly for the engineering challenge, as the performance gains were modest).

== Variants ==
RV-4
Basic version
Harmon Rocket II
Higher performance derivative of the RV4, with clipped wings, a 300 hp (224 kW) Lycoming IO-540 engine and a razorback turtledeck.

== Specifications (Typical RV-4) ==
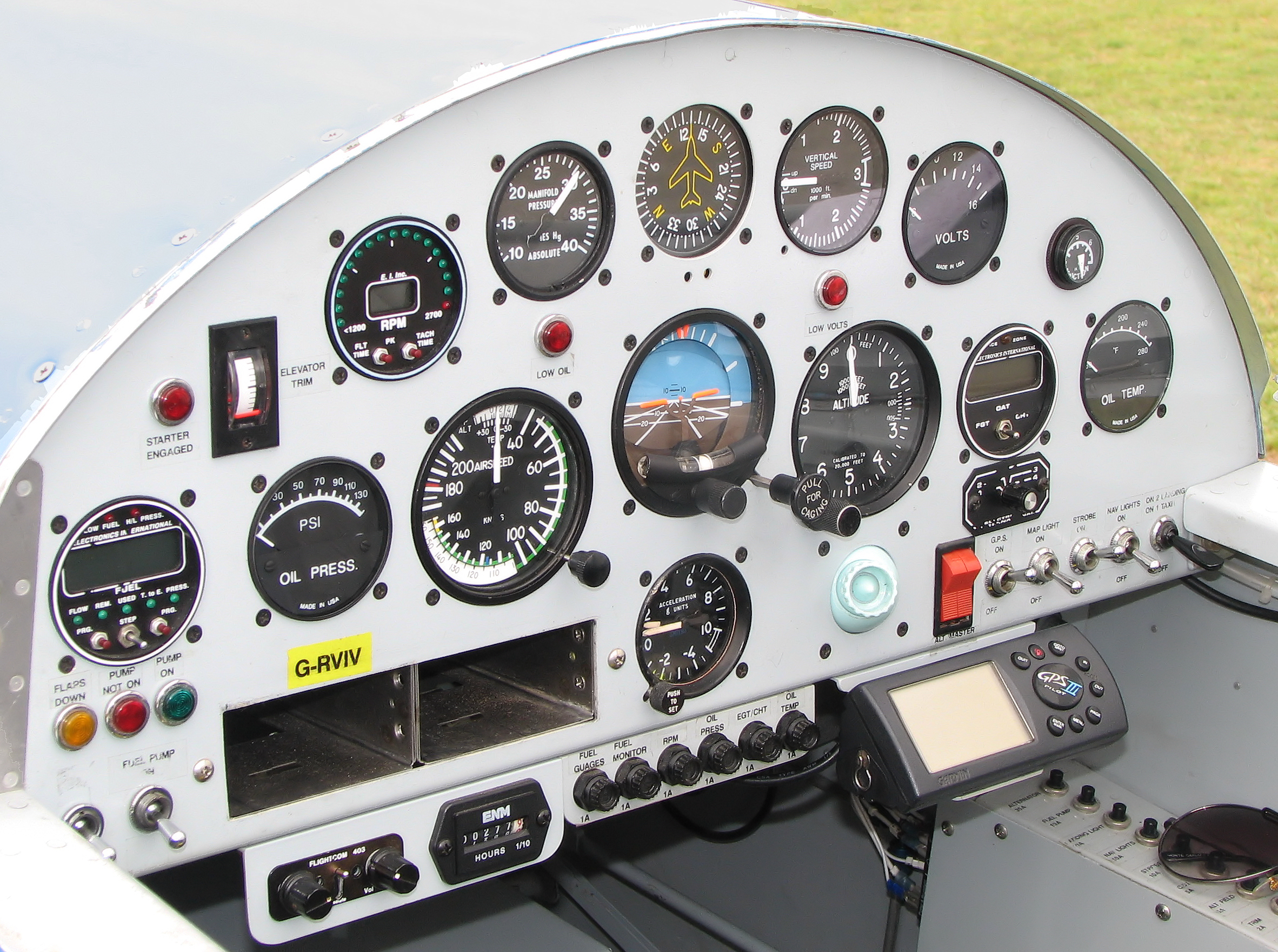
Cockpit of an RV-4 in 2006.

Data from manufacturer

General characteristics

- Length: 20 ft 4 in (6.20 m)
- Wingspan: 23 ft (7.0 m)
- Height: 5 ft 5 in (1.65 m)
- Wing area: 110 sq ft (10 m^{2})
- Empty weight: 903 lb (410 kg) minimum
- Gross weight: 1,500 lb (680 kg)
- Fuel capacity: 32 U.S. gallons (120 L; 27 imp gal)
- Powerplant: 1 × Lycoming O-360 four cylinder piston aircraft engine, 180 hp (130 kW)
- Propellers: 2-bladed fixed pitch or constant speed propeller

Performance

- Maximum speed: 212 mph (341 km/h, 184 kn)
- Cruise speed: 200 mph (320 km/h, 170 kn) 75% power at 8,000 ft
- Stall speed: 54 mph (87 km/h, 47 kn)
- Range: 590 mi (950 km, 510 nmi)
- Service ceiling: 23,000 ft (7,000 m)
- Rate of climb: 1,950 ft/min (9.9 m/s)
- Wing loading: 13.64 lb/sq ft (66.6 kg/m^{2})
- Power/mass: 8.33 lb/hp

== See also ==
Related development

- Van's Aircraft RV-3
- Van's Aircraft RV-6
- Van's Aircraft RV-8

Aircraft of comparable role, configuration, and era

- Europa XS
- Team Rocket F1 Rocket
- Thorp T-18
