= Rand Robinson KR-1 =

KR-1 and KR-2
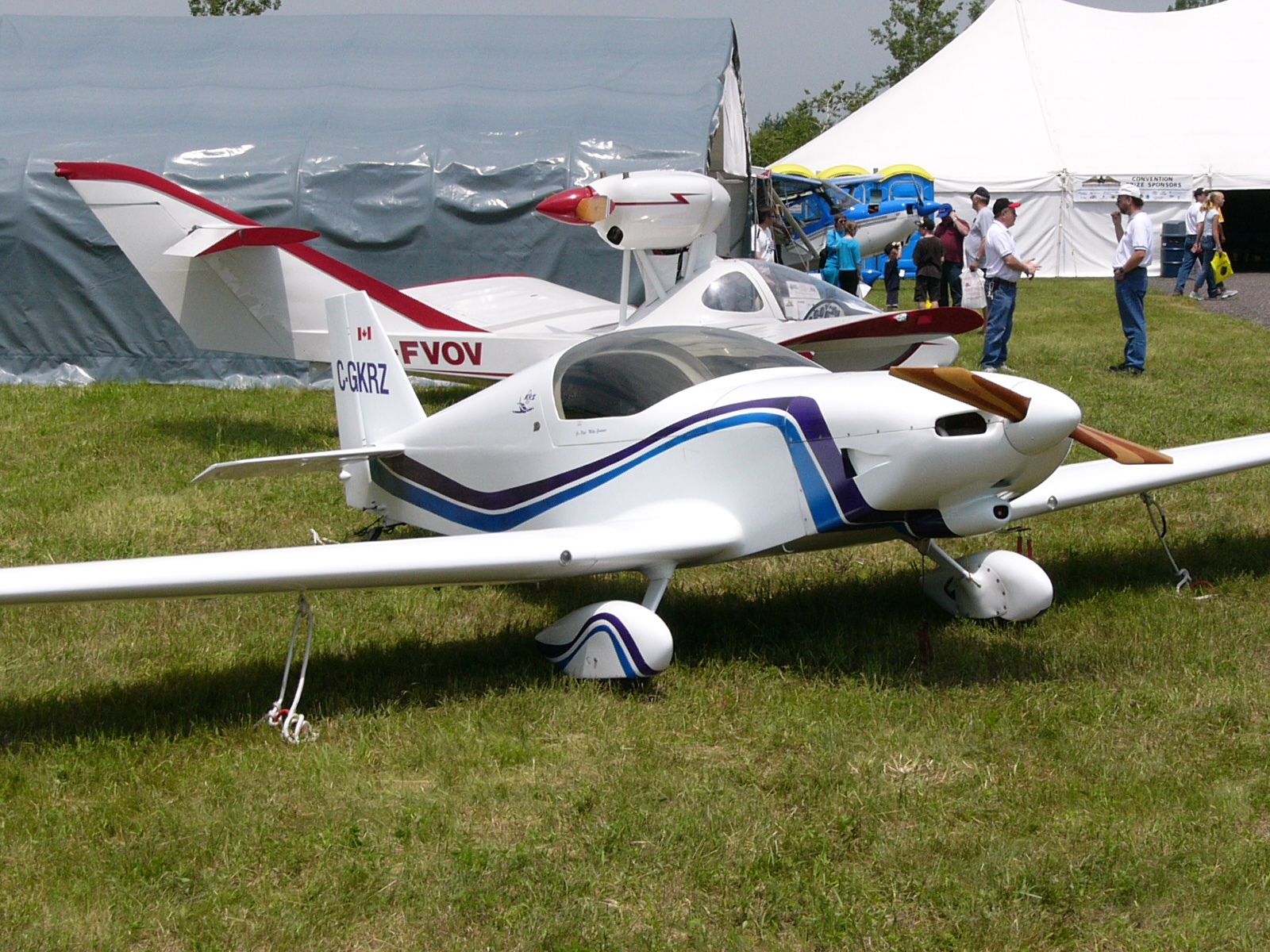
- KR-2S

General information
- Type: Homebuilt
- National origin: United States
- Manufacturer: nVAero
- Designer: Kenneth Rand
- Status: In production (2022)

History
- First flight: February 1972

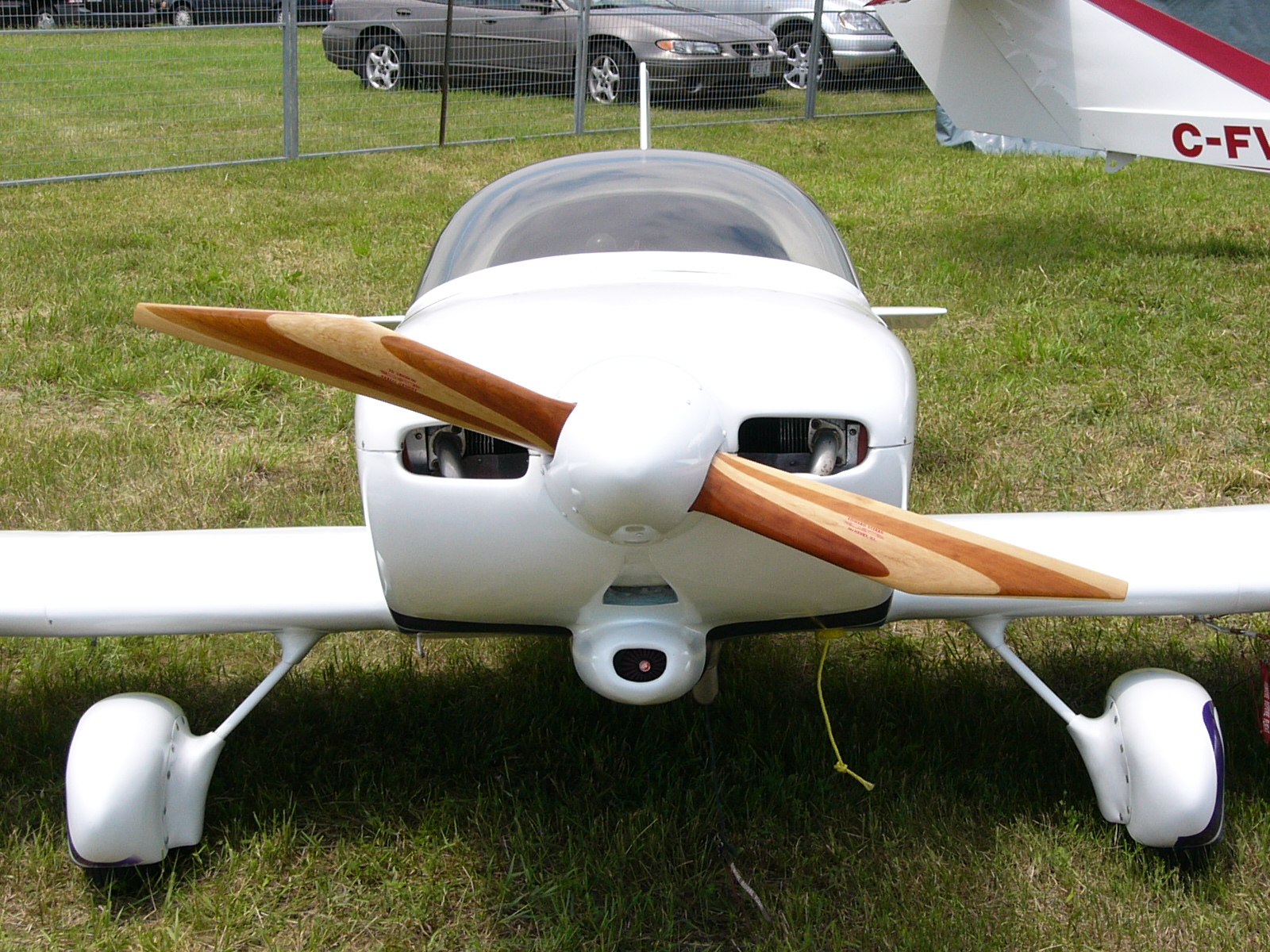
A KR-2S showing the small size of the aircraft and the low frontal profile

The Rand Robinson KR-1 is a single-seat, single-engine sport aircraft designed in the United States in the early 1970s and marketed for homebuilding. A two-seat version is marketed as the KR-2. It is a low-wing cantilever monoplane of conventional design with an enclosed cockpit and tailwheel undercarriage. As originally designed, the main undercarriage units of the KR-1 and basic KR-2 were manually retractable, folding backwards into the wings, while the KR-2T tandem-seat version had fixed tricycle undercarriage. However, some builders choose fixed tailwheel or even fixed tricycle undercarriage for KR-1s and KR-2s.

Kits for the KR-1, KR-2 and KR-2S are supplied by nVAero of Mission Viejo, California/Corona, California, United States.

== Design and development ==
The KR-1's wings have a two-spar construction; the front spar of spruce, and the rear spar from spruce and plywood. The wing ribs are formed from polyurethane foam, and the space around them filled with the same material before the entire wing structure is covered with fabric impregnated with epoxy resin. Similar construction is used in the KR-2, with an RAF 48 airfoil cross-section (some later models have adapted the AS 5046 airfoil, for increased speed at the expense of poorer low-speed handling), and the wings are removable outboard the landing gear. Similar construction is used in the empennage and control surfaces.

The fuselage is built around a wooden framework, the lower part skinned in plywood and the upper part built up of polystyrene foam covered in epoxy-coated fabric. KR-1 builders have the choice of three different upper fuselage configurations: the "fastback" with a turtledeck behind the cockpit, the "pursuit" with a fighter-style bubble canopy, and the "sportsman" with an open cockpit and a small fairing behind it for rollover protection.

The design has proved popular, with over 10,000 sets of plans sold, including 6,000 sets of KR-1 plans and 4,500 sets of KR-2 plans sold by 1979. From these, over 200 KR-1s and 350 KR-2s were flying by 1987. nVAero's founder Steve Glover reported in 2010 that over 2,000 KRs were flying, worldwide.

Plans and kits were still available in 2022.

== Variants ==
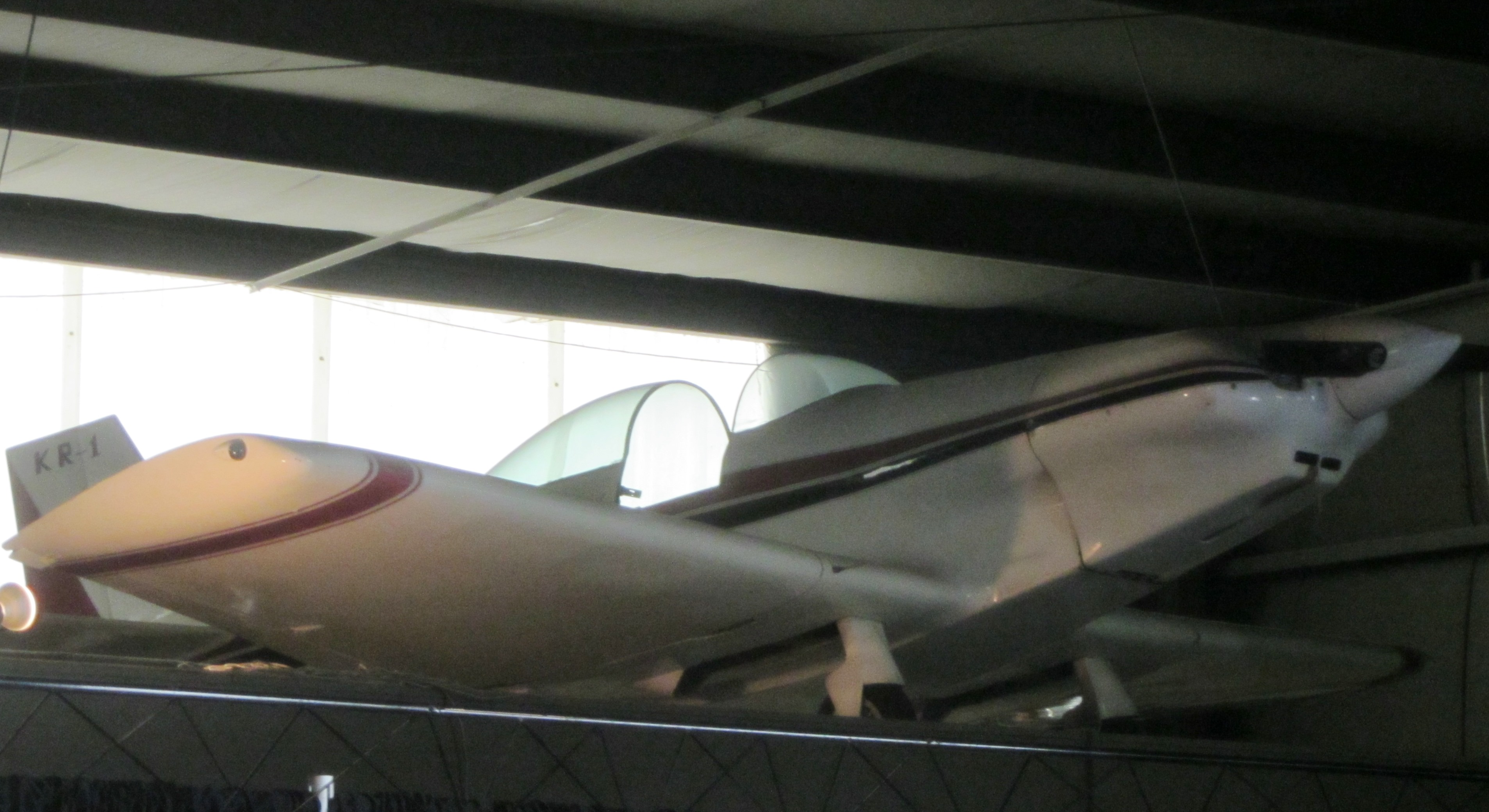
Rand Robinson KR-1 on display

- KR-1 - original, single-seat version
- KR-2 - two-seat, side-by-side version, 1900 completed by 2011.
- KR-2S - 16-inch-stretched-fuselage version of the KR-2, with 2.5 feet greater wingspan, made with composite sandwich construction, using the supercritical AS5045 airfoil. Standard engines include the 85 hp (63 kW) Jabiru 2200, 120 hp (89 kW) Jabiru 3300 and the 76 to 100 hp (57 to 75 kW) Volkswagen air-cooled engine. The model includes a 3-inch higher canopy. 100 completed and flown by 2011.
- KR-2T - tandem-seat version of the KR-2

== Aircraft on display ==
- EAA AirVenture Museum KR-1 N1436
- Queensland Air Museum KR-2 VH-XXS
- Wings Over the Rockies Air and Space Museum KR-1 N60BV

== Specifications (KR-2) ==
Data from nVAero

General characteristics

- Length: 14 ft 6 in (4.42 m)
- Wingspan: 20 ft 8 in (6.30 m)
- Wing area: 80 sq ft (7.4 m^{2})
- Empty weight: 480–750 lb (218–340 kg)
- Gross weight: 900–1,150 lb (408–522 kg)
- Fuel capacity: 12 to 35 U.S. gallons (45 to 132 L; 10.0 to 29.1 imp gal)
- Powerplant: 1 × Volkswagen air-cooled engine flat four cylinder, 80 hp (60 kW)

Performance

- Cruise speed: 150–175 mph (241–282 km/h, 130–152 kn)
- Stall speed: 52–60 mph (84–97 km/h, 45–52 kn)
- Range: 1,300 mi (2,100 km, 1,100 nmi) with 35 U.S. gallons (130 L; 29 imp gal) of fuel
- Service ceiling: 15,000 ft (4,600 m)
- Rate of climb: 800 ft/min (4.1 m/s)
- Wing loading: 14.4 lb/sq ft (70 kg/m^{2}) at 1150 lbs gross weight
