= Cessna NGP =

American light aircraft prototype

Next Generation Propeller
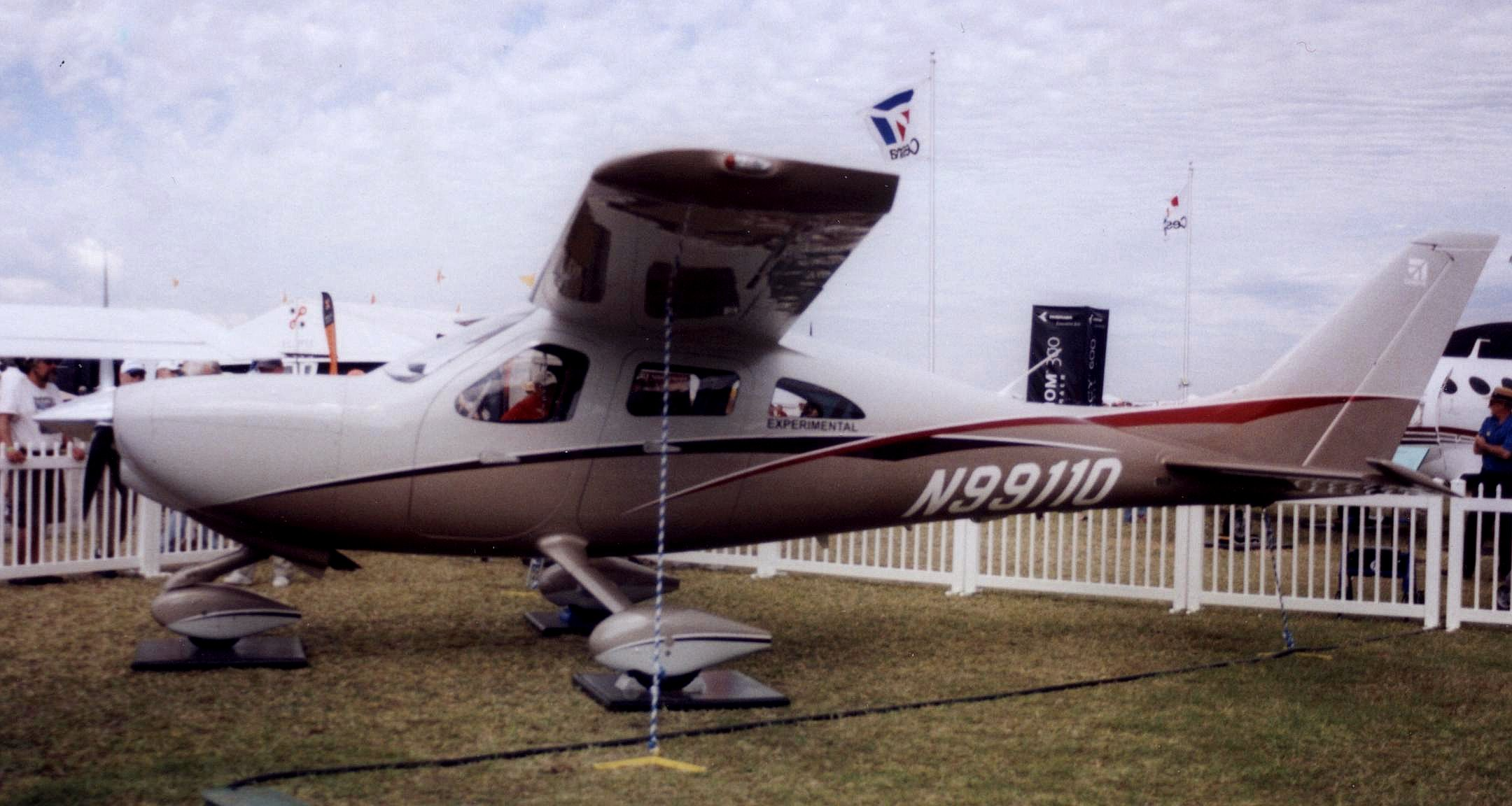
- The Cessna NGP prototype on display at Lakeland, Florida, in April 2007

General information
- Type: Proof-of-concept design
- Manufacturer: Cessna
- Status: Dormant
- Number built: 1

History
- First flight: June 23, 2006

The Cessna Next Generation Propeller Aircraft (NGP) was a proof-of-concept design for a future family of single engine, fixed-gear, high cantilever wing, light aircraft intended for personal, flight training and commercial use.

The single flying prototype, registered N99110, was flight tested by Cessna, and first seen publicly in flight on 24 July 2006 at EAA AirVenture Oshkosh.

== Nomenclature ==
The aircraft was originally introduced as the "Next Generation Piston", but starting in April 2008 Cessna began referring to it as the "Next Generation Propeller" aircraft instead. After absorbing the recently purchased Columbia Aircraft line, now known as the Cessna 350 and Cessna 400, Cessna indicated that it was re-positioning the NGP to fit logically into its current aircraft fleet. "Our team is working on finalizing the configuration," said Van Abel, Cessna's project engineer for the NGP in April 2008. “We continue to evaluate features and materials that will produce a new, unique aircraft family with a potential for multiple powerplants.” This indicates that the aircraft may become turbine or diesel powered so as not to conflict with sales of the 350 and 400.

== Design and development ==
Very little information was made public about the aircraft since development began sometime in early 2005. Cessna confirmed that the NGP was designed specifically to compete with other, newer aircraft. Due to its intended role as competition for the Cirrus SR22, it was frequently referred to in the aviation press as the "Cirrus Killer".

The NGP mock-up displayed at AOPA Air Expo 2006, in Palm Springs, California, had five seats. The aircraft was, at that time, intended be powered by a Lycoming IO-580 FADEC 320 hp (240 kW) engine controlled by a single power lever. The design mock-up had four doors with a separate baggage door on the left side, tricycle landing gear with a castering nose wheel and a forward-swept high-mounted wing of relatively small area.

Reportedly the prototype accumulated more than 20 hours of flying time between its first flight on 23 June 2006 and the fly-by at Oshkosh on 24 July 2006. During its appearance at AirVenture it was fully painted in a factory-style paint scheme and sported wheel pants. The structure was made from composite materials and aluminum, optimizing the available technology.

Cessna President and CEO Jack Pelton confirmed at AirVenture 2006 that the NGP was intended at that time to be the first of a new family of Cessna singles that would, in the long term, replace the Cessna 172 and 182 in production. Pelton also confirmed that while the prototype flew with a Lycoming powerplant, Cessna was examining alternative new technology engines as well. The prototype was exhibited at the April 2007 Sun 'n Fun general aviation event held at Lakeland, Florida.

On 27 November 2007, Cessna purchased Columbia Aircraft from bankruptcy for US$26.4M including its Columbia 350 and 400 line, which are in the same size and performance class as the NGP. These were introduced into the Cessna line as the Cessna 350 and Cessna 400 and initially built at former Columbia factory in Bend, Oregon. In 2009, Cessna closed the Bend plant and moved production to Wichita. The introduction of the similar Columbia designs caused media speculation that this would spell the end of the NGP project, but on September 26, 2007, Cessna Vice President for Sales, Roger Whyte confirmed that development of the Cessna NGP project was continuing, regardless of the purchase of Columbia.

In January 2009, Cessna CEO Jack Pelton gave an update on current Cessna projects under development and mentioned the 162 SkyCatcher, Cessna Citation Columbus and the Citation CJ4. No mention of the NGP project was made and the project's webpage was deleted.

On 30 March 2011, at Sun 'n Fun Cessna President Jack Pelton was interviewed by Paul Bertorelli of AvWeb about the NGP project and he indicated that it was "inactive but not mothballed" at that time, awaiting the right engine and avionics combination.

By August 2011, the prototype was no longer on the Federal Aviation Administration registry.

== See also ==
Related development

- Cessna 162

Aircraft of comparable role, configuration, and era

- Cirrus SR22
- Columbia 400
- Van's Aircraft RV-10
