= Lancair Mako =

American light kit airplane

Mako
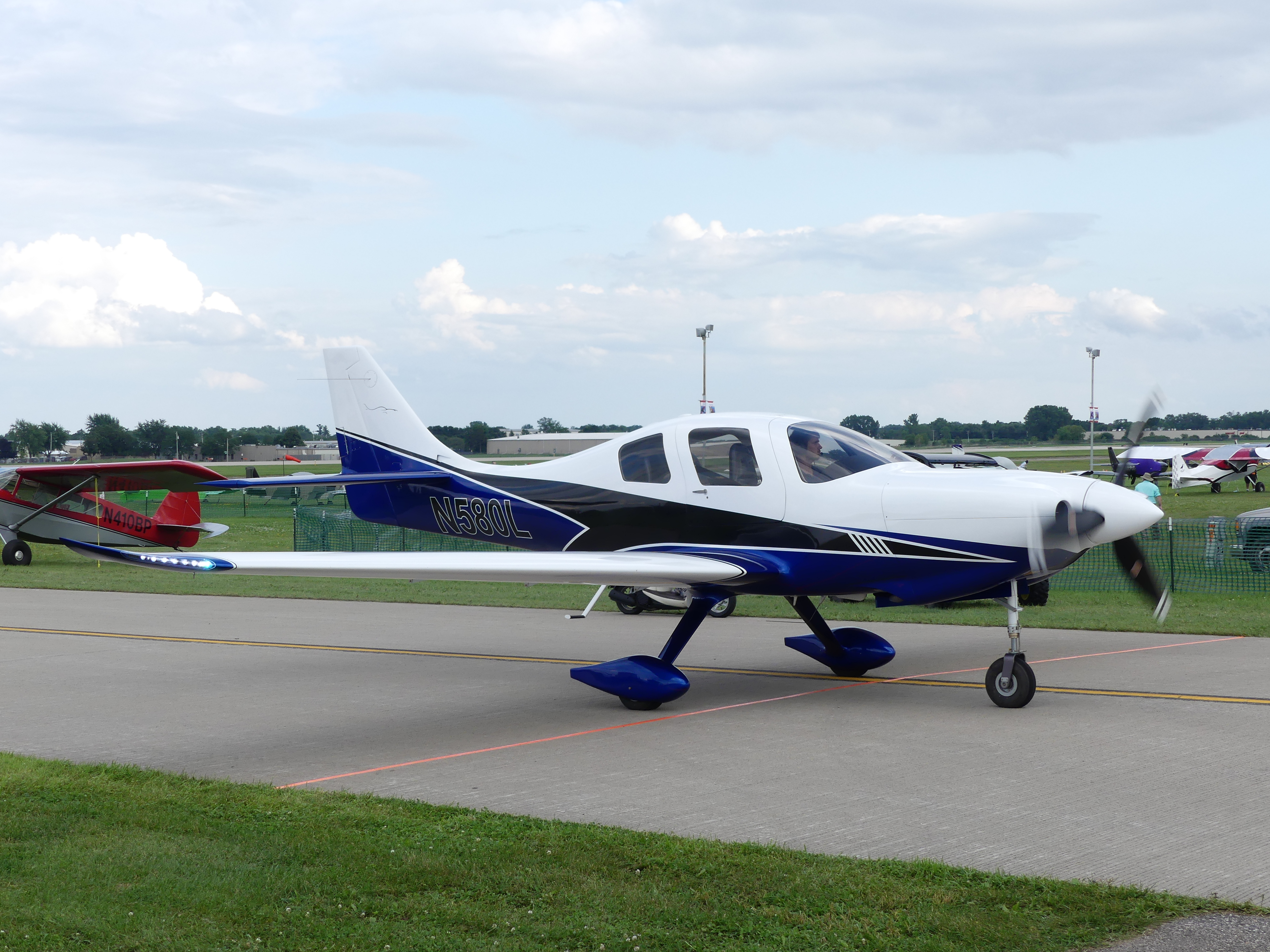

General information
- Type: Amateur-built aircraft
- National origin: United States
- Manufacturer: Lancair
- Status: In production (2019)

History
- Manufactured: 2018-present
- First flight: 18 July 2017
- Developed from: Lancair ES

The Lancair Mako is an American amateur-built aircraft designed and produced by Lancair of Uvalde, Texas, introduced at AirVenture in 2017. The aircraft was first flown on 18 July 2017 and is supplied as a kit for amateur construction. It is named after the shark.

The Mako was the first new design from Lancair since the company's purchase by Mark and Conrad Huffstutler and the company's relocation to Texas from Redmond, Oregon in 2017. The design is a development of the Lancair IV and Lancair ES and is related to the Columbia 300 and the later Cessna 400.

The design was intended to compete with the type certified Cirrus SR22 and the now out-of-production Cessna TTx, with higher performance for half the price.

== Design and development ==
Aircraft type's logo

The aircraft features a cantilever low-wing, a four-seat enclosed cabin accessed by doors, tricycle landing gear with an optional automatic retractable fully castering nose wheel, main landing gear with wheel pants and a single engine in tractor configuration.

The optional retractable nose gear automatically retracts when the onboard sensors measure the airspeed over 100 knots, 1,000 feet above the ground, throttle position above 30% power, weight off the wheels and flap position up. All five parameters must be met for the nose wheel to retract. Retracting the nosewheel increases cruise speed by up to 12 knots, due to its location in the disturbed air of the propeller slipstream. The system is fully automatic; there is no cockpit selection lever.

The aircraft is made from composites. The wing mounts flaps. The standard engines used are the 300 hp (224 kW) Lycoming IO-540, the 300 hp (224 kW) Continental IO-550, the turbocharged 350 hp (261 kW) Lycoming TIO-540 and the turbocharged 350 hp (261 kW) Continental TSIO-550 four-stroke powerplants for the T-Mako turbocharged version. A Ballistic Recovery Systems ballistic parachute is optional.

A center stick or side stick are optional, as is a ThermaWing heated wing or TKS weeping wing ice protection systems, air conditioning and heated seats.

The company's Builder Assistance program is included with the kit purchase price.

Kit production commenced in January 2018, with an initial goal of producing one kit per month.

== Operational history ==
In a 2017 flight test review Aircraft Owners and Pilots Association Pilot Editor at Large, Dave Hirschman described the design noting, "the Mako’s first impression is that it’s big and sleek—like its shark namesake. It strongly resembles a Lancair IV because the two models use the same fuselage and retractable nosewheel ... The Mako is sleek and appealing on the outside—and it’s comfortable, roomy, with good visibility and terrific avionics on the inside." Hirchman was critical of the nose gear retraction automation, saying, "Personally, I’d prefer either fixed or fully retractable landing gear. Call me old-fashioned, but if the gear moves, I want to have a lever for that—even though I recognize I’m less reliable than software."

Flying Magazine reviewer, Pia Bergqvist, flew the design in 2018 and wrote, "Flying the Mako is simply a joy. While the control feel could be a bit lighter (something Conrad is working on), it is a solid platform that will help the pilot stay out of trouble. I tried to get the airplane to stall but couldn’t get it to break. With Conrad’s help, we brought it to 56 knots, 6 knots below the red line on the airspeed indicator. An AOA gauge popped up automatically on the G3X, and it was well in the red. There was no tendency for the nose or a wing to drop as we floated downward at about 1,000 fpm."

== Specifications (T-Mako) ==
Data from Manufacturer

General characteristics

- Crew: one
- Capacity: three passengers
- Empty weight: 2,250 lb (1,021 kg)
- Gross weight: 3,550 lb (1,610 kg)
- Fuel capacity: 75 U.S. gallons (280 L; 62 imp gal), optional 109 U.S. gallons (410 L; 91 imp gal)
- Powerplant: 1 × Continental TSIO-550 six cylinder, air-cooled, turbocharged four stroke aircraft engine, 350 hp (260 kW)
- Propellers: 3-bladed constant speed propeller

Performance

- Maximum speed: 245 kn (282 mph, 454 km/h) true airspeed
- Cruise speed: 225 kn (259 mph, 417 km/h) true airspeed at 25,000 feet
- Stall speed: 58 kn (67 mph, 107 km/h) in landing configuration
- Never exceed speed: 220 kn (250 mph, 410 km/h) indicated airspeed
- Range: 1,100 nmi (1,300 mi, 2,000 km)
- Service ceiling: 28,000 ft (8,500 m)

Avionics

- Garmin G3X Touch glass cockpit

== See also ==
- List of aerobatic aircraft
