= Engineered Propulsion Systems Graflight V-8 =

American diesel aircraft engine

Graflight V-8
- Type: Liquid-cooled V-8 piston diesel aircraft engine
- National origin: United States
- Manufacturer: Engineered Propulsion Systems
- Designer: Michael Fuchs and Steven Weinzierl
- First run: 2014
- Major applications: Cirrus SR22

The Graflight V-8 is an aircraft diesel engine developed by Wisconsin-based Engineered Propulsion Systems

== Design ==
The Graflight is a liquid-cooled, V-8 with steel pistons and compacted graphite iron crankcase for better strength and durability than aluminum at similar weight, increasing time between overhauls to 3,000 hours. It is managed by a Bosch ECU and can run on Jet A, JP-8 or straight diesel fuel. It is intended to be used in general aviation airplanes, small helicopters, military drones, small boats or troop carriers. The engine is specifically targeting the Robinson R44, Beech Bonanza, GippsAero GA8 Airvan, Cessna TTx and Cessna 206 as possible applications.

The design is a 320–450 hp (240–340 kW), 4.3-liter engine with steel pistons, connecting rods, and crankcase to improve reliability. At 650 lb (290 kg), it weighs 40 to 50 lb (18 to 23 kg) more than a conventional aircraft engine, not including the 30 lb (14 kg) radiator for cooling. It should be 30-40% more expensive to purchase than a comparable avgas engine, but with 30-50% better fuel economy. Its low vibration levels allow the use of composite or aluminum propellers.

The engine's 17:1 compression ratio gives it a best brake specific fuel consumption of less than 0.32 lb/(hp⋅h) (195 g/kWh), compared to typical avgas engines with 0.42 lb/(hp⋅h) (255 g/kWh). It is expected that the Graflight V-8 will burn under 11 US gal/h (42 L/h) of fuel at 65% power.

As a direct comparison, the 350 hp (261 kW) version of the Graflight V-8 engine will weigh 30 to 50 lb (14 to 23 kg) more than the comparable Lycoming TIO-540-AE2A (595 lb (270 kg) dry) or Continental TSIO-550-E (498.4 lb (226.1 kg) dry). It will cost 30% more, but with a higher time between overhaul and lower fuel burn, it will have lower operating costs. At normal 75% cruise power, the Graflight V-8 consumes 77 lb/h (35 kg/h) of fuel, whereas the Continental TSIO-550-E burns 110 lb/h (50 kg/h), a reduction of 30%.

== Development ==
EPS set out to certify a new-design flat 8 engine, to replace existing 320–420 hp (240–310 kW) general aviation gasoline engines, with the aim of reducing fuel costs by 45%. EPS started work on the design in 2006, a process that took five years. The engine was first flown in May 2014, first exhibited at the 2017 EAA AirVenture and FAA certification was expected at that time by the end of the year.

Later in 2017 the testing progress was delayed by insufficient funding. By July 2018 it had completed 25 hours of flight testing on a Cirrus Aircraft airplane. At that point the company hoped to attract Fortune 500 investors and planned that a new demonstrator should be ready in the first quarter of 2019. The production version of the engine was shown at AERO Friedrichshafen in April 2019 and work continued on environmental and block testing towards the goal of type certification.

Unable to obtain the needed financing to continue operations, the company filed for Chapter 11 bankruptcy protection in August 2020.

== Applications ==
- Cirrus SR22

== Specifications (Graflight V-8) ==
Data from EPS

=== General characteristics ===
- Type: V-8 piston diesel aircraft engine
- Displacement: 4.3L

=== Components ===
- Fuel type: Jet A, JP-8 or straight diesel
- Cooling system: liquid cooled

=== Performance ===
- Power output: 350 hp (261 kW)
- Compression ratio: 17:1
- Fuel consumption: 9.74 to 17.55 US gal/h (36.9 to 66.4 L/h) from 210 to 350 hp (157 to 261 kW)
- Specific fuel consumption: 0.315 to 0.34 lb/(hp⋅h) (192 to 207 g/kWh)
