= Freedom Aviation Phoenix =

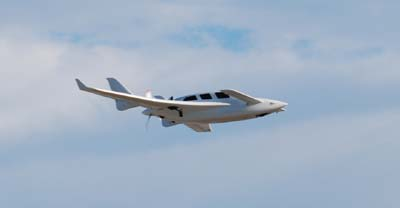

General information
- Type: Utility aircraft
- Manufacturer: Freedom Aviation for homebuilding
- Designer: Freedom Aviation

History
- Introduction date: 26 April 2007
- First flight: 20 August 2007

The Freedom Aviation Phoenix was a single-engine four-seat American airplane that was sold as a homebuilt composite canard aircraft.

The kit was produced at a facility on St. Lucie County International Airport at Ft. Pierce, Florida.

== Design and development ==
The Phoenix airframe was formed of carbon-fiber composite materials on factory molds. The aircraft was assembled as a homebuilt, with a factory-sponsored builder-assist program available.

The aircraft has a swept, dihedral canard mounted ahead of the cabin, and a swept main lifting surface. Each wing has a fin (with full-length rudder) mounted about midway to the tip. In addition, the wingtips have swept winglets, which provide additional yaw stability while decreasing induced drag.

The Phoenix is powered by a six-cylinder horizontally opposed piston engine driving a pusher propeller. The tricycle landing gear is retractable.

Only one aircraft was ever built, and the company has since gone out of business.

== Specifications (Phoenix) ==
General characteristics

- Crew: 1
- Capacity: 3 pax / maximum 1,500 lb (680 kg) / 750 lb (340 kg) with full fuel
- Length: 22 ft 6 in (6.86 m)
- Wingspan: 34 ft 5 in (10.49 m)
- Height: 7 ft 3 in (2.21 m)
- Fuel capacity: 125 US gal (104 imp gal; 470 L)
- Cabin width: 50 in (1,300 mm)
- Cabin height: 44 in (1,100 mm)
- Cabin length: 129 in (3,300 mm)
- Powerplant: 1 × Continental IO-550 6-cylinder horizontally-opposed air-cooled piston engine, 310 hp (230 kW)

Performance

- Cruise speed: 185 kn (213 mph, 343 km/h) at 65% power
- Stall speed: 70 kn (81 mph, 130 km/h)
- Never exceed speed: 215 kn (247 mph, 398 km/h) IAS
- Range: 1,400 nmi (1,600 mi, 2,600 km) with 30 minute reserve
- Rate of climb: 1,300 ft/min (6.6 m/s)
- Fuel consumption: 0.423 lb/mi (0.119 kg/km)
