= Yakovlev Yak-112 =

Yak-112
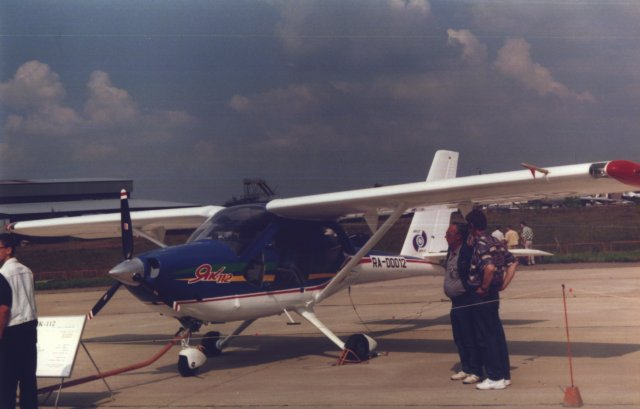
- Yak-112 prototype at Zhukovski, 1997

General information
- Type: Trainer / Glider tug
- National origin: USSR
- Manufacturer: Yakovlev
- Designer: Vladimir Mitkin

History
- First flight: 20 October 1992

The Yakovlev Yak-112 Filin (Owl) is a Russian/Soviet civil utility aircraft that first flew in 1992. It is an all-metal high-wing strut braced monoplane with fixed tricycle landing gear.

== Specifications (Yak-112) ==
Data from The Osprey Encyclopaedia of Russian Aircraft 1875 – 1995, Flying Magazine Sep 1991

General characteristics

- Crew: 1
- Capacity: 2 PAX
- Length: 6.96 m (22 ft 10 in)
- Wingspan: 10.25 m (33 ft 8 in)
- Height: 2.9 m (9 ft 6 in)
- Wing area: 16.96 m^{2} (182.6 sq ft)
- Empty weight: 950 kg (2,094 lb)
- Gross weight: 1,300 kg (2,866 lb)
- Max takeoff weight: 1,520 kg (3,351 lb)
- Powerplant: 1 × Lycoming IO-540 6-cyl. horizontally opposed air-cooled piston engine, 191 kW (256 hp)Lycoming IO-360-A1B6 or Continental IO-550
- Propellers: 3-bladed Hartzell Propeller

Performance

- Maximum speed: 230 km/h (140 mph, 120 kn)
- Cruise speed: 193 km/h (120 mph, 104 kn)
- Range: 1,000 km (620 mi, 540 nmi)
- Service ceiling: 4,000 m (13,000 ft)

Avionics
Bendix King
