= Lancair ES =

American light aircraft

ES
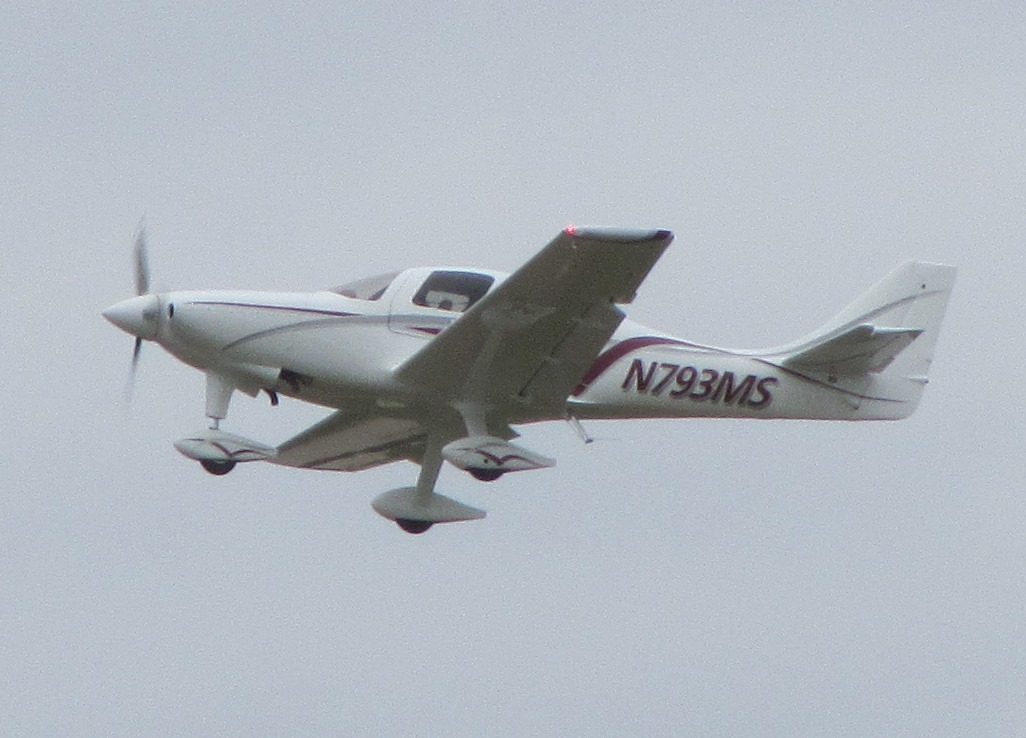
- Lancair Super ES

General information
- Type: Homebuilt aircraft
- National origin: United States
- Manufacturer: Lancair
- Status: Production completed in 2012
- Number built: 90 (2011)

History
- Introduction date: 2001
- Developed from: Lancair IV
- Variants: Cessna 400; Lancair Mako

The Lancair ES is an American amateur-built aircraft that was designed and produced by Lancair. While it was in production the aircraft was supplied as a kit for amateur construction.

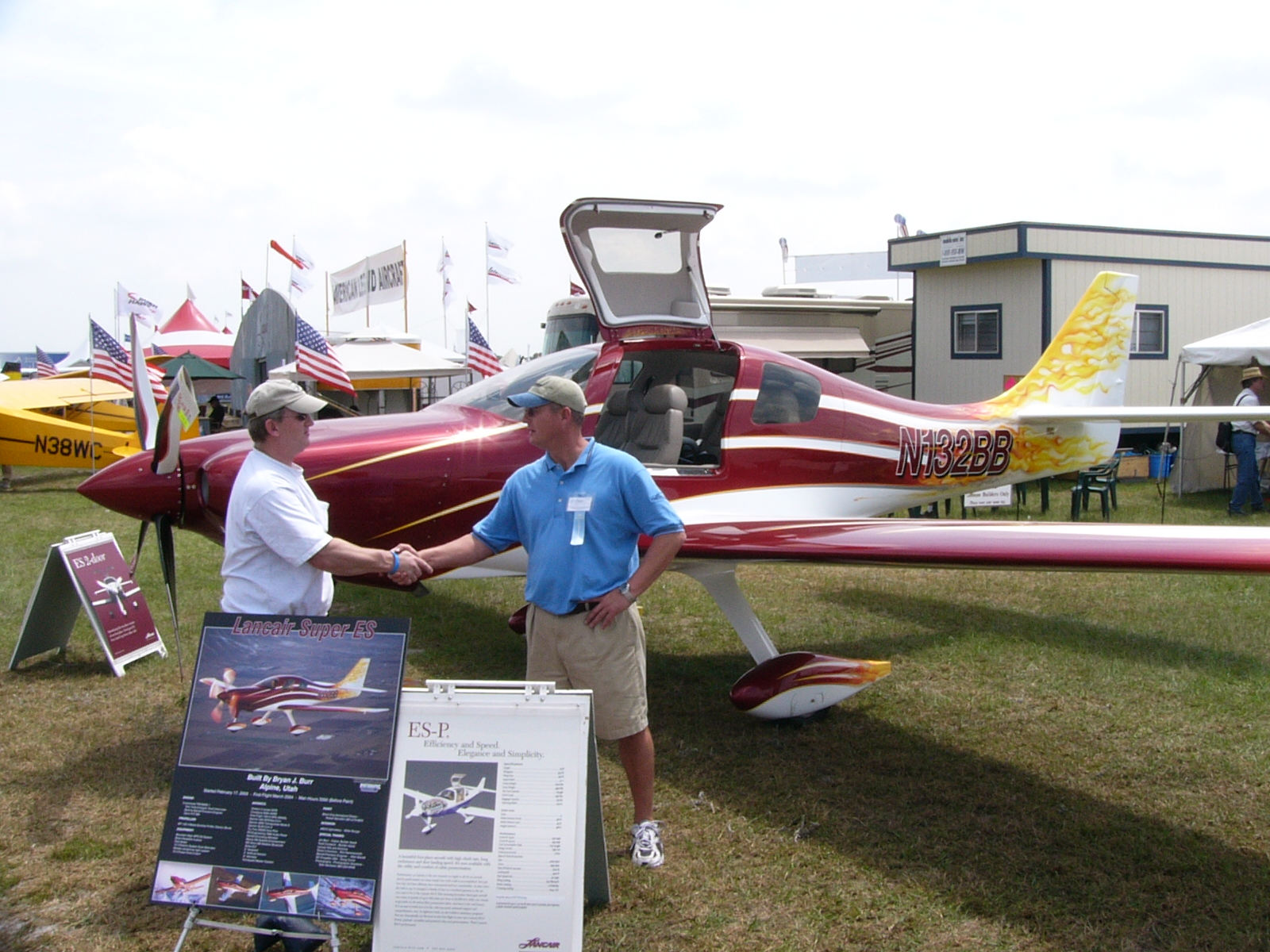
Super ES at Sun 'n Fun 2006

Production of the aircraft kit was ended in 2012.

== Design and development ==
The aircraft features a cantilever low wing, a four-seat enclosed cabin that is 46 in (117 cm) wide, fixed tricycle landing gear and a single engine in tractor configuration.

The aircraft is made from composites. Its 35.5 ft (10.8 m) span wing employs a McWilliams RXM5-217 airfoil at the wing root, transitioning to a NACA 64-212 at the wingtip. The wing has an area of 140 sq ft (13 m^{2}) and mounts flaps. The aircraft's recommended engine power range is 210 to 310 hp (157 to 231 kW) and standard engines used include the 310 hp (231 kW) Continental IO-550 four-stroke powerplant. Construction time from the supplied kit is estimated to be 2000 hours.

When equipped with the 310 hp (231 kW) Continental IO-550-N the design was referred to as the Lancair Super ES. This was same powerplant used in the Columbia 300 and 350.

In July 2016 the company announced it would be selling the older Lancair lines of aircraft to concentrate on the Lancair Evolution instead. Once the transition is complete the company will change its name to the Evolution Aircraft Company.

== Operational history ==
By December 2011, 90 examples had been completed and flown. At least two examples have utilized custom engine mounts to allow installation of Lycoming IO-540 engines.

Philippine Aerospace Development Corporation produced 6 units.

== Specifications (Super ES) ==
Data from Kitplanes

General characteristics

- Crew: one
- Capacity: three passengers
- Length: 25 ft 0 in (7.62 m)
- Wingspan: 35 ft 6 in (10.82 m)
- Wing area: 140 sq ft (13 m^{2})
- Empty weight: 2,200 lb (998 kg)
- Gross weight: 3,550 lb (1,610 kg)
- Fuel capacity: 105 U.S. gallons (400 L; 87 imp gal)
- Powerplant: 1 × Continental IO-550 six cylinder, air-cooled, four stroke aircraft engine, 310 hp (230 kW)

Performance

- Cruise speed: 215 mph (346 km/h, 187 kn)
- Stall speed: 70 mph (110 km/h, 61 kn)
- Range: 1,400 mi (2,300 km, 1,200 nmi)
- Rate of climb: 2,000 ft/min (10 m/s)
- Wing loading: 25.4 lb/sq ft (124 kg/m^{2})
