= Columbia Aircraft =

American light aircraft manufacturer

- Type: privately held company
- Industry: general aviation
- Founded: April 3, 1995
- Defunct: November 27, 2007
- Fate: Chapter 11 & taken over by Cessna
- Headquarters: Bend, Oregon
- Products: Columbia 300; Columbia 350; Columbia 400
- Parent: Cessna/Textron

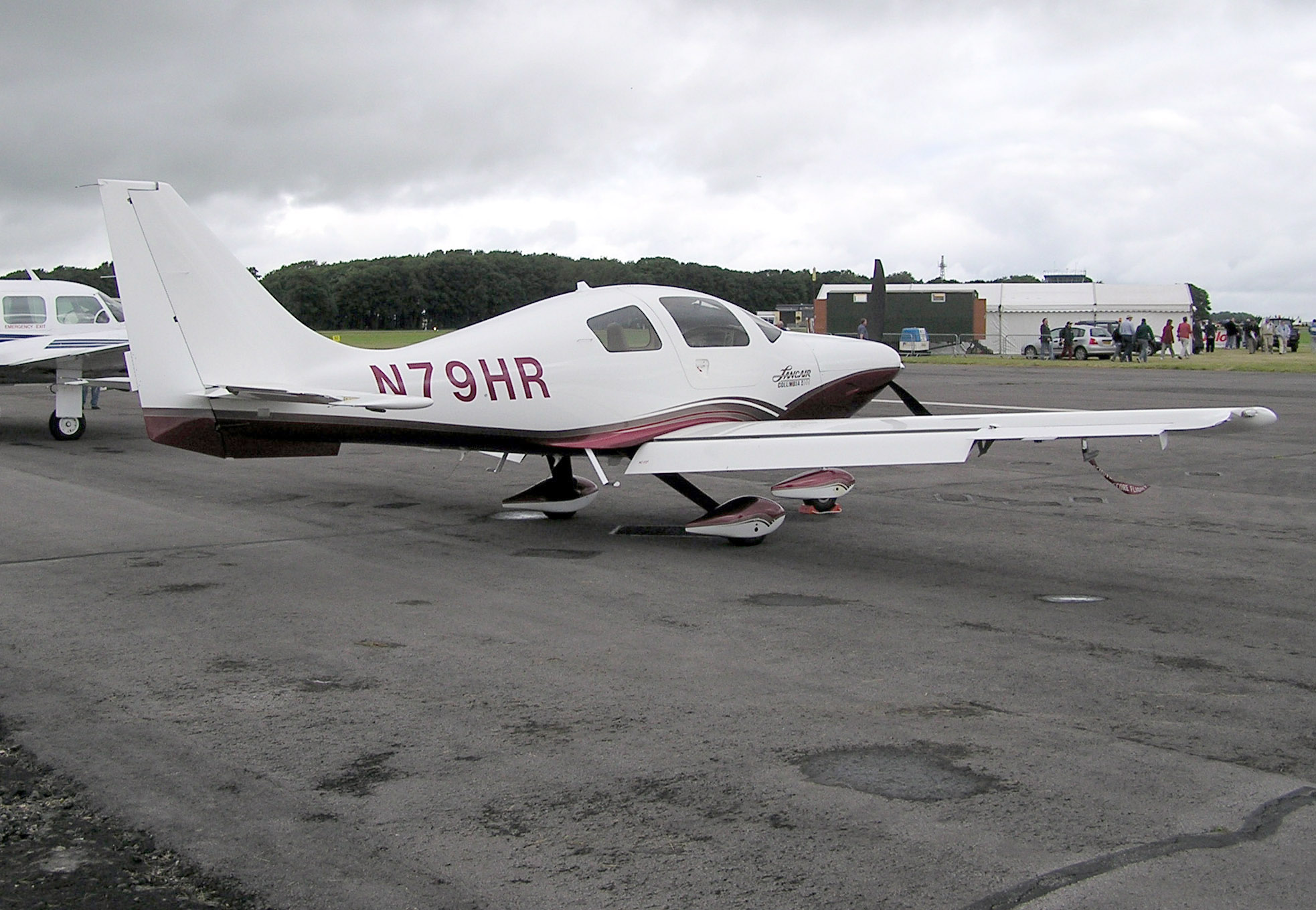
Columbia 400

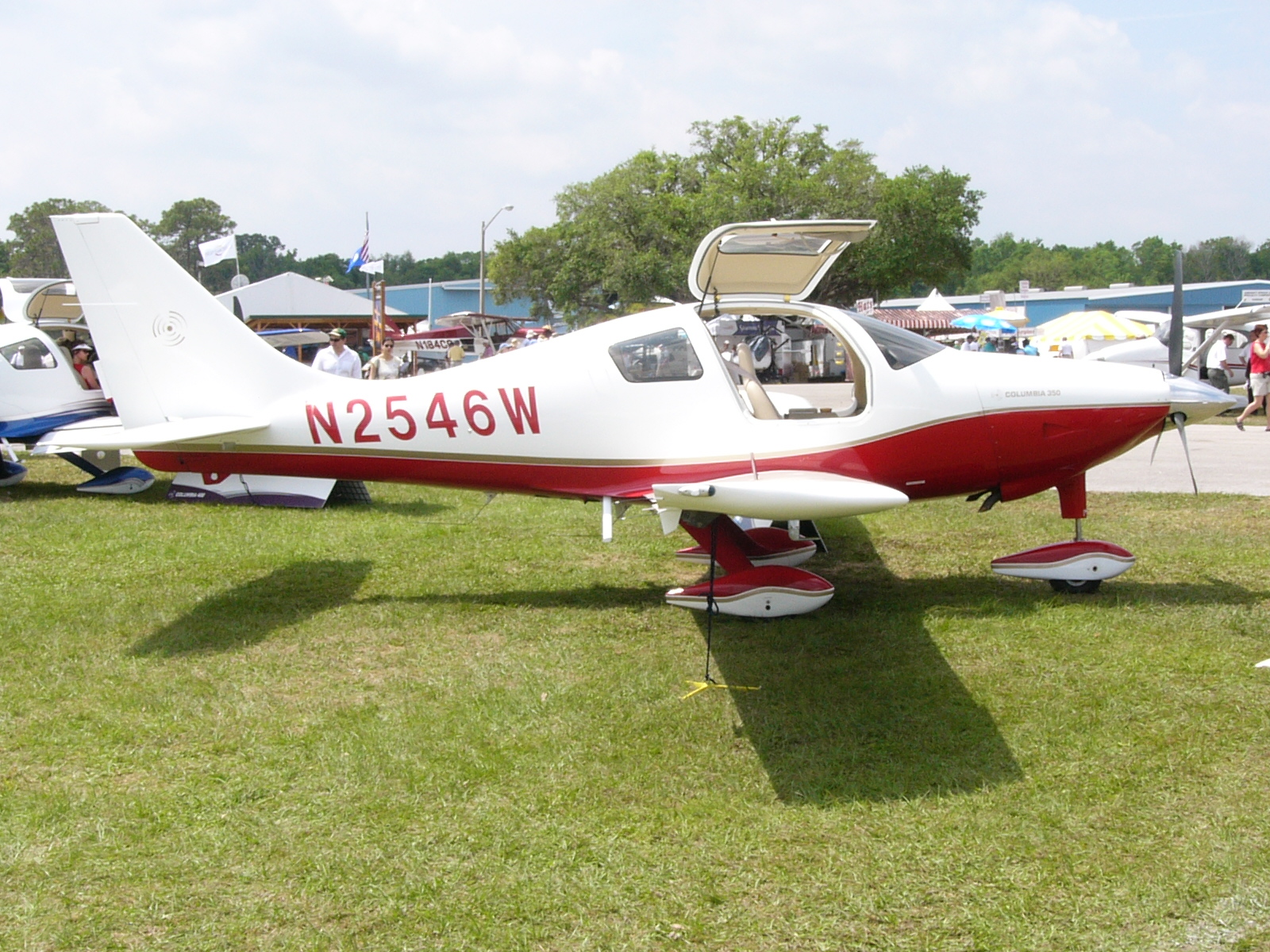
Columbia 350 at Sun 'n Fun 2006

The Columbia Aircraft Manufacturing Corporation was an aircraft manufacturer that designed and built light general aviation aircraft. In November 2007, it became a division of Cessna.

== History ==
In 1994 NASA launched the Advanced General Aviation Transport Experiments (AGATE) project in an attempt to re-energize the rapidly shrinking general aviation (GA) market. A series of factors, including new regulatory requirements and immense legal liability lawsuit settlements made the GA field unprofitable and most manufacturers had abandoned production of piston-engined light aircraft to concentrate on the business turbine aircraft market. As a result, GA design work had basically ended and aircraft for sale in 1990 were essentially the same as those from the 1970s. With a thriving market for used aircraft, American GA aircraft production numbers declined from 18,000 in 1978 to 954 in 1993, an all-time low.

During the same period the kit-built market was thriving. Free of some of the problems that certified aircraft had, and populated largely by experimenters looking for better performance, the kit market expanded rapidly in the 1980s. Designs available as kits often surpassed the performance of certified aircraft, while also being much less expensive. A leading kit manufacturer, Lancair's high performance Lancair IV design set a number of records, including a long-range flight at 360–mph.

As part of AGATE, NASA used a Lancair ES as a testbed for advanced avionics fits. The ES was a version of the unpressurized Lancair IV with fixed landing gear. Lancair founder Lance Neibauer was encouraged to certify the design, which would make it one of the first all-new GA aircraft certified in years.

On April 3, 1995, Lancair established a new company, Pacific Aviation Composites USA, in Redmond, Oregon. Originally intended simply to spread out production of the existing Lancair aircraft product lines, the new factory was rechristened Lancair Certified and was used as the main site for what was then known as the Lancair LC-40, for "Lancair Certified, model 40". The first prototype flew in July 1996, followed by the certification prototype in early 1997.

After a lengthy development and certification process the aircraft was officially certified on September 18, 1998, as the Model LC40-550FG and marketed under the name Columbia 300. Lancair Certified was renamed Columbia Aircraft Manufacturing Corporation in 2005 to focus on the new design. Neibauer sold the kit-build portion of the company, Lancair International, to Joseph Bartels in March 2003.

The 300 was the fastest fixed-gear aircraft in the world when it was released, but held this title only for a short period until the turbocharged Columbia 400 (Model LC41-550FG) flew in June 2000. The 400 also featured a new glass cockpit developed under the AGATE program, which Columbia refers to as the "Highway in the Sky" (HITS). The 400 was certified on March 30, 2003.

The upgrades used in the Columbia 400 were then incorporated in the original 300 design to create the Model LC42-550FG, marketed as the Columbia 350. It appeared in April 2002 and was certified on April 8, 2004.

In January 2003, Composites Technology Research Malaysia (CTRM) bought a controlling interest in Columbia for over $50 million. CTRM is owned by the Malaysian government and was incorporated in November 1990 by Minister of Finance Malaysia Inc. CTRM's CEO is Retired Col. Rosdi Mahmud. CTRM became interested in selling its share of the company in 2006.

All of the Columbia aircraft competed heavily with similar designs from Cirrus Design, which was also developed under AGATE and included many of the same features. First to market, the SR22 outsold the Columbia models by a wide margin.

On September 24, 2007 Columbia Aircraft announced that Textron would purchase the company, which would be merged with its Cessna division, including its line of high-performance single-engined aircraft. As part of the sale agreement Columbia Aircraft was to enter Chapter 11 bankruptcy protection. The arrangement would be subject to approval of the bankruptcy court and also to a final agreement with Cessna.

The fate of Columbia Aircraft was complicated on October 14, 2007 when three additional companies entered the bidding for Columbia Aircraft. These were Columbia's competitor, Cirrus Design as well as Versa Capital Management and Park Electrochemical Corp. The two latter companies filed motions with the bankruptcy court stating that Cessna has been "getting preferential treatment in the process". On 20 November 2007 Cirrus Design announced that they would not pursue purchasing Columbia, citing Columbia's problems as being too serious and that resolving them would require excessive resources.

On November 27, 2007, Cessna's parent company Textron announced that Cessna Aircraft was the successful bidder for Columbia Aircraft, that the Columbia 350 and 400 are renamed the Cessna 350 and Cessna 400 and that all existing Columbia aircraft will be supported by Cessna. Cessna paid US$26.4M for the company and committed to investing in the current company location on the southeast corner of Bend Municipal Airport in Bend, Oregon.

On April 29, 2009, Cessna announced that it would close the former Columbia plant in Bend, Oregon facility where the Cessna 350 and 400 were built and move production to Kansas. The company laid-off all the remaining 150 employees at the Bend plant.

== Columbia aircraft ==
- Columbia 300 - production completed
- Columbia 350 - later known as the Cessna 350
- Columbia 400 - later known as the Cessna 400
