= Schweizer RU-38 Twin Condor =

Twin-engined reconnaissance aircraft

RU-38 Twin Condor
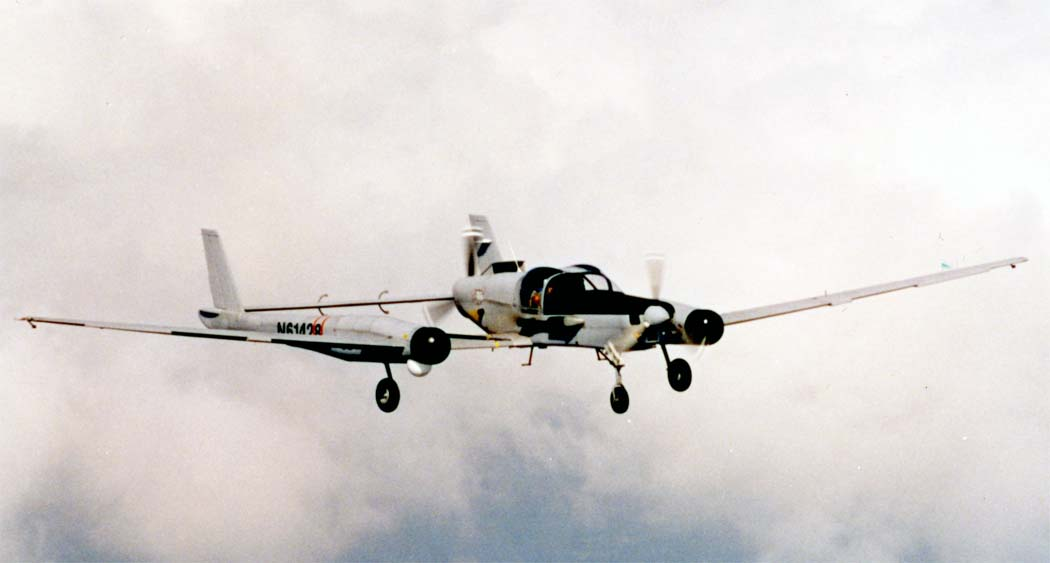

General information
- Type: Covert reconnaissance aircraft
- National origin: United States
- Manufacturer: Schweizer Aircraft Corporation
- Designer: Leslie Schweizer
- Status: In production
- Primary users: US Coast Guard US Dept of Justice
- Number built: RU-38A - 2 RU-38B - 3

History
- Manufactured: RU-38A 1995-1997; RU-38B 2004-2005
- Introduction date: May 1997
- First flight: 31 May 1995
- Developed from: RG-8A

The Schweizer RU-38 Twin Condor is a two or three-seat, fixed gear, low wing, twin boom covert reconnaissance aircraft.

RU-38 is the US military designation for the aircraft, indicating Utility, Reconnaissance. The Schweizer company model number is Schweizer SA 2-38A Condor and, in its three-seat configuration, Schweizer SA 3-38A Condor

Based on the Schweizer SGM 2-37 motor glider, a total of five RU-38s were produced between 1995 and 2005. The aircraft remains in production by Sikorsky Aircraft after acquiring Schweizer.

== Background ==
The development of the Schweizer SGM 2-37 motor glider for training use at the United States Air Force Academy led to two reconnaissance versions of that design, carrying the company model numbers SA 2-37A and SA 2-37B. In Central Intelligence Agency, United States Army and United States Coast Guard service these were designated RG-8A and RG-8B. The RG-8s were employed in border security and surveillance missions.

In the mid-1990s, the Coast Guard decided that the aircraft would be more useful if their capabilities were improved to include night operations by the addition of more mission sensor equipment. Discussions with Schweizer Aircraft resulted in a plan to upgrade two RG-8As and to build one new aircraft to provide a total of three.

== Development ==
The RU-38 was intended to fulfill both the low altitude, quiet, over water/hostile terrain reconnaissance role and also the high altitude standoff surveillance role.

The design missions for the RU-38A were:

- Border integrity
- Counter-terrorism surveillance
- Drug enforcement
- Electronic intelligence
- Fishery patrols
- Illegal alien surveillance
- Intelligence collection
- Maritime patrol
- Pollution patrol & environmental monitoring
- Search and rescue

In converting to the new RU-38A configuration, the conventional RG-8A airframe was greatly modified by:

- Removing the single 235 hp (175 kW) Lycoming O-540-B powerplant
- Installing two Teledyne Continental Motors GIO-550A engines with a 3:2 gear reduction to 2267 rpm propeller operating speed. The engines are mounted one in the nose and the other in the rear of the fuselage.
- Enlarging the crew compartment
- Improving the engine mufflers
- Increasing the wingspan from 56.5 ft (17.22m) to 84.13 ft (25.65 m)
- Changing the single tail fin to a twin-boom configuration with two fins
- Greatly enlarged sensor bays
- Improved noise signature reduction
- Tricycle landing gear replacing the conventional landing gear

=== RU-38A ===
The resulting aircraft bears little resemblance to the original RG-8A. Installation of the twin-boom pods permits the carriage of more sensors. The left-hand pod houses an AN/APN-215(V) color multi-function X-band sea search radar with mapping capabilities. The right-hand pod houses the AN/AAQ-15 forward-looking infrared (FLIR) and Low-Light TV (LLTV) enhanced vision systems.

For navigation, the RU-38A originally carried both OMEGA and GPS receivers, although the Omega has since been removed with that system's withdrawal from service in 1997. The aircraft also has HF, VHF and UHF radios for voice and encrypted voice communications, plus direction finding. The crew may also use night vision goggles.

The aircraft has no flaps, and instead retains the top and bottom surface dive brakes of its sailplane ancestors. Maximum take-off weight of the RU-38A is 5300 lb (2404 kg)

The RU-38A is designed to transit to its operational area with both engines operating. Once in the surveillance area, the rear engine would normally be shut down, propeller feathered, and the aircraft operated in "quiet surveillance mode". The second engine would be available for use in an emergency and for return to base at higher speed.

The first Coast Guard RG-8A was returned to Schweizer for conversion to RU-38A status on 24 January 1994. The initial plan called for the conversion of two RG-8As and then fabrication of one new RU-38A.

The first flight of the converted aircraft took place on 31 May 1995. The second USCG RG-8A aircraft that was earmarked for RU-38A upgrade crashed near Puerto Rico in 1996. As a result, the program was reduced to provide only two RU-38As to the USCG. The loss of the RG-8A delayed the program for many months and it was not completed until May 1997.

The first RU-38 was tested by the Air Force 445th Test Squadron at Edwards Air Force Base on behalf of the Coast Guard, starting in July 1998. The aircraft flew some 100 test flights during the four-month program.

By September 1999, the two RU-38As had been delivered to the Coast Guard in Miami, Florida for operational employment. The RU-38As were flown in drug interdiction missions over the Gulf of Mexico and the Caribbean Sea, but they were reportedly grounded during 2000, due to problems with the aircraft meeting mission requirements or serviceability.

=== RU-38B ===
The company further improved the aircraft by replacing the two piston engines with two Rolls-Royce Allison 250-B17F turboprop engines, which allowed raising the gross weight to 7200 lb (3265 kg). The new aircraft carries the military designation of RU-38B.

The RU-38B has 140 cubic feet (4.0 cu m) of payload space, with a payload weight of 800 lbs (363 kg) available. The payload bays all have large access doors, and are located both in the tail booms and also behind the pilot and co-pilot seats in the fuselage. The latter space can also accommodate a third crew member, if required. Using pallet-mounted sensor packages, the aircraft can be quickly changed from one mission to another.

The RU-38B is able to achieve quiet operation while loitering by using a propeller speed as low as 1000 rpm. This is possible because the sailplane-derived wing is efficient, and flight at low airspeed can be sustained with low power. Exhaust from the front engine is routed over the wing, reducing the noise footprint.

Two RU-38Bs were delivered to the U.S. Department of Justice, one in 2004 and one in 2005.

The RU-38B model was still being actively marketed by Schweizer in 2011.

== Certification ==
Neither the RU-38A or RU-38B was certified by the Federal Aviation Administration. Instead, all aircraft operate as experimental aircraft in the Research and Development category.

== Operators ==
United States

- Schweizer Aircraft - Two RU-38A and one RU-38B
- United States Department of Justice - two RU-38B

== Specifications (RU-38B) ==
Data from Schweizer Aircraft

General characteristics

- Crew: two in side-by-side seating or three, with two pilots in side-by-side seating and one sensor operator in the rear
- Capacity: 2935 lb (1331 kg) useful load
- Length: 35 ft 1 in (10.7 m)
- Wingspan: 84 ft 1.6 in (25.64 m)
- Wing area: 334.2 sq ft (31.05 m^{2})
- Airfoil: Wortmann Fx 61-163
- Empty weight: 4,265 lb (1,934 kg)
- Gross weight: 7,200 lb (3,265 kg)
- Max takeoff weight: 7,200 lb (3,265 kg)
- Powerplant: 2 × Rolls-Royce Allison 250-B17F Constant Speed, Full Feather

Performance

- Maximum speed: 168 kn (194 mph, 312 km/h)
- Cruise speed: 83 kn (96 mph, 155 km/h) (mission speed)
- Stall speed: 62 kn (72 mph, 116 km/h) with divebrakes closed
- Never exceed speed: 168 kn (194 mph, 312 km/h)
- Service ceiling: 30,000 ft (9,144 m)
- Wing loading: 21.5 lb/sq ft (105.1 kg/m^{2})
