= Cessna =

Aircraft manufacturing subsidiary of Textron

Cessna Aircraft Company
- Formerly: Cessna-Roos Aircraft Company (September–October 1927)
- Type: Brand
- Traded as: NYSE: CSN (until 1985)
- Industry: Aerospace
- Founded: September 7, 1927; 99 years ago
- Founders: Clyde Cessna; Victor Roos
- Headquarters: Wichita, Kansas, United States
- Key people: Scott A. Ernest (CEO from May 31, 2011)
- Products: List of models
- Number of employees: 8,500 (2013)
- Parent: Textron Aviation
- Subsidiaries: McCauley Propeller Systems
- Website: cessna.txtav.com

Cessna (/ˈsɛsnə/) is an American brand of general aviation aircraft owned by Textron Aviation since 2014, headquartered in Wichita, Kansas. Originally, it was a brand of the Cessna Aircraft Company, an American general aviation aircraft manufacturing corporation also headquartered in Wichita. The company produced small, piston-powered aircraft, as well as business jets. For much of the mid-to-late 20th century, Cessna was one of the highest-volume and most diverse producers of general aviation aircraft in the world. It was founded in 1927 by Clyde Cessna and Victor Roos and was purchased by General Dynamics in 1985, then by Textron in 1992. In March 2014, when Textron purchased the Beechcraft and Hawker Aircraft corporations, Cessna ceased operations as a subsidiary company, and joined the others as one of the three distinct brands produced by Textron Aviation.

Throughout its history, and especially in the years following World War II, Cessna became best known for producing small, high-wing, piston aircraft. Its most popular and iconic aircraft is the Cessna 172, delivered since 1956 (with a break from 1986 to 1996), with more sold than any other aircraft in history. Since the first model was delivered in 1972, the brand has also been well known for its Citation family of low-wing business jets which vary in size.

== History ==
=== Origins ===
Clyde Cessna, a farmer in Rago, Kansas, built his own aircraft and flew it in June 1911. He was the first person to do so between the Mississippi River and the Rocky Mountains. Cessna started his wood-and-fabric aircraft ventures in Enid, Oklahoma, testing many of his early planes on the salt flats. When bankers in Enid refused to lend him more money to build his planes, he moved to Wichita.

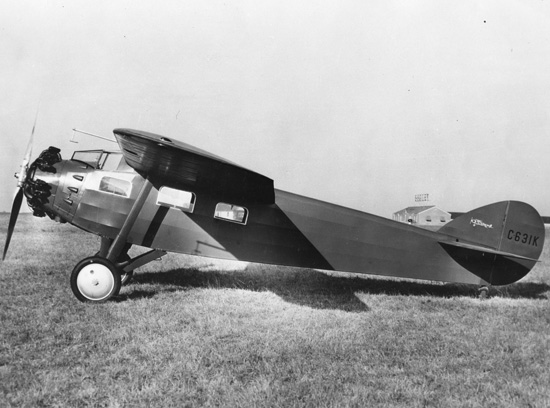
Cessna DC-6, circa 1930s

Cessna Aircraft was formed when Clyde Cessna and Victor Roos became partners in the Cessna-Roos Aircraft Company in 1927. Roos resigned just one month into the partnership, selling back his interest to Cessna. Shortly afterward, Roos's name was dropped from the company name.

The Cessna DC-6 earned certification on the same day as the stock market crash of 1929, October 29, 1929.

In 1932, the Cessna Aircraft Company closed due to the Great Depression.

However, the Cessna CR-3 custom racer made its first flight in 1933. The plane won the 1933 American Air Race in Chicago and later set a new world speed record for engines smaller than 500 cubic inches by averaging 237 mph (381 km/h).

Cessna's nephews, brothers Dwane and Dwight Wallace, bought the company from Cessna in 1934. They reopened it and began the process of building it into what would become a global success.

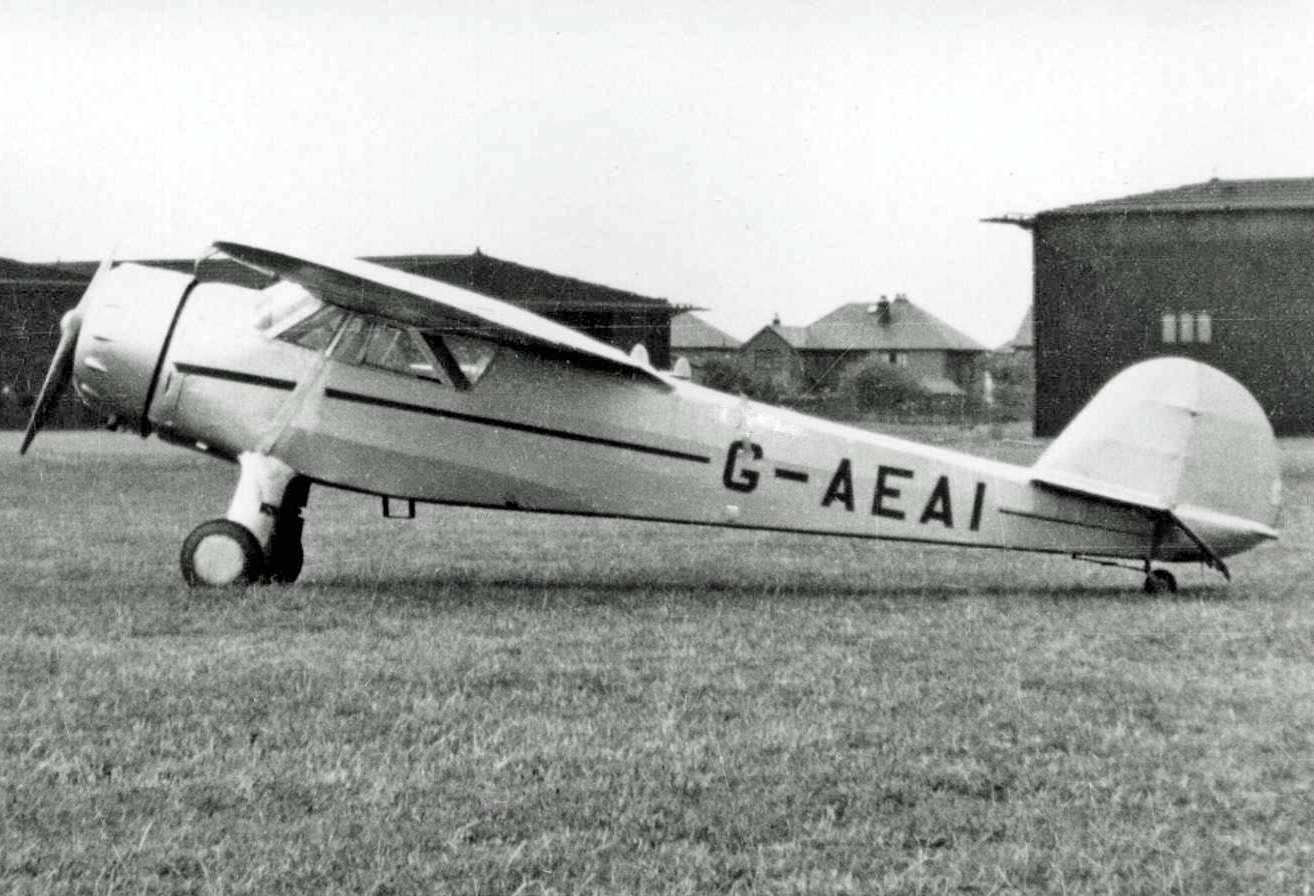
Cessna C-34 at Blackpool (Squires Gate) Airport in 1950

The Cessna C-37 was introduced in 1937 as Cessna's first seaplane when equipped with Edo floats. In 1940, Cessna received their largest order to date, when they signed a contract with the U.S. Army for 33 specially equipped Cessna T-50s, their first twin engine plane. Later in 1940, the Royal Canadian Air Force placed an order for 180 T-50s.

=== Postwar boom ===
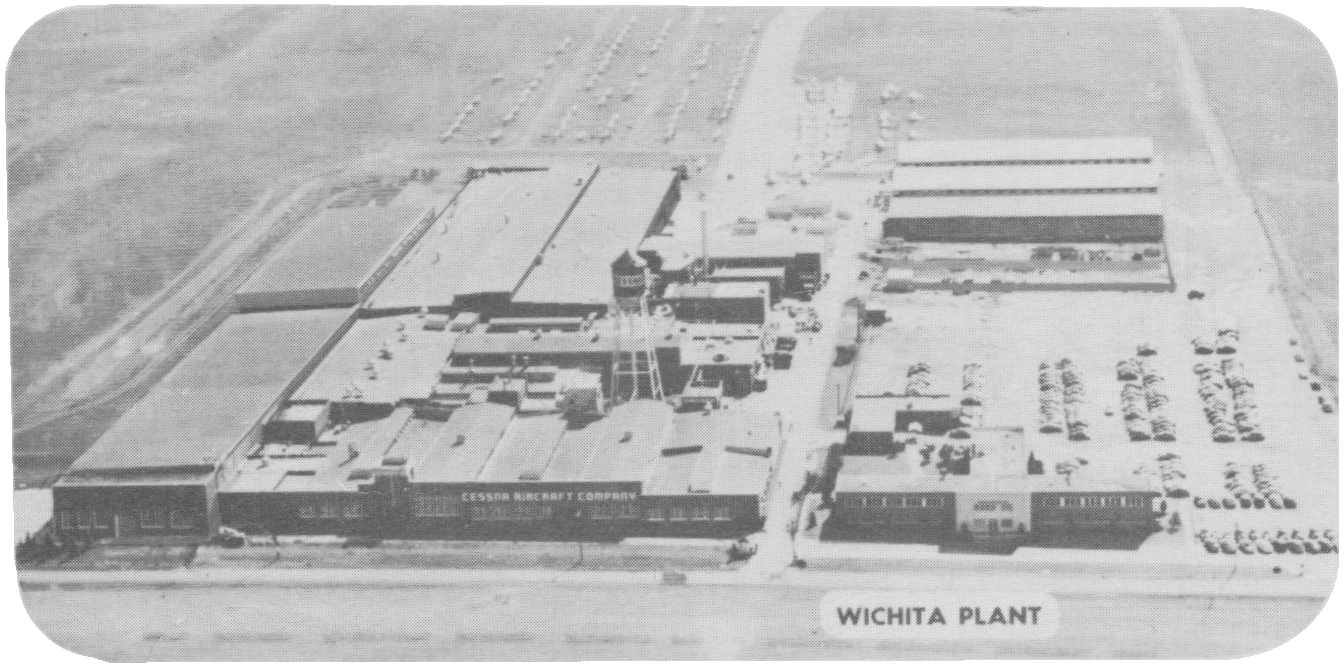
Main Cessna plant in Wichita, Kansas, circa 1954

Cessna returned to commercial production in 1946, after the revocation of wartime production restrictions (L-48), with the release of the Model 120 and Model 140. The approach was to introduce a new line of all-metal aircraft that used production tools, dies and jigs, rather than the hand-built tube-and-fabric construction process used before the war.

The Model 140 was named by the US Flight Instructors Association as the "Outstanding Plane of the Year" in 1948.

Cessna's first helicopter, the Cessna CH-1, received FAA type certification in 1955.

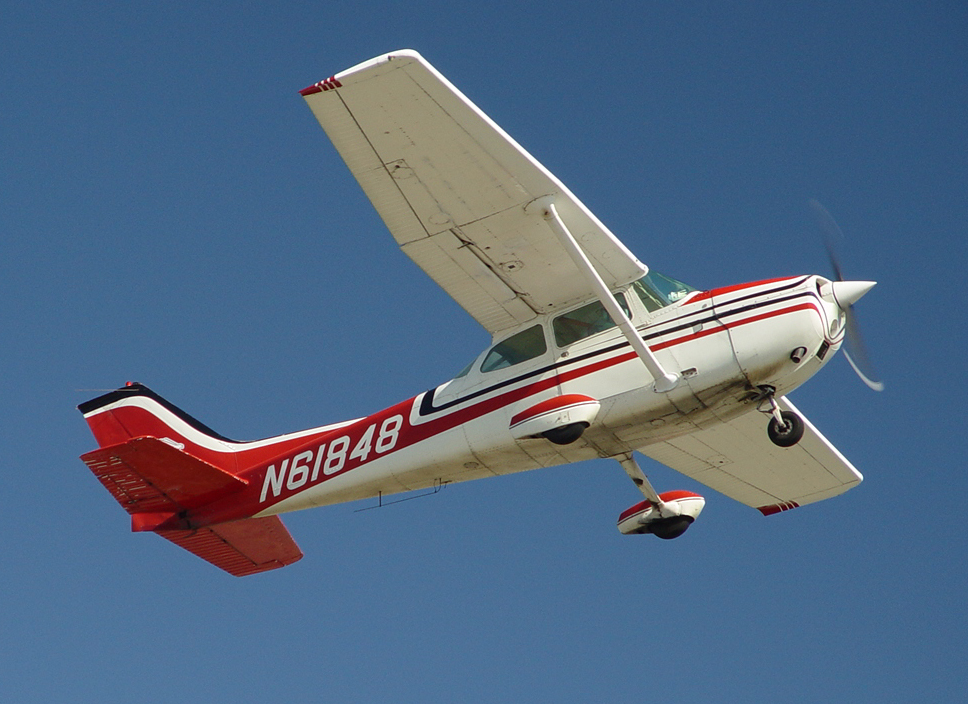
Cessna 172

Cessna introduced the Cessna 172 in 1956. It became the most produced airplane in history. During the post-World War II era, Cessna was known as one of the "Big Three" in general aviation aircraft manufacturing, along with Piper and Beechcraft.

In 1959, Cessna acquired Aircraft Radio Corporation (ARC), of Boonton, New Jersey, a leading manufacturer of aircraft radios. During these years, Cessna expanded the ARC product line, and rebranded ARC radios as "Cessna" radios, making them the "factory option" for avionics in new Cessnas. However, during this time, ARC radios suffered a severe decline in quality and popularity. Cessna kept ARC as a subsidiary until 1983, selling it to avionics-maker Sperry.

In 1960, Cessna acquired McCauley Industrial Corporation, of Ohio, a leading manufacturer of propellers for light aircraft. McCauley became the world's leading producer of general aviation aircraft propellers, largely through their installation on Cessna airplanes.

In 1960, Cessna affiliated itself with Reims Aviation of Reims, France. In 1963, Cessna produced its 50,000th airplane, a Cessna 172.

Cessna's first business jet, the Cessna Citation I, performed its maiden flight on September 15, 1969.

Cessna produced its 100,000th single-engine airplane in 1975.

In 1985, Cessna ceased to be an independent company. It was purchased by General Dynamics. Production of the Cessna Caravan began. General Dynamics in turn sold Cessna to Textron in 1992.

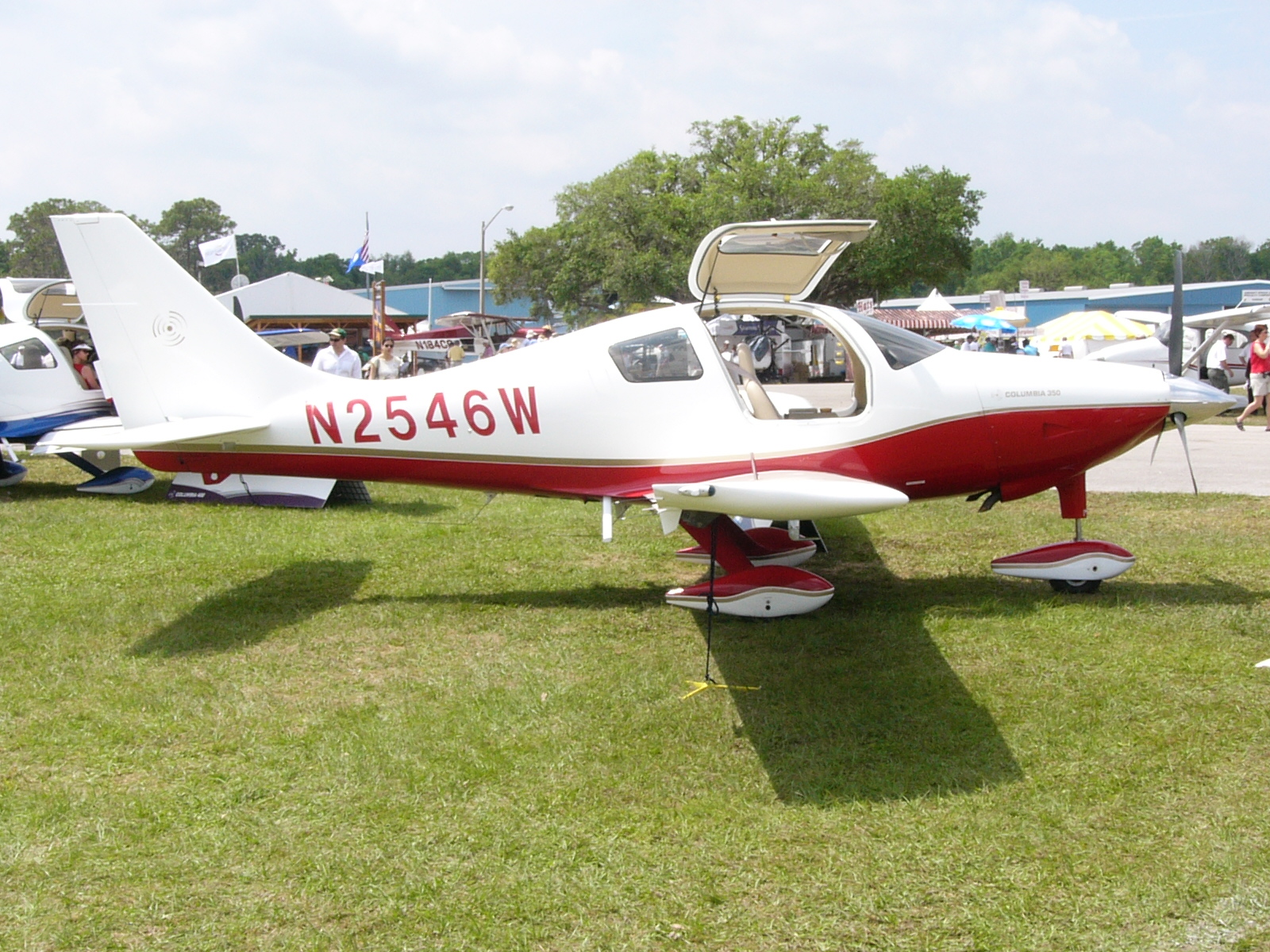
Columbia-designed Cessna 350

Late in 2007, Cessna purchased the bankrupt Columbia Aircraft company for US$26.4M and would continue production of the Columbia 350 and 400 as the Cessna 350 and Cessna 400 at the Columbia factory in Bend, Oregon. However, production of both aircraft had ended by 2018.

=== Chinese production controversy ===
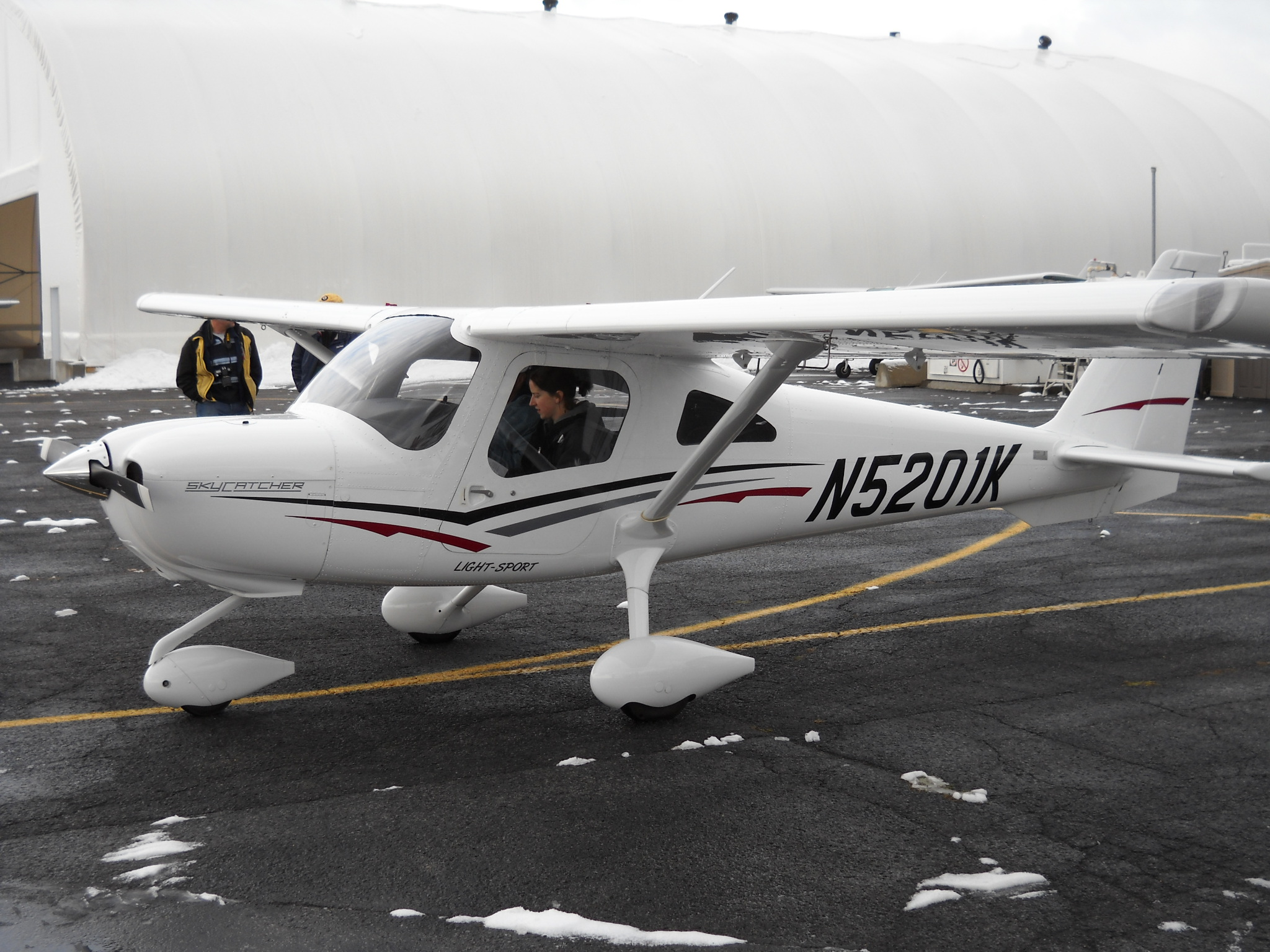
Cessna 162 Skycatcher

On November 27, 2007, Cessna announced the then-new Cessna 162 would be built in China by Shenyang Aircraft Corporation, which is a subsidiary of the China Aviation Industry Corporation I (AVIC I), a Chinese government-owned consortium of aircraft manufacturers. Cessna reported that the decision was made to save money and because the company had no more plant capacity in the United States at the time. Cessna received much negative feedback for this decision, with complaints centering on the recent quality problems with Chinese production of other consumer products, China's human rights record, exporting of jobs and China's less than friendly political relationship with the United States. The customer backlash surprised Cessna and resulted in a company public relations campaign. In early 2009, the company attracted further criticism for continuing plans to build the 162 in China while laying off large numbers of workers in the United States. In the end, the Cessna 162 was not a commercial success and only a small number were delivered before production was cancelled.

=== 2008–2010 economic crisis ===
The company's business suffered notably during the late-2000s recession, laying off more than half its workforce between January 2009 and September 2010.

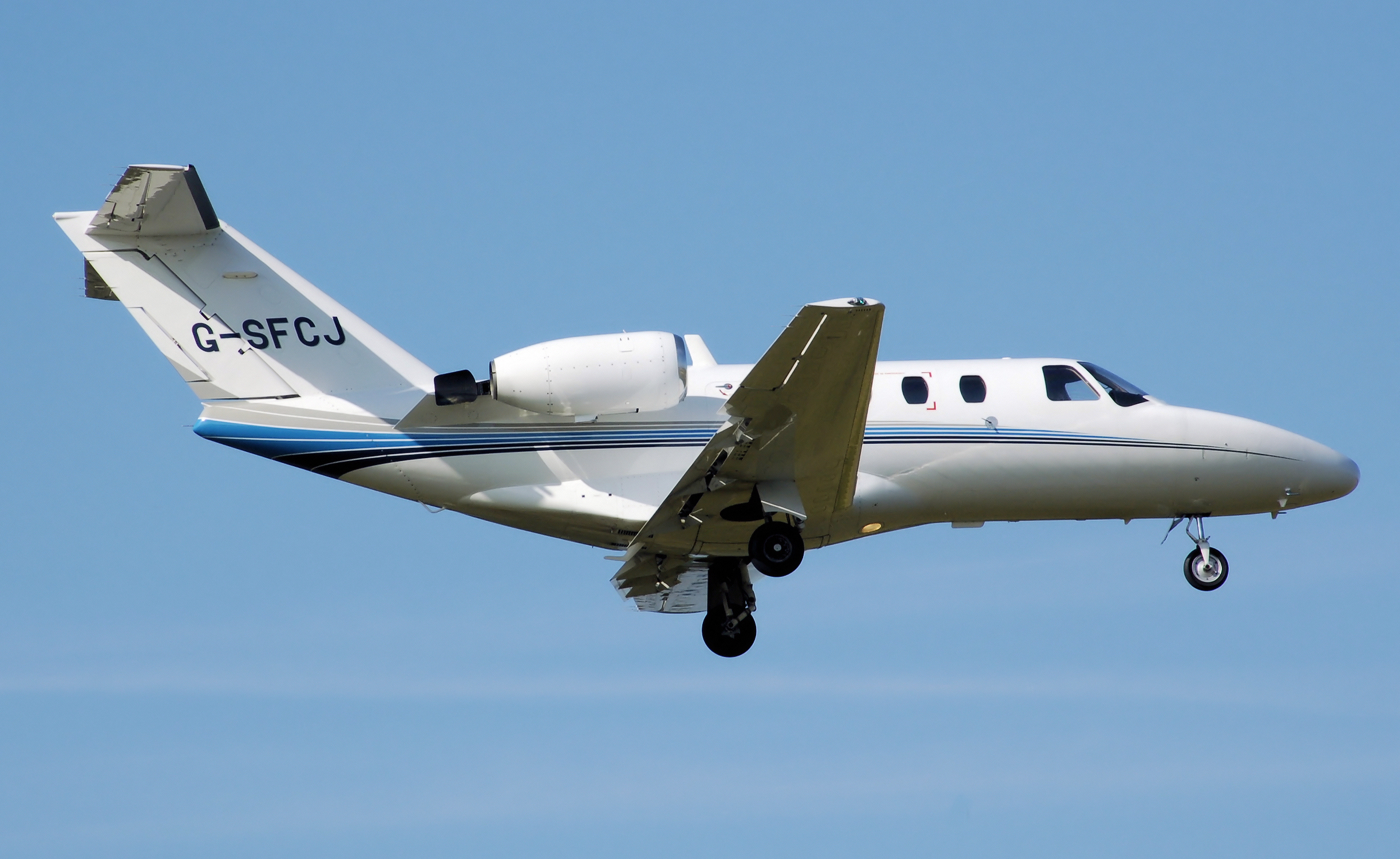
Cessna 525 CitationJet

On November 4, 2008, Cessna's parent company, Textron, indicated that Citation production would be reduced from the original 2009 target of 535 "due to continued softening in the global economic environment" and that this would result in an undetermined number of lay-offs at Cessna.

On November 8, 2008, at the Aircraft Owners and Pilots Association (AOPA) Expo, CEO Jack Pelton indicated that sales of Cessna aircraft to individual buyers had fallen, but piston and turboprop sales to businesses had not. "While the economic slowdown has created a difficult business environment, we are encouraged by brisk activity from new and existing propeller fleet operators placing almost 200 orders for 2009 production aircraft," Pelton stated.

Beginning in January 2009, a total of 665 jobs were cut at Cessna's Wichita and Bend, Oregon, plants. The Cessna factory at Independence, Kansas, which builds the Cessna piston-engined aircraft and the Cessna Mustang, did not see any layoffs, but one third of the workforce at the former Columbia Aircraft facility in Bend was laid off. This included 165 of the 460 employees who built the Cessna 350 and 400. The remaining 500 jobs were eliminated at the main Cessna Wichita plant.

In January 2009, the company laid off an additional 2,000 employees, bringing the total to 4,600. The job cuts included 120 at the Bend, Oregon, facility reducing the plant that built the Cessna 350 and 400 to fewer than half the number of workers that it had when Cessna bought it. Other cuts included 200 at the Independence, Kansas, plant that builds the single-engined Cessnas and the Mustang, reducing that facility to 1,300 workers.

On April 29, 2009, the company suspended the Citation Columbus program and closed the Bend, Oregon, facility. The Columbus program was finally cancelled in early July 2009. The company reported, "Upon additional analysis of the business jet market related to this product offering, we decided to formally cancel further development of the Citation Columbus". With the 350 and 400 production moving to Kansas, the company indicated that it would lay off 1,600 more workers, including the remaining 150 employees at the Bend plant and up to 700 workers from the Columbus program.

In early June 2009, Cessna laid off an additional 700 salaried employees, bringing the total number of lay-offs to 7,600, which was more than half the company's workers at the time.

The company closed its three Columbus, Georgia, manufacturing facilities between June 2010 and December 2011. The closures included the new 100,000-square-foot (9,300 m^{2}) facility that was opened in August 2008 at a cost of US$25M, plus the McCauley Propeller Systems plant. These closures resulted in total job losses of 600 in Georgia. Some of the work was relocated to Cessna's Independence, Kansas, or Mexican facilities.

Cessna's parent company, Textron, posted a loss of US$8M in the first quarter of 2010, largely driven by continuing low sales at Cessna, which were down 44%. Half of Cessna's workforce remained laid-off and CEO Jack Pelton stated that he expected the recovery to be long and slow.

In September 2010, a further 700 employees were laid off, bringing the total to 8,000 jobs lost. CEO Jack Pelton indicated this round of layoffs was due to a "stalled [and] lackluster economy" and noted that while the number of orders cancelled for jets had been decreasing, new orders had not met expectations. Pelton added, "our strategy is to defend and protect our current markets while investing in products and services to secure our future, but we can do this only if we succeed in restructuring our processes and reducing our costs."

=== 2010s ===
On May 2, 2011, CEO Jack J. Pelton retired. The new CEO, Scott A. Ernest, started on May 31, 2011. Ernest joined Textron after 29 years at General Electric, where he had most recently served as vice president and general manager, global supply chain for GE Aviation. Ernest previously worked for Textron CEO Scott Donnelly when both worked at General Electric.

In September 2011, the Federal Aviation Administration (FAA) proposed a US$2.4 million fine against the company for its failure to follow quality assurance requirements while producing fiberglass components at its plant in Chihuahua, Mexico. Excess humidity meant that the parts did not cure correctly and quality assurance did not detect the problems. The failure to follow procedures resulted in the delamination in flight of a 7 ft (2.1 m) section of one Cessna 400's wing skin from the spar while the aircraft was being flown by an FAA test pilot. The aircraft was landed safely. The FAA also discovered 82 other aircraft parts that had been incorrectly made and not detected by the company's quality assurance. The investigation resulted in an emergency Airworthiness Directive that affected 13 Cessna 400s.

Since March 2012, Cessna has been pursuing building business jets in China as part of a joint venture with Aviation Industry Corporation of China (AVIC). The company stated that it intends to eventually build all aircraft models in China, saying "The agreements together pave the way for a range of business jets, utility single-engine turboprops and single-engine piston aircraft to be manufactured and certified in China."

In late April 2012, the company added 150 workers in Wichita as a result of anticipated increased demand for aircraft production. Overall, they have cut more than 6000 jobs in the Wichita plant since 2009.

In March 2014, Cessna ceased operations as a company and instead became a brand of Textron Aviation.

== Marketing initiatives ==
During the 1950s and 1960s, Cessna's marketing department followed the lead of Detroit automakers and came up with many unique marketing terms in an effort to differentiate its product line from their competitors.

Other manufacturers and the aviation press widely ridiculed and spoofed many of the marketing terms, but Cessna built and sold more aircraft than any other manufacturer during the boom years of the 1960s and 1970s.

Generally, the names of Cessna models do not follow a theme, but there is usually logic to the numbering: the 100 series are the light singles, the 200s are the heftier, the 300s are light to medium twins, the 400s have "wide oval" cabin-class accommodation and the 500s are jets. Many Cessna models have names starting with C for the sake of alliteration (e.g. Citation, Crusader, Chancellor).

=== Company terminology ===
Cessna marketing terminology includes:

- Para-Lift Flaps – Large Fowler flaps Cessna introduced on the 170B in 1952, replacing the narrow chord plain flaps then in use.
- Land-O-Matic – In 1956, Cessna introduced sprung-steel tricycle landing gear on the 172. The marketing department chose "Land-O-Matic" to imply that these aircraft were much easier to land and take off than the preceding conventional landing gear equipped Cessna 170. They even went as far as to say pilots could do "drive-up take-offs and drive-in landings", implying that flying these aircraft was as easy as driving a car. In later years, some Cessna models had their steel sprung landing gear replaced with steel tube gear legs. The 206 retains the original spring steel landing gear today.

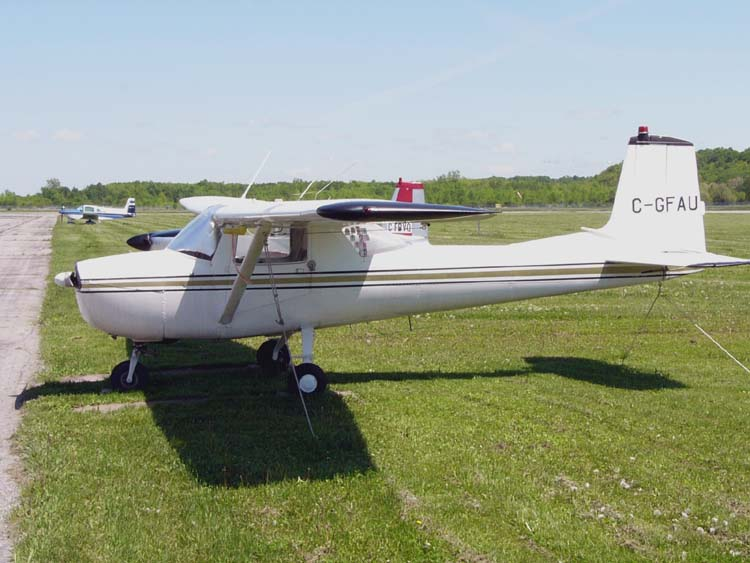
1965 Cessna 150 with "omni-vision" rear windows

- Omni-Vision – The rear windows on some Cessna singles, starting with the 182 and 210 in 1962 and followed by the 172 and 150 in 1963 and 1964 respectively. The term was intended to make the pilot feel visibility was improved on the notably poor-visibility Cessna line. The introduction of the rear window caused in most models a loss of cruise speed due to the extra drag, while not adding any useful visibility.
- Cushioned Power – The rubber mounts on the cowling of the 1967 model 150, in addition to the rubber mounts isolating the engine from the cabin.
- Omni-Flash – The flashing beacon on the tip of the fin that could be seen all around.
- Open-View – This referred to the removal of the top section of the control wheel in 1967 models. These had been rectangular, they now became "ram's horn" shaped, thus not blocking the instrument panel as much.
- Quick-Scan – Cessna introduced a new instrument panel layout in the 1960s and this buzzword was to indicate Cessna's panels were ahead of the competition.
- Nav-O-Matic – The name of the Cessna autopilot system, which implied the system was relatively simple.
- Camber-Lift – A marketing name used to describe Cessna aircraft wings starting in 1972 when the aerodynamics designers at Cessna added a slightly drooped leading edge to the standard NACA 2412 airfoil used on most of the light aircraft fleet. Writer Joe Christy described the name as "stupid" and added "Is there any other kind [of lift]?"
- Stabila-Tip – Cessna started commonly using wingtip fuel tanks, carefully shaped for aerodynamic effect rather than being tubular-shaped. Tip tanks do have an advantage of reducing free surface effect of fuel affecting the balance of the aircraft in rolling maneuvers.

== Aircraft ==
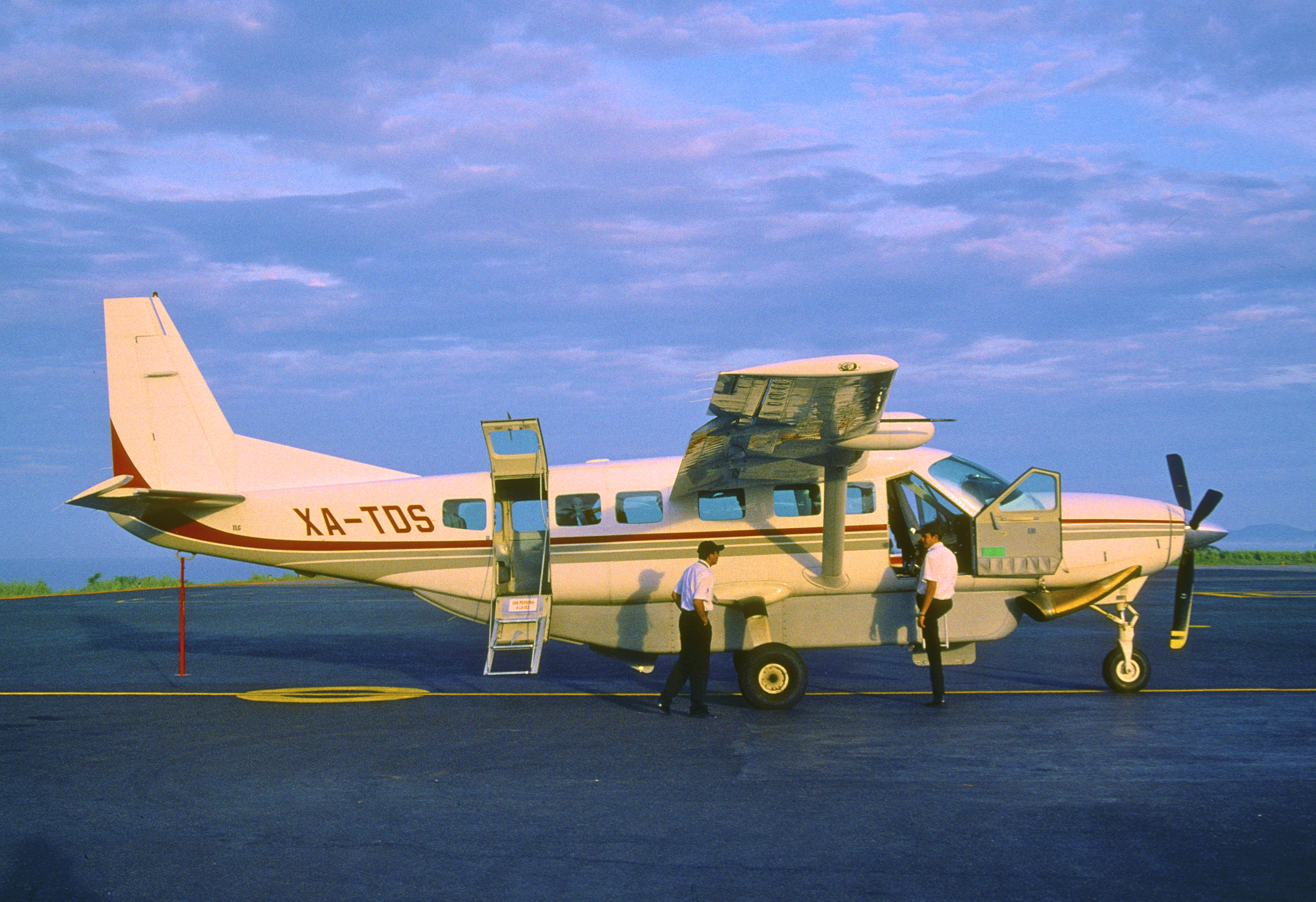
1986 Cessna 208B Grand Caravan

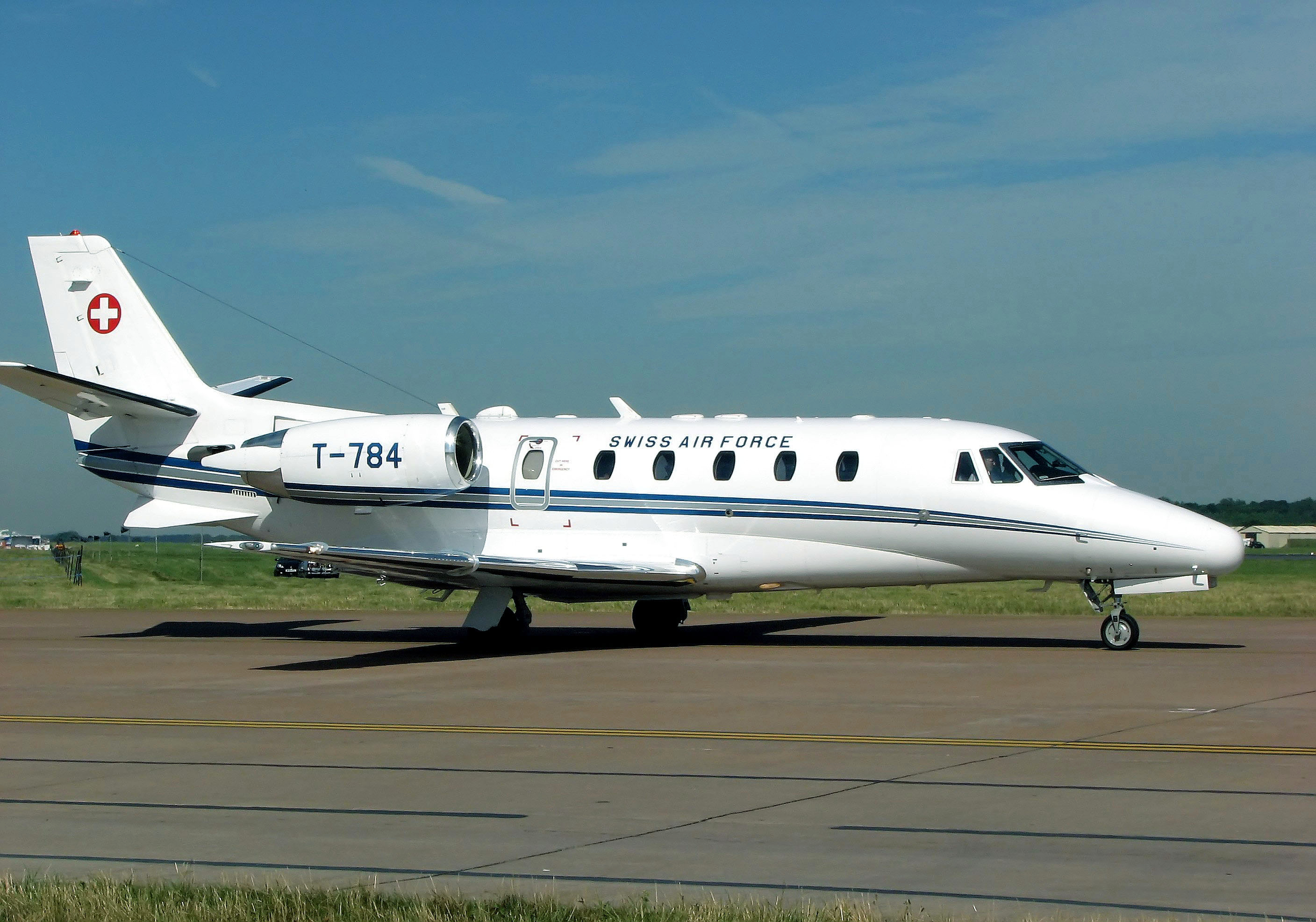
1996 Cessna 560XL Citation Excel of the Swiss Air Force

In October 2020, Textron Aviation was producing the following Cessna-branded models:

- Cessna 172 Skyhawk – high-wing, single piston-engined, four-seat aircraft in production since 1956
- Cessna 182 Skylane – high-wing, single piston-engined, four-seat aircraft in production since 1956
- Cessna 206 Stationair – high-wing, single piston-engined, six-seat utility aircraft in production since 1962
- Cessna 208 Caravan – high-wing single-turboprop utility aircraft in production since 1984
- Cessna 408 SkyCourier – high-wing twin-turboprop utility aircraft in production since 2022
- Cessna Citation family – twin-engined business jets
  - Cessna Citation 525 M2/CJ series – in production since 1991
  - Cessna Citation 560XL Excel – in production since 1996
  - Cessna Citation 680 Sovereign – out of production since 2021
  - Cessna Citation 680A Latitude – in production since 2014
  - Cessna Citation 700 Longitude – in production since 2019
