= Continental IO-550 =

American piston aircraft engine

IO-550
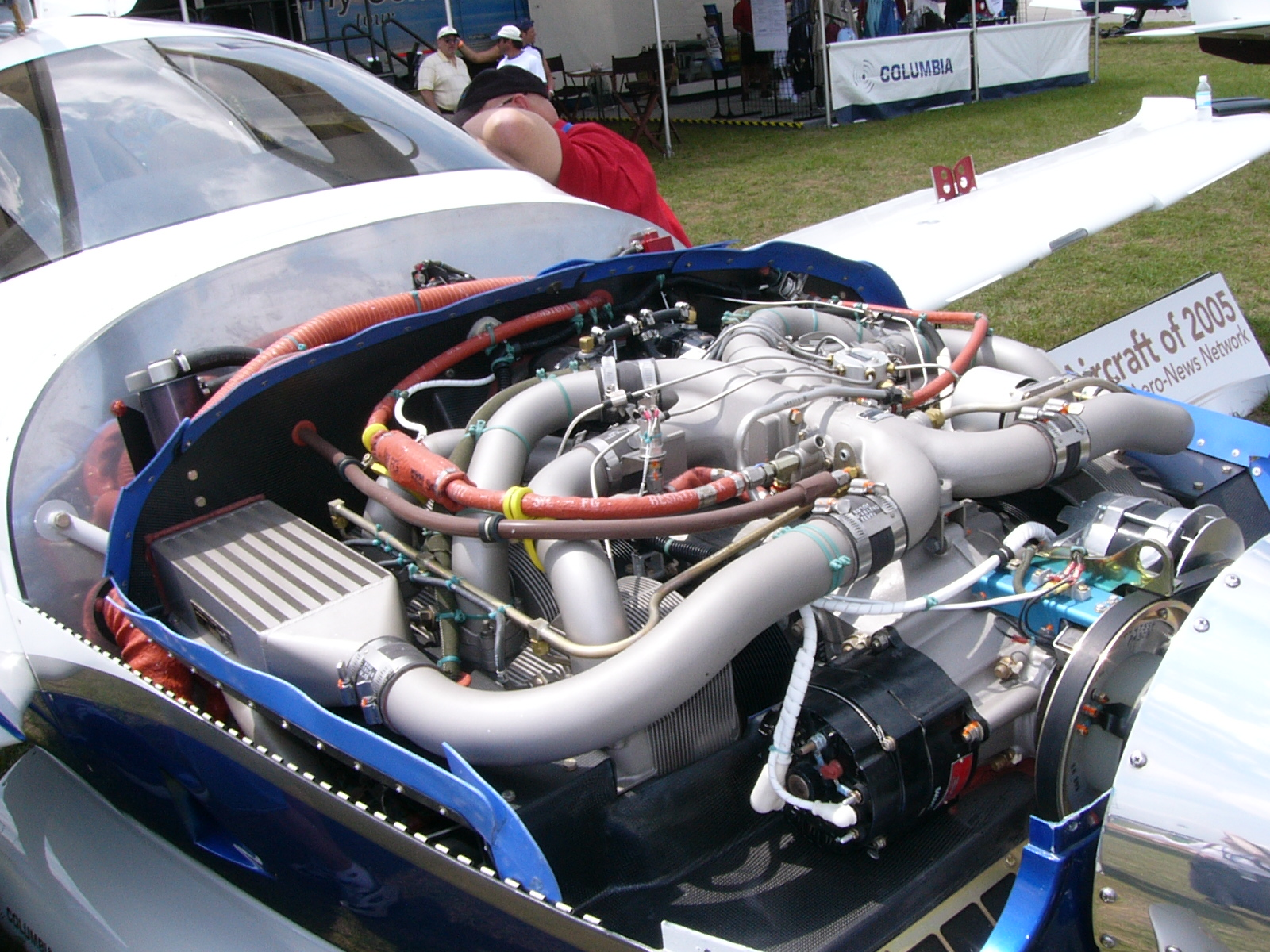
- Continental TSIO-550-C engine installation in a Cessna 400
- Type: Piston aircraft engine
- National origin: United States
- Manufacturer: Teledyne Continental Motors
- First run: 1983
- Major applications: Velocity XL; Cirrus SR22; Cessna TTx; Cessna 185; Mooney M20; Bellanca Viking; Beechcraft Baron; Beechcraft Bonanza
- Manufactured: 1983–present
- Developed from: Continental O-520

The Continental IO-550 engine is a large family of 9-liter fuel-injected six-cylinder, horizontally opposed, air-cooled aircraft engines that were developed for use in light aircraft by Teledyne Continental Motors (now Continental Aerospace Technologies). The first IO-550 was delivered in 1983 and the type remains in production.

The IOF-550 is an Aerosance FADEC equipped version of the same basic engine, the TSIO-550 is a dual turbocharged version and the TSIOL-550 is a liquid-cooled variant.

There is no O-550 engine, which would be a carburetor-equipped variant, hence the base model is the IO-550.

This engine family competes with the Lycoming IO-580 series which are also six-cylinder engines with similar power output and weight.

== Design and development ==
The IO-550 family of engines was developed from the IO-520 series, with the stroke increased from 4 to 4.25 in (102 to 108 mm), increasing the displacement to 552 in³ (9.05 L). The engine family covers a power range from 280 hp (210 kW) to 360 hp (270 kW).

The engines were first developed in the early 1980s and first certified on a regulatory basis of FAR 33, 1 February 1965 amendment, 33-8, 2 May 1977. The first IO-550 model was certified on 13 October 1983.

== Variants ==
IO-550-A
300 hp (220 kW) at 2700 rpm, dry weight 430.72 lb (195.37 kg). Certified 13 October 1983.
IO-550-B
300 hp (220 kW) at 2700 rpm, dry weight 421.61 lb (191.24 kg). Certified 13 October 1983.
IO-550-C
300 hp (220 kW) at 2700 rpm, dry weight 433.20 lb (196.50 kg). Certified 13 October 1983.
IO-550-D
300 hp (220 kW) at 2700 rpm, dry weight 437.1 lb (198.3 kg). Certified 23 June 1988.
IO-550-E
300 hp (220 kW) at 2700 rpm, dry weight 450.50 lb (204.34 kg). Certified 20 December 1989.
IO-550-F
300 hp (220 kW) at 2700 rpm, dry weight 437.1 lb (198.3 kg). Similar to the IO-550-A, B & C, with a top-mounted induction system and 12 US qt (11 L) oil sump. Certified 23 June 1988.
IO-550-G
280 hp (210 kW) at 2500 rpm, dry weight 428.97 lb (194.58 kg). Certified 17 March 1989.
IO-550-L
300 hp (220 kW) at 2700 rpm, dry weight 438.5 lb (198.9 kg). Certified 23 June 1988.
IO-550-N
310 hp (230 kW) at 2700 rpm, dry weight 429.97 lb (195.03 kg). Similar to the IO-550-G with increased power rating. Certified 16 August 1996.
IO-550-P
310 hp (230 kW) at 2700 rpm, dry weight 429 lb (195 kg). Similar to the IO-550-N with oil sump from the IO-550-L. Certified 1 March 2000.
IO-550-R
310 hp (230 kW) at 2700 rpm, dry weight 439.5 lb (199.4 kg). Similar to the IO-550-N, but with the oil sump, oil suction tube and mount legs from the IO-550-B. Certified 1 March 2000.

=== FADEC models ===
IOF-550-B
300 hp (220 kW) at 2700 rpm, dry weight 447.1 lb (202.8 kg). Similar to the IO-550-B with an Aerosance FADEC fuel and ignition control system. Certified 4 February 2002.
IOF-550-C
300 hp (220 kW) at 2700 rpm, dry weight 453.2 lb (205.6 kg). Similar to the IO-550-C with an Aerosance FADEC fuel and ignition control system. Certified 4 February 2002.
IOF-550-D
300 hp (220 kW) at 2700 rpm, dry weight 455.0 lb (206.4 kg). Similar to the IO-550-D with an Aerosance FADEC fuel and ignition control system. Certified 4 February 2002.
IOF-550-E
300 hp (220 kW) at 2700 rpm, dry weight 462.8 lb (209.9 kg). Similar to the IO-550-E with an Aerosance FADEC fuel and ignition control system. Certified 4 February 2002.
IOF-550-F
300 hp (220 kW) at 2700 rpm, dry weight 460.1 lb (208.7 kg). Similar to the IO-550-F with an Aerosance FADEC fuel and ignition control system. Certified 4 February 2002.
IOF-550-L
300 hp (220 kW) at 2700 rpm, dry weight 455.0 lb (206.4 kg). Similar to the IO-550-L with an Aerosance FADEC fuel and ignition control system. Certified 4 February 2002.
IOF-550-N
310 hp (230 kW) at 2700 rpm, dry weight 460.0 lb (208.7 kg). Similar to the IO-550-N with an Aerosance FADEC fuel and ignition control system. Certified 4 February 2002.
IOF-550-P
310 hp (230 kW) at 2700 rpm, dry weight 460.0 lb (208.7 kg). Similar to the IO-550-P with an Aerosance FADEC fuel and ignition control system. Certified 4 February 2002.
IOF-550-R
310 hp (230 kW) at 2700 rpm, dry weight 470.5 lb (213.4 kg). Similar to the IO-550-R with an Aerosance FADEC fuel and ignition control system. Certified 4 February 2002.

=== Turbocharged models ===
TSIO-550-A
360 hp (270 kW) at 2600 rpm, dry weight 442 lb (200 kg) plus two turbochargers of 28.2 lb (12.8 kg) each.
TSIO-550-B
350 hp (260 kW) at 2700 rpm, dry weight 442 lb (200 kg) plus two turbochargers of 28.2 lb (12.8 kg) each. Similar to the TSIO-550-A except with a 12 quart sump, sonic venturii removed and the two stage fuel pump replaced by a single stage fuel pump.
TSIO-550-C
310 hp (230 kW) at 2600 rpm, dry weight 442 lb (200 kg) plus two turbochargers of 28.2 lb (12.8 kg) each.
TSIO-550-E
350 hp (260 kW) at 2700 rpm, dry weight 442 lb (200 kg) plus two turbochargers of 28.2 lb (12.8 kg) each. Similar to TSIO-550-C with the oil sump and maximum continuous power rating of the TSIO-550-B.
TSIO-550-G
310 hp (230 kW) at 2700 rpm, dry weight 554 lb (251 kg) plus two turbochargers of 28.2 lb (12.8 kg) each. Similar to the TSIO-550-E with smaller surface area intercoolers, different oil sump capacity and power rating.
TSIO-550-K
315 hp (230 kW) at 2500 rpm, dry weight 522 lb (237 kg) plus two turbochargers of 28.2 lb (12.8 kg) each. Similar to the TSIO-550-E with new oil sump and capacity, decreased maximum continuous power, increased turbo boost pressure, decreased engine speed rating and tapered cylinder barrel fins.

=== Turbocharged & FADEC models ===
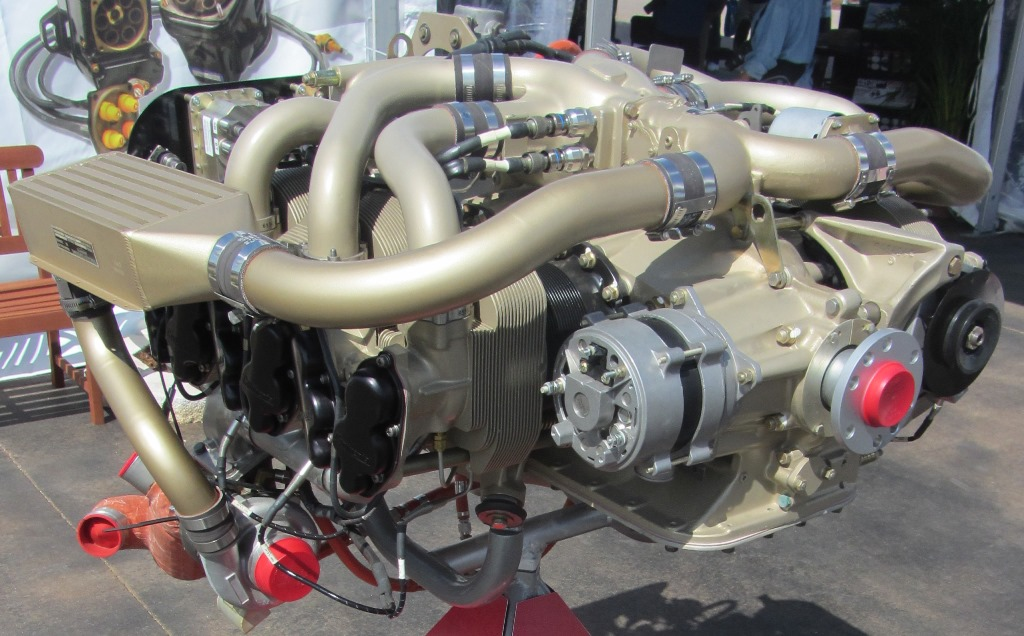
TSIOF-550-D

TSIOF-550-D
350 hp (260 kW) at 2600 rpm, dry weight 558 lb (253 kg) plus two turbochargers of 35.2 lb (16.0 kg) each. Similar to the TSIOF-550-J except the exhaust system and low voltage harness.
TSIOF-550-J
350 hp (260 kW) at 2600 rpm, dry weight 558 lb (253 kg) plus two turbochargers of 35.2 lb (16.0 kg) each. Similar to the TSIO-550-E except for FADEC fuel injection and ignition control, turbochargers, tapered cylinder barrel fins, oil sump and capacity, maximum continuous speed and manifold pressure rating.
TSIOF-550-K
315 hp (235 kW) at 2500 rpm, dry weight 537.3 lb (243.7 kg) plus two turbochargers of 28.2 lb (12.8 kg) each. Similar to the TSIO-550-K, but with FADEC fuel injection and ignition control.

=== Liquid-cooled models ===
TSIOL-550-A
350 hp (260 kW) at 2700 rpm, dry weight 402 lb (182 kg). Similar to the TSIO-520-NB, but with a new cylinder design that uses liquid cooling. The coolant manifold is on top of the cylinder head, with a coolant pump fitted to the starter adapter, driven by the starter adapter shaft and the oil cooler is mounted on the airframe, not the engine. The engine has an AiResearch TA81 turbocharger.
TSIOL-550-B
325 hp (240 kW) at 2700 rpm, dry weight 557 lb (253 kg). Similar to the TSIO-520-UB, but with a new cylinder design that uses liquid cooling. The coolant manifold is on top of the cylinder head, with a coolant pump fitted to the starter adapter, driven by the propeller shaft using sheaves, the oil cooler is mounted on the airframe, not the engine. A coolant tank and coolant lines are added to the installation. The engine has an AiResearch TS06 turbocharger.
TSIOL-550-C
350 hp (260 kW) at 2600 rpm, dry weight 546 lb (248 kg). Similar to the TSIOL-550-A, but with the exhaust system and turbocharger bracket from the TSIOL-550-B. The engine is modified to accept the AiResearch TA81 turbocharger. Neither oil nor coolant radiators are provided with the engine.

=== Geared models ===
GIO-550-A
A special non-certified geared engine developed for the Schweizer RU-38 Twin Condor covert reconnaissance aircraft, incorporating 3:2 gear reduction to 2267 rpm.

== Applications ==
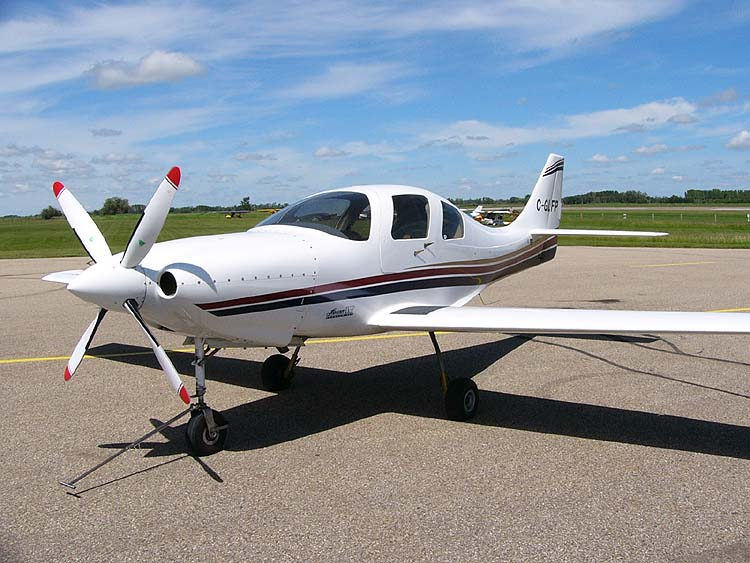
Lancair IV-P equipped with a TSIO-550

IO-550

- Beechcraft Baron
- Beechcraft Bonanza
- Bellanca 17-30
- Cessna 182 (STC SA09133SC, modification)
- Cessna 205 (modification)
- Cessna 206 (modification)
- Cessna 210 (modification)
- Cessna 350
- Cirrus SR22
- Cirrus VK-30
- Freedom Aviation Phoenix
- Lancair Barracuda
- Lancair ES
- Lancair Legacy
- Mooney M20
- Seawind 300C
- Velocity XL-RG
- Washington T-411 Wolverine
- Yakovlev Yak-112

TSIO-550

- Adam A500
- Cessna 400
- Lancair IV
- Mooney M20TN
- Velocity TXL-RG
- Cirrus SR22T

TSIOF-550

- Diamond DA50
- Cobalt Co50 Valkyrie
- KAI KC-100

TSIOL-550

- Extra EA-400
- Viper Aircraft Viperfan

GIO-550

- Schweizer RU-38 Twin Condor

== Specifications (IO-550-A) ==
Data from Type Certificate Data Sheet E3SO.

=== General characteristics ===
- Type: 6-cylinder air-cooled horizontally opposed aircraft piston engine
- Bore: 5.25 in (133.4 mm)
- Stroke: 4.25 in (108.0 mm)
- Displacement: 552 in³ (9.05 L)
- Dry weight: 430.72 lb dry (195.37 kg)

=== Components ===
- Fuel system: TCM fuel injection
- Fuel type: 100LL avgas
- Cooling system: Air-cooled

=== Performance ===
- Power output: 300 hp (224 kW) at 2,700 rpm
- Specific power: 0.54 hp/in³ (24.6 kW/L)
- Compression ratio: 8.5:1
- Power-to-weight ratio: 0.70 hp/lb (1.15 kW/kg)

== See also ==
Comparable engines

- Lycoming O-540
- Lycoming IO-580

Related lists

- List of aircraft engines
