= Cessna 400 =

Single engine general aviation aircraft

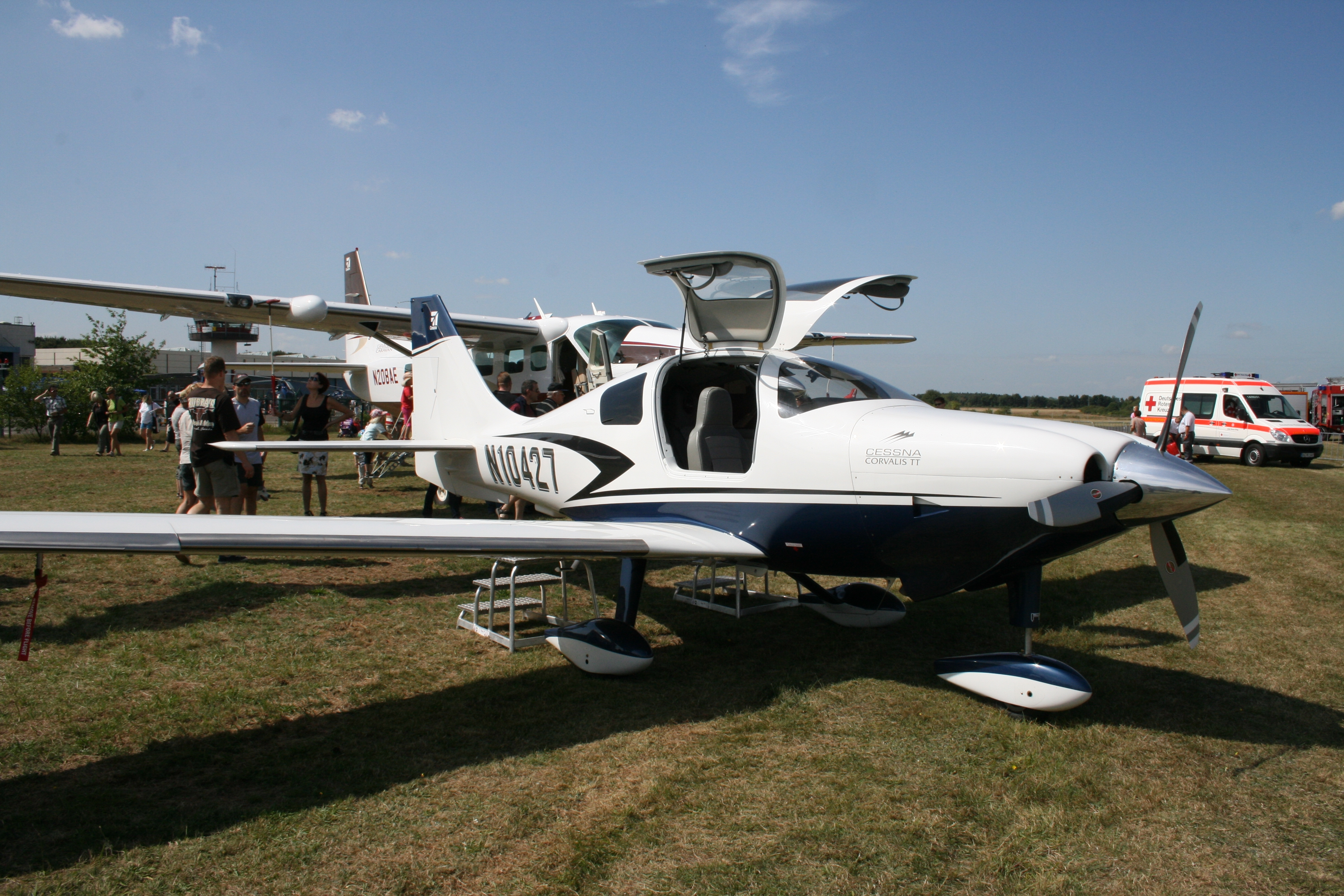

General information
- Type: Civil personal transportation aircraft
- Manufacturer: Columbia; Cessna
- Status: Production completed (February 2018)

History
- Manufactured: 2004–2018
- Introduction date: 2004
- First flight: June 2000
- Developed from: Cessna 350

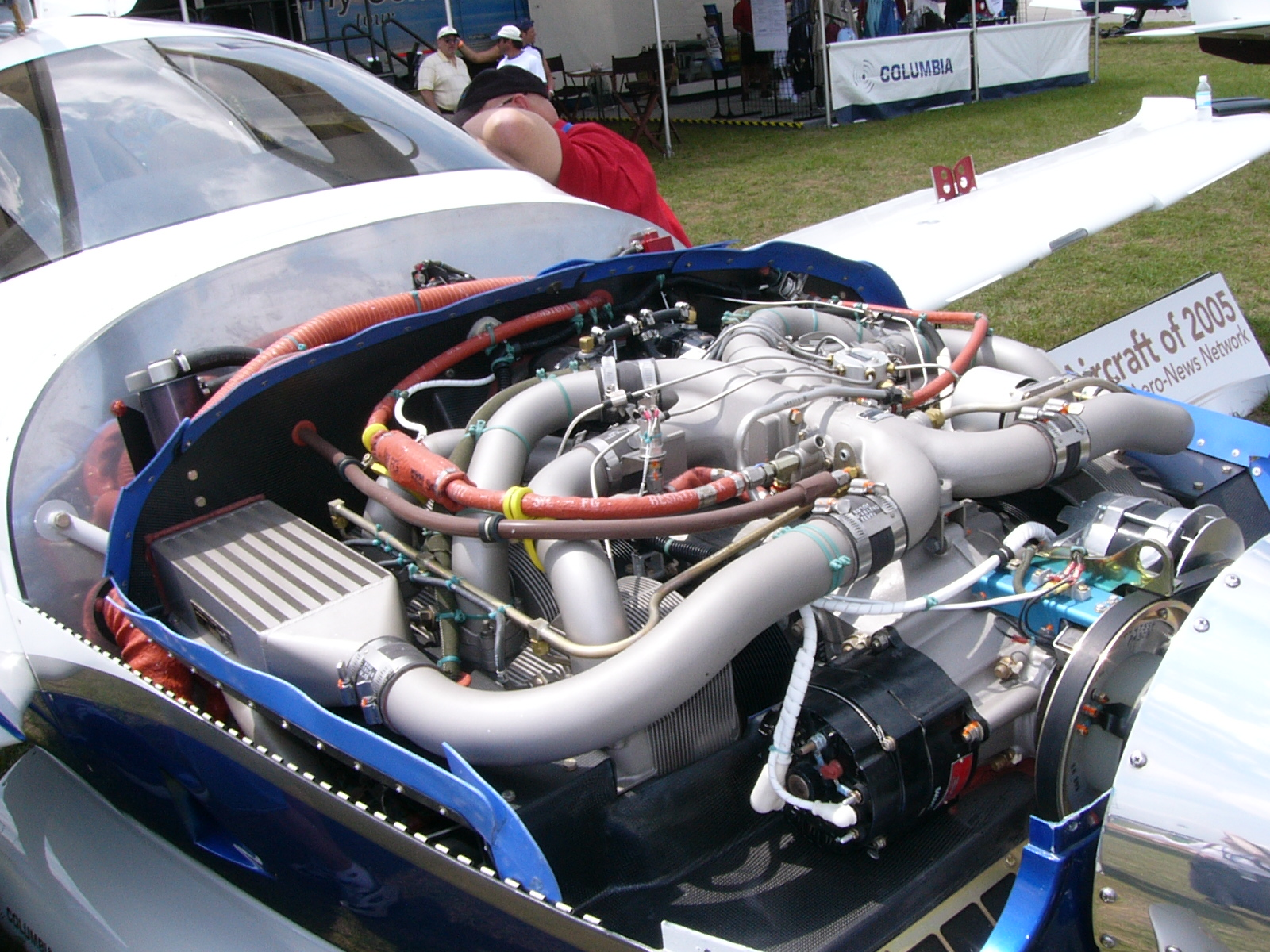
Columbia 400's Continental TSIO-550-C engine installation

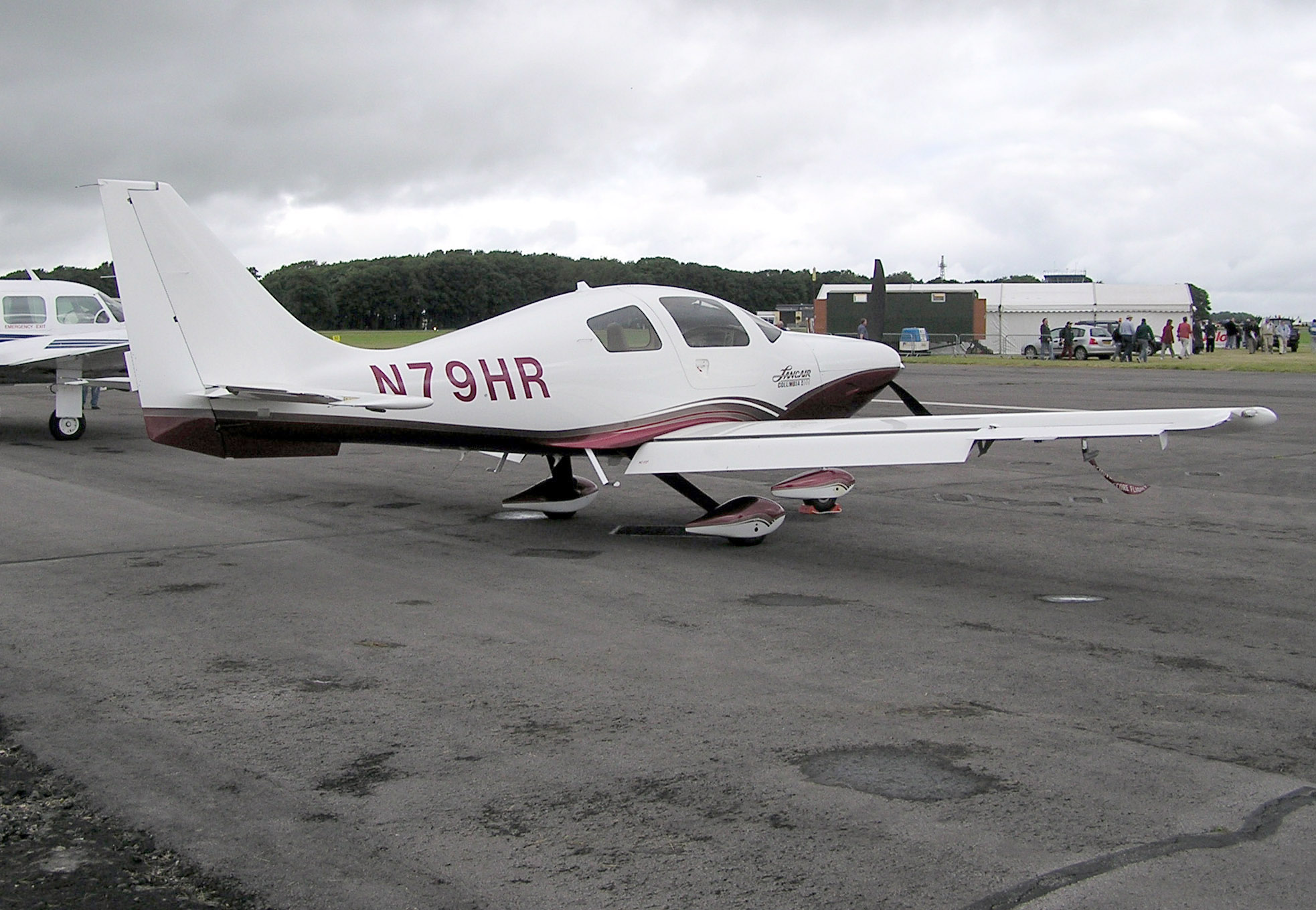
Columbia 400

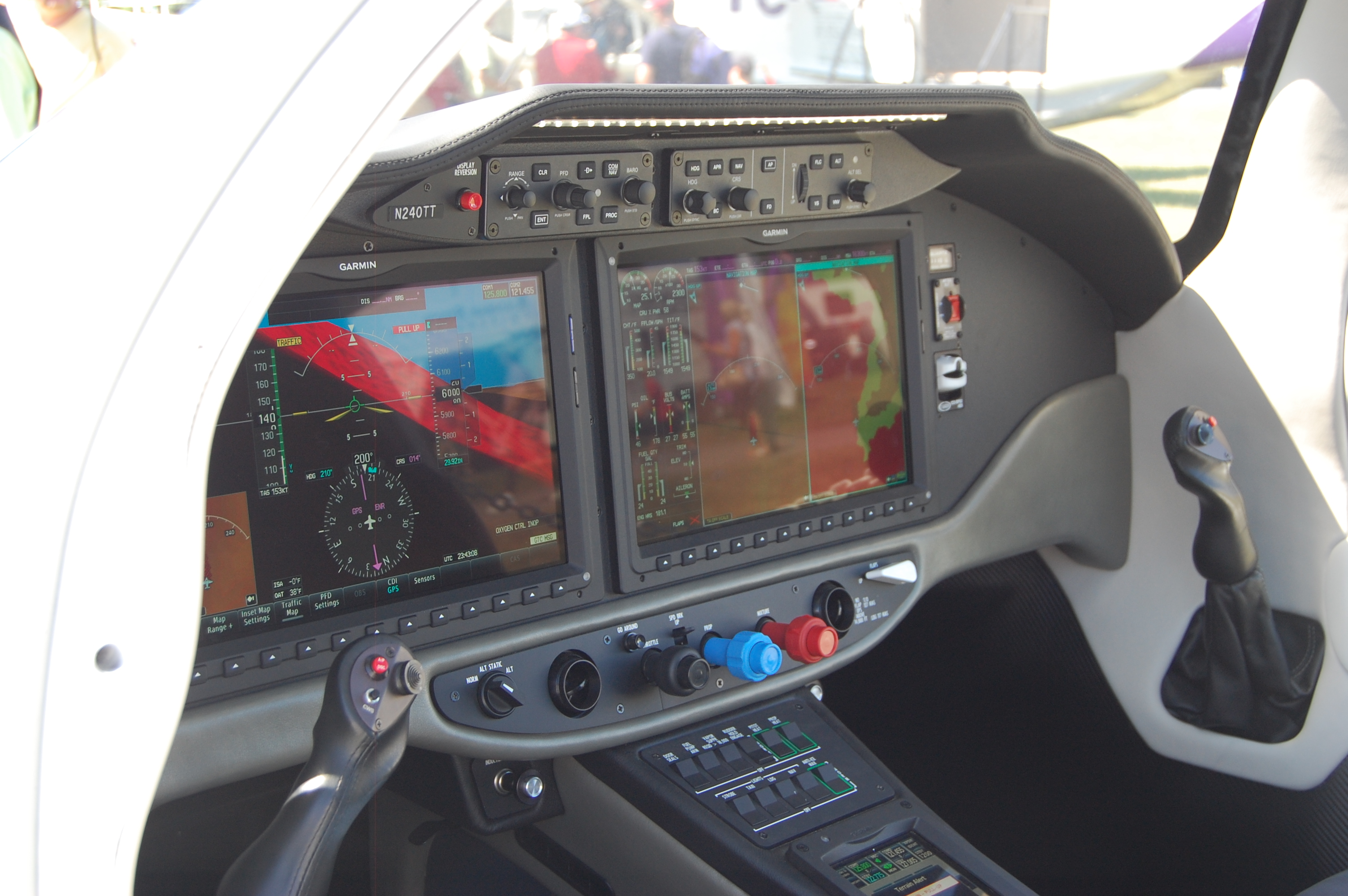
Cessna's mockup of the Corvalis TTx; featuring the Garmin G2000 avionics suite.

The Cessna 400, marketed as the Cessna Corvalis, is a single-engine, fixed-gear, low-wing general aviation aircraft built from composite materials by Cessna Aircraft. The Cessna 400 was originally built by Columbia Aircraft as the Columbia 400 until December 2007. From 2013, the aircraft was built as the Cessna T240 Corvalis TTx.

Cessna 400 production was ended in February 2018.

== Design and development ==
The Cessna 400 was derived from the normally aspirated Columbia 300, which in turn was derived from the Lancair ES kit aircraft.

The 400 is powered by a turbocharged Continental TSIO-550-C engine producing 310 horsepower (230 kW) at 2600 rpm. The 400 features a Garmin G1000 glass cockpit that was later incorporated into the 300 to create the Cessna 350.

The 400's Continental TSIO-550-C engine is capable of being operated lean of peak. Measured in flight at 11,000 feet (3,400 m), 50 °F (28 °C) rich of peak turbine inlet temperature, maximum cruise yielded 199 knots (369 km/h) true air speed and 24.7 US gallons (93 L) per hour fuel flow. At the same operating parameters and 50–75 °F (28–42 °C) lean of peak the 400 was measured at 189 knots (350 km/h) TAS and 17.8 US gal (67 L)/hr (106.8 lb/hr, 67.6 L/h).

The Columbia 400 was marketed with an optional ice protection system, known as E-Vade that was not certified for flight into known icing. The system consists of heat-conducting graphite foil panels on the wing and tail leading edges. These panel areas are heated by 70 volt 100 amp electrical power delivered from a dedicated alternator. The system is controlled by a single switch.

The 400 features optional speedbrakes mounted on the wing's top surfaces.

The 400 nosewheel is not directly steerable; directional control while taxiing is accomplished using differential braking on the mainwheels.

Initially sold simply as the Cessna 400, the aircraft was given the marketing name Corvalis TT for twin turbocharged by Cessna on 14 January 2009. The name is a derivation of the town of Corvallis, Oregon which is west of the Bend, Oregon location of the Cessna plant that built the aircraft, prior to closing the plant and relocating production to Independence, Kansas in 2009.

In April 2009 Cessna announced that it would close the Bend, Oregon factory where the Cessna 400 was produced and move production to Independence, Kansas, with the composite construction moved to Mexico. The production line was restarted in October, 2009 in the Cessna Independence paint facility, at a rate of one aircraft per six months initially. This was to allow the new workers, plus the 30 employees transferred from Bend, to gain experience and also allow Cessna the opportunity to retail its unsold inventory of Cessna 350s and 400s. At that time the company anticipated moving the 350/400 production to a permanent facility by the end of 2009.

In December 2010 a Cessna 400 that was being test flown by an FAA test pilot at the factory developed a fuel leak, the cause of which was determined to be that the aircraft had "suffered a significant structural failure in the wing during a production acceptance flight test. The wing skin disbonded from the upper forward wing spar. The length of the disbond was approximately 7 feet." As a result, the FAA issued an Emergency Airworthiness Directive affecting seven Cessna 400s and one 350, all on the production line. The AD did not affect any customer aircraft in service, but did delay deliveries. In September 2011 the Federal Aviation Administration proposed a US$2.4M fine against the company for its failure to follow quality assurance requirements while producing fiberglass components at its plant in Chihuahua, Mexico. Excess humidity meant that the parts did not cure correctly and quality assurance did not detect the problems. The FAA also discovered 82 other aircraft parts that had been incorrectly made and not detected by the company's quality assurance.

On 29 March 2011 Cessna unveiled several improvements to the Cessna 400 at Sun 'n Fun, designating the new variant the TTx. The aircraft has not been selling well since the late-2000s recession started, with 110 delivered in 2008, the first year Cessna produced the model, 41 in 2009 and just seven sold in 2010. The improved aircraft features a new glass cockpit panel, designed by Cessna and based on the Garmin G2000. Called Intrinzic, it features two 14 in (36 cm) wide high definition displays and a touchscreen controller that uses an infra-red grid to accept touch commands. The updated model also has dual Attitude and Heading Reference Systems, a GFC 700 autopilot, a Garmin GTS800 traffic avoidance system, Garmin GTX 33ES transponder with ADS-B and the Garmin Electronic Stability Protection System, which protects the aircraft from operations outside the approved flight envelope. The new TTx model has no traditional instruments and instead employs the L-3 Trilogy as a back-up. The TTx also features a built-in pulse oximeter, a new paint scheme and a new interior. By the end of Sun 'n Fun 2011 the company indicated it had sold 16 of the new TTx model.

At Sun 'n Fun in March 2012 the company announced that a flight-into-known icing package would be an option on the TTx model. The system will provide up to 2.5 hours icing protection.

The design's production came to an end in February 2018. Sales of the model had been poor, with only 23 examples sold in 2017, compared to its main competitor, the Cirrus SR22, which sold 309 units that same year.

=== Weights ===
The 400's maximum take-off weight is 3600 lbs (1633 kg) and the maximum landing weight is 3420 lbs (1551 kg). A typical empty weight without deicing equipment is 2575 lbs (1168 kg). With a full fuel load this leaves 413 lbs (187 kg) for crew and baggage.

=== Certification ===
The aircraft was originally certified by the Federal Aviation Administration under FAR 23, on April 8, 2004 as the Model LC41-550FG (for Lancair Certified, Model 41, Continental 550 engine, Fixed Gear) and marketed under the designation Columbia 400. EASA certification was added in February 2009.

The Cessna 400 is certified in the Utility Category, with a positive limit maneuvering load factor of 4.4, whereas most comparable aircraft (such as the Cessna 182 and Cirrus SR22) were certified in the Normal Category with a load factor of 3.8.

The 400 has a certified airframe maximum life of 25,200 flight hours.

== Variants ==
Columbia 400
Initial model produced by Columbia Aircraft
Cessna 400 Corvalis TT
Initial Cessna-produced model, TT designating Twin Turbocharged
Cessna T240 Corvalis TTx
Improved Cessna model announced in March 2011, with upgraded avionics and interior. The TTx first flew on 2 March 2013 and is equipped with Garmin G2000 14 avionics and a 310 hp (231 kW) Continental TSIO-550-C. Certification for Flight Into Known Icing (FIKI) was added in June 2014.

== Specifications (Cessna 400) ==
Data from Columbia 400 Pilot's Operating Handbook

General characteristics

- Crew: 1 pilot
- Capacity: 3 passengers
- Length: 25 ft 2 in (7.67 m)
- Wingspan: 36 ft 1 in (11.00 m)
- Height: 9 ft 0 in (2.74 m)
- Wing area: 141 sq ft (13.1 m^{2})
- Empty weight: 2,500 lb (1,134 kg)
- Max takeoff weight: 3,600 lb (1,633 kg)
- Powerplant: 1 × Teledyne Continental TSIO-550-C air-cooled flat-6 engine, 310 hp (230 kW)

Performance

- Maximum speed: 235 kn (270 mph, 435 km/h) calibrated airspeed
- Cruise speed: 235 kn (270 mph, 435 km/h) true airspeed at 25,000 ft (7,600 m)
- Stall speed: 59 kn (68 mph, 109 km/h)
- Range: 1,107 nmi (1,274 mi, 2,050 km)
- Service ceiling: 25,000 ft (7,600 m)
- Rate of climb: 1,500 ft/min (7.6 m/s)

== See also ==
Related development

- Lancair IV

Aircraft of comparable role, configuration, and era

- Beechcraft Bonanza
- Cirrus SR22
- Mooney Acclaim
