= Cessna 350 Corvalis =

American light aircraft design

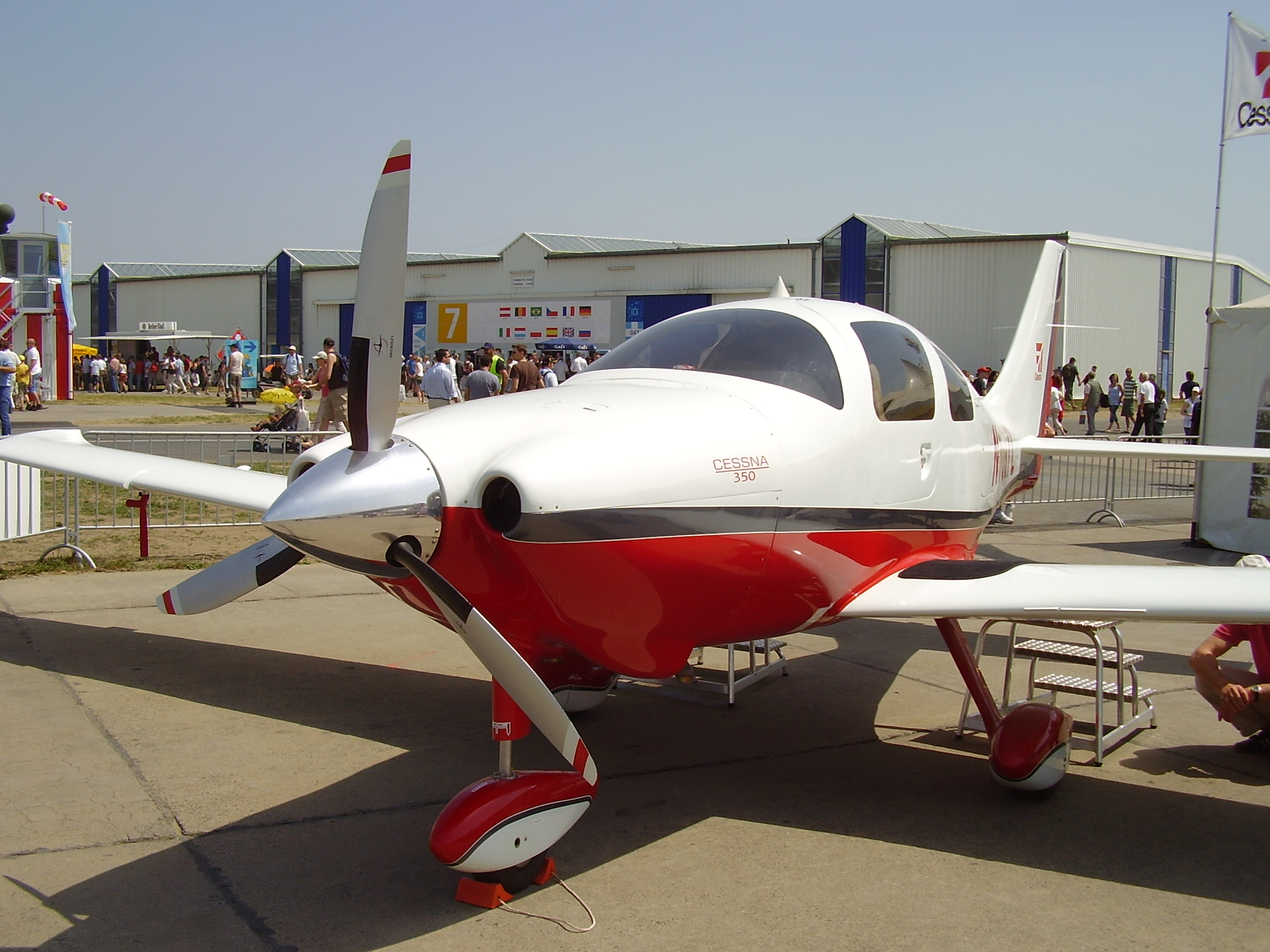

General information
- Type: Personal aircraft
- Manufacturer: Columbia; Cessna
- Status: Production completed 2010

History
- Manufactured: 2000–2010
- First flight: July 1996
- Variants: Cessna 400

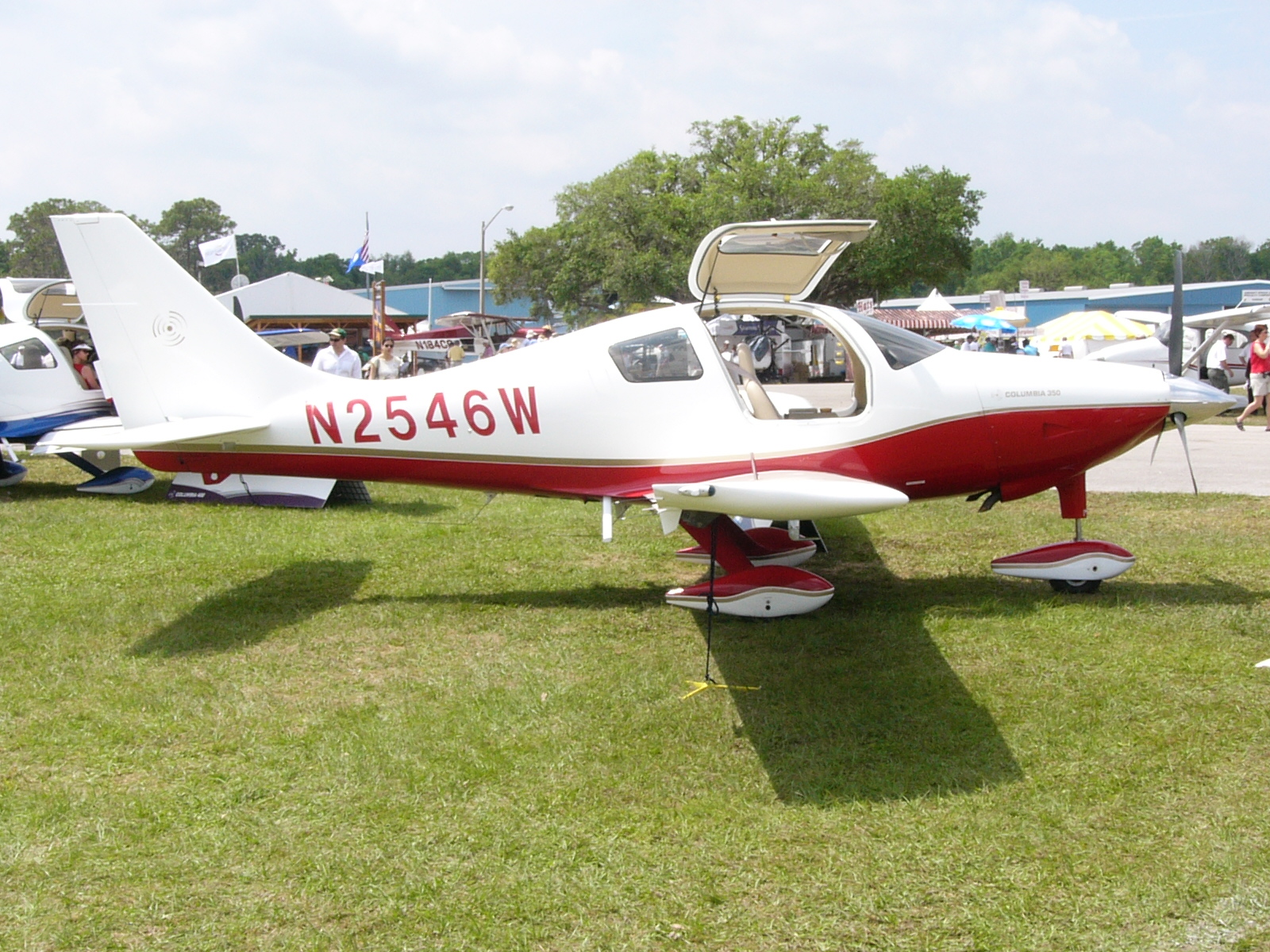
Columbia 350 at Sun 'n Fun 2006

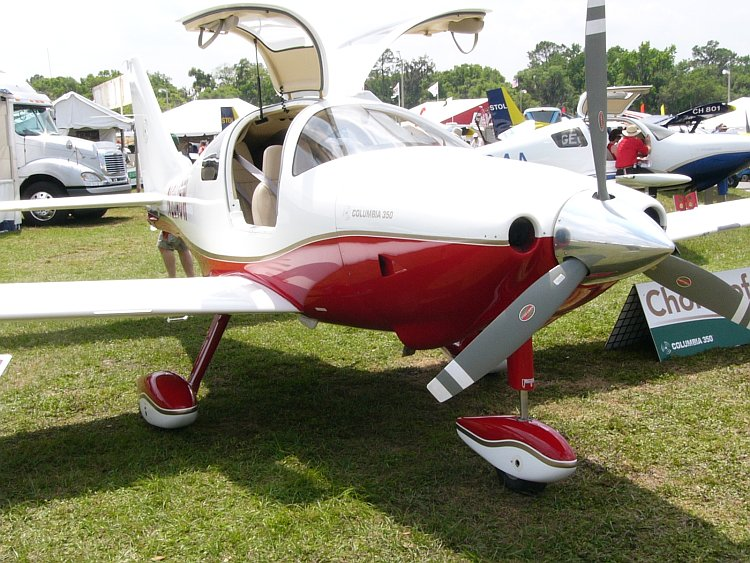
View of the nose of the aircraft

The Cessna 350 Corvalis is a composite construction, single-engine, normally aspirated, fixed-gear, low-wing general aviation aircraft that was built by Cessna Aircraft until the end of 2010.

The aircraft was formerly built by Columbia Aircraft and called the Columbia 350 until late 2007.

== Design and development ==
=== Columbia 300 ===
Developed as the Model LC40-550FG (for Lancair Certified, Model 40, Continental 550 engine, Fixed Gear) and marketed under the name Columbia 300, the aircraft was certified on September 18, 1998. Deliveries began in February 2000.

The 300 is powered by a Teledyne Continental Model IO-550-N engine of 310 horsepower (230 kW) at 2700 rpm. The aircraft's maximum takeoff weight is 3400 lb (1542 kg) and the maximum landing weight is 3230 lb (1465 kg).

The 300 has a certified airframe life of 25,200 flight hours.

=== Columbia 350 ===
The Columbia 300 was upgraded with a glass cockpit and other improvements developed for the turbocharged Columbia 400. It was certified on March 30, 2003 as the Model LC42-550FG (for Lancair Certified, Model 42, Continental 550 engine, Fixed Gear) and marketed as the Columbia 350.

Like the 300, the 350 is powered by a Teledyne Continental IO-550-N powerplant producing 310 horsepower (230 kW) at 2700 rpm. The 350 has the same takeoff and landing weights as the 300; maximum takeoff weight is 3400 lb (1542 kg) and the maximum landing weight is 3230 lb (1465 kg).

Like the 300 and 400, the 350 has a certified airframe life of 25,200 flight hours.

Initially sold simply as the Cessna 350, the aircraft was given the marketing name Corvalis by Cessna on 14 January 2009. The name is a derivation of the town of Corvallis, Oregon, which is west of the Bend, Oregon, location of the Cessna plant that built the aircraft, prior to closing the plant and relocating production to Independence, Kansas, in 2009.

In April 2009, Cessna announced that it would close the Bend, Oregon factory where the Cessna 350 was produced and move production to Independence, Kansas, with the composite construction moved to Mexico. The production line was restarted in October 2009 at the Cessna Independence paint facility, initially at a rate of one aircraft in six months. This was to allow the new workers, plus the 30 employees transferred from Bend, to gain experience and also allow Cessna the opportunity to retail its unsold inventory of Cessna 350s and 400s. The company had anticipated moving the 350/400 production into a permanent facility by the end of 2009.

In December 2010, a Cessna 400 that was being test flown at the factory developed a fuel leak, the cause of which was determined to be that the aircraft had "suffered a significant structural failure in the wing during a production acceptance flight test. The wing skin disbonded from the upper forward wing spar. The length of the disbond was approximately 7 feet." As a result, the FAA issued an Emergency Airworthiness Directive affecting seven Cessna 400s and one 350, all on the production line. The AD did not affect any customer aircraft in service, but did delay deliveries.

In March 2011, Cessna announced that the model was out of production and removed marketing information from its website.

== Specifications (Cessna 350) ==
Data from Cessna Aircraft

General characteristics

- Crew: 1
- Capacity: 3 passengers
- Length: 25 ft 2 in (7.67 m)
- Wingspan: 36 ft 1 in (11.00 m)
- Height: 9 ft 0 in (2.74 m)
- Wing area: 141 sq ft (13.1 m^{2})
- Empty weight: 2,300 lb (1,043 kg)
- Max takeoff weight: 3,400 lb (1,542 kg)
- Powerplant: 1 × Teledyne Continental Motors IO-550-N air-cooled flat-six, 310 hp (230 kW)

Performance

- Maximum speed: 191 kn (220 mph, 354 km/h)
- Range: 1,300 nmi (1,500 mi, 2,400 km)
- Service ceiling: 18,000 ft (5,500 m)
- Rate of climb: 1,500 ft/min (7.6 m/s)
