= J. Patrick Metke =

American politician

- State Representative Pat Metke, 1959

Member of the Oregon House of Representatives from the 27th district
- In office 1959–1960
- Preceded by: Ole W. Grubb
- Succeeded by: Kessler R. Cannon

Personal details
- Born: May 27, 1922 Bend, Oregon, U.S.
- Died: September 8, 2013 (aged 91) Fort Myers, Florida, U.S.
- Party: Republican
- Spouse: Polly Partlow
- Profession: Insurance agent

John Patrick Metke (May 27, 1922 – September 8, 2013), commonly known as Pat Metke, was an American businessman and politician who served as an Oregon state legislator. He was a Republican who served one two-year term in the Oregon House of Representatives. Outside the legislature, Metke was a partner in an insurance agency located in Bend, Oregon. He also served seven years on the Oregon Game Commission, an executive group appointed by the governor to oversee the Oregon Department of Fish and Wildlife.

== Early life ==
Metke was born in Bend, Oregon on May 27, 1922. He was the son of Luther J. Metke and Anna (Dobbs) Metke. His father was born in New York state while his mother was from Ireland. His father settled along the Deschutes River near Bend in 1907. The senior Metke built roads, bridges, and log homes throughout Central Oregon. He also built a number of other structures including the Camp Sherman Community Hall in Camp Sherman, Oregon, which is now listed on the National Register of Historic Places.

Metke grew up in Bend. As a youth, he went to Allen Elementary School and was active in Boy Scouts. He attended Bend High School, where he was student body president during his senior year. He was also the starting quarterback on his high school football team. The Bend High School football team won the Oregon state championship in his senior year. He graduated from high school in 1941 and went on to University of Portland.

At the University of Portland, Metke was elected freshman class president. He was also a member of the university's football team and track and field squad. During the summer he worked for the United States Forest Service fighting wildfires. At the end of his sophomore year, he was elected student body president, to serve in that position during his junior year (the 1943–44 academic year). However, before that academic year began, Metke joined the United States Navy as an aviation cadet and was sent to Wesleyan University in Ohio for pre-flight training.

Metke completed his pre-flight training in December 1943 and was then reassigned to Wenatchee, Washington, for preliminary flight school. After he completed ground school and initial flight training at Wenatchee, the Navy sent him to Saint Mary's College of California for advance flight training. He was then assigned to the aviation cadet regiment at Corpus Christi Naval Air Station in Texas.

Metke was commissioned as an ensign in early 1945. He then began flying anti-submarine patrols in two-engine Navy Venture bombers. He flew patrol missions along both the Atlantic and Pacific coasts. Before he left the Navy, he married Ursula Rose (Polly) Partlow. Their wedding took place on October 4, 1945 in Olympia, Washington.

== Business and civic affairs ==
After leaving the Navy, Metke and his wife moved to Seattle where he worked for an insurance company. In 1948, he moved to Palo Alto, California where the family resided for about a year before returning to Bend.

In 1949, Metke moved his family back to Bend, taking a job with Lumberman's Insurance Company. Once back in Bend, Metke got involved in a wide range of community groups. He joined the Lions Club and the Jaycees. He also became a member of the Knights of Columbus and was an active supporter of the Boy Scouts. In addition, he was the local chairman for Crusade for Freedom campaign in 1950. Metke finished 1950 by being selected as Bend's Junior Citizen of Year for his active support of the local Jaycees, Lions Club and other civic groups.

His community involvement continued to grow throughout the early 1950s. He joined the Central Oregon Hospitals Foundation board of directors in 1951 and was elected president of the Jaycees in 1952. The following year, he was appointed to the local Red Cross board of directors, and the next year, he was elected to the Bend Chamber of Commerce board. In 1955, he became chairman of the County Library board of directors.

Metke became a partner in Lumberman's Insurance Agency in 1955. Metke also got involved in local politics during the 1956 election cycle, serving as the local campaign chairman for a Republican candidate running for the United States Senate.

== State representative ==
In 1958, Metke decided to run as a Republican for the District 27 seat in the Oregon House of Representatives. At that time, District 27 represented Deschutes County in central Oregon. He was unopposed in the Republican primary. In the Democratic primary, the incumbent Ole W. Grubb was also unopposed. In the general election, Metke won by 292 votes. The final tally was 3,859 votes for Metke against 3,567 for Grubb.

Metke took his seat in the Oregon House of Representatives on January 12, 1959, representing District 27. He worked through the 1959 regular legislative session which ended on 6 May. During the session, he served on the financial institutions, fish and wildlife, and forestry and mining committees. He was an active legislator, focusing on economic and education issues. He advocated for funding of vocational training programs at state community colleges. He also introduced a bill that to would allow Oregon counties to determine what proportion of Federal timber harvest payments were used for roads and how much would go to support schools rather than the state's fix formula that favored roads.

After the 1959 legislative session closed, the Speaker of the Oregon House of Representatives appointed Metke to serve on an interim legislative committee chartered to review natural resource issues and related laws and regulations. The committee was directed to make specific recommendations to be introduced as bills during the next legislative session. The Interim natural resources committee held meetings throughout the state on land use, forestry, fish and wildlife, and mining policy issues.

Early in 1960, Metke announced that he would run for the District 17 seat in the state senate. At that time, District 17 represented Crook, Deschutes, Jefferson, and Lake counties in central and southcentral Oregon. Metkre was unopposed in the District 17 Republican primary, which was held in May. The District 17 incumbent, Boyd R. Overhulse of Madras, was unopposed in the Democratic primary. Overhulse won the November general election, receiving 9,614 votes against Metke's 8,876 votes. Metke won the vote in Deschutes and Lake counties, but the margin was not large enough to overcome Overhulse's margin of victory in Crook and Jefferson counties.

== Later life ==
After he left the legislature, Metke returned to his insurance business in Bend. His business continued to thrive. In 1961, the company moved to new offices in downtown Bend. He also remained active in civic affairs and politics, supporting local service groups and backing Republican candidates. For example, just one month after losing the state senate race, Metke was elected president of the Bend Athletic Association. He also continued to be active in the local Lions Club. He remained on the board of directors of the Central Oregon Hospital Foundation and joined the Central Oregon College Foundation board. He became president of the college foundation board in 1964.

In 1962, Metke led the successful Bend Chamber of Commerce effort to get Newberry Crater, south of Bend, designated as the National Aeronautics and Space Administration’s Moon landing simulation site. Later that year, Metke was chairman of the host committee for the state Republican convention that was held in Bend that summer. Over 400 Republican leaders attended.

In 1963, Governor Mark Hatfield appointed Metke to a five-year term on the Oregon Game Commission, a citizens group appointed by the governor to oversee the Oregon Department of Fish and Wildlife. Metke later became chairman of the commission. In 1968, Governor Tom McCall re-appointed Metke to the game commission for a second five-year term. After Metke left the commission in 1973, the Oregon Wildlife Federation honored him for his leadership as commission chairman.

Governor Vic Atiyeh appointed Metke to the Oregon Energy Policy Advisory Committee in 1981. Governor Atiyeh reappointed him to a second four-year term in 1985. He served on the committee until 1990.

Metke moved to Fort Myers, Florida in 2000 to be near his oldest son. He died in Fort Myers on September 8, 2013. He was 91 years old at the time of his death. A memorial service for Metke was held in Fort Myers at the Church of the Resurrection of our Lord on September 14, 2013.
