= Camp Sherman =

Camp Sherman may refer to:

- Camp Sherman, Nebraska, an earlier name for Fort Omaha, listed on the U.S. National Register of Historic Places
- Camp Sherman (Ohio), an Army National Guard training site established in 1917
- Camp Sherman, Oregon, an unincorporated community in Jefferson County
  - Camp Sherman Community Hall, listed on the U.S. National Register of Historic Places
