= Lancair IV =

American homebuilt aircraft

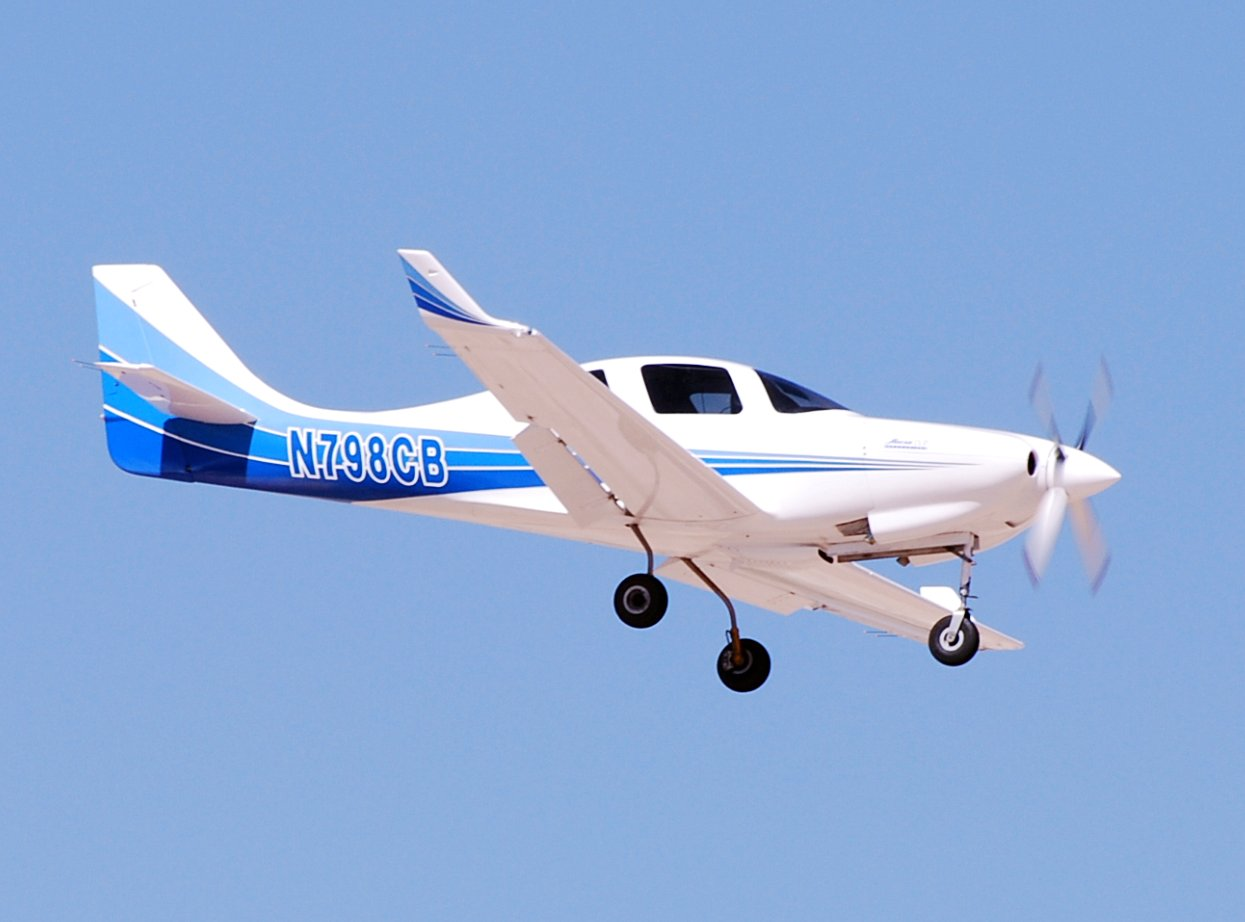
- Lancair IV-P

General information
- Type: Homebuilt aircraft
- Manufacturer: Lancair
- Status: Production completed 2012

History
- Manufactured: 360 (2011)
- Variants: Lancair Propjet; Lancair Tigress

The Lancair IV and IV-P are a family of four-seat, low-wing, retractable-gear, composite monoplanes powered by a 550-cubic-inch (9,000 cm^{3}) Continental TSIO-550 twin-turbocharged piston engine.

Production of the aircraft kit was ended in 2012.

== Development ==
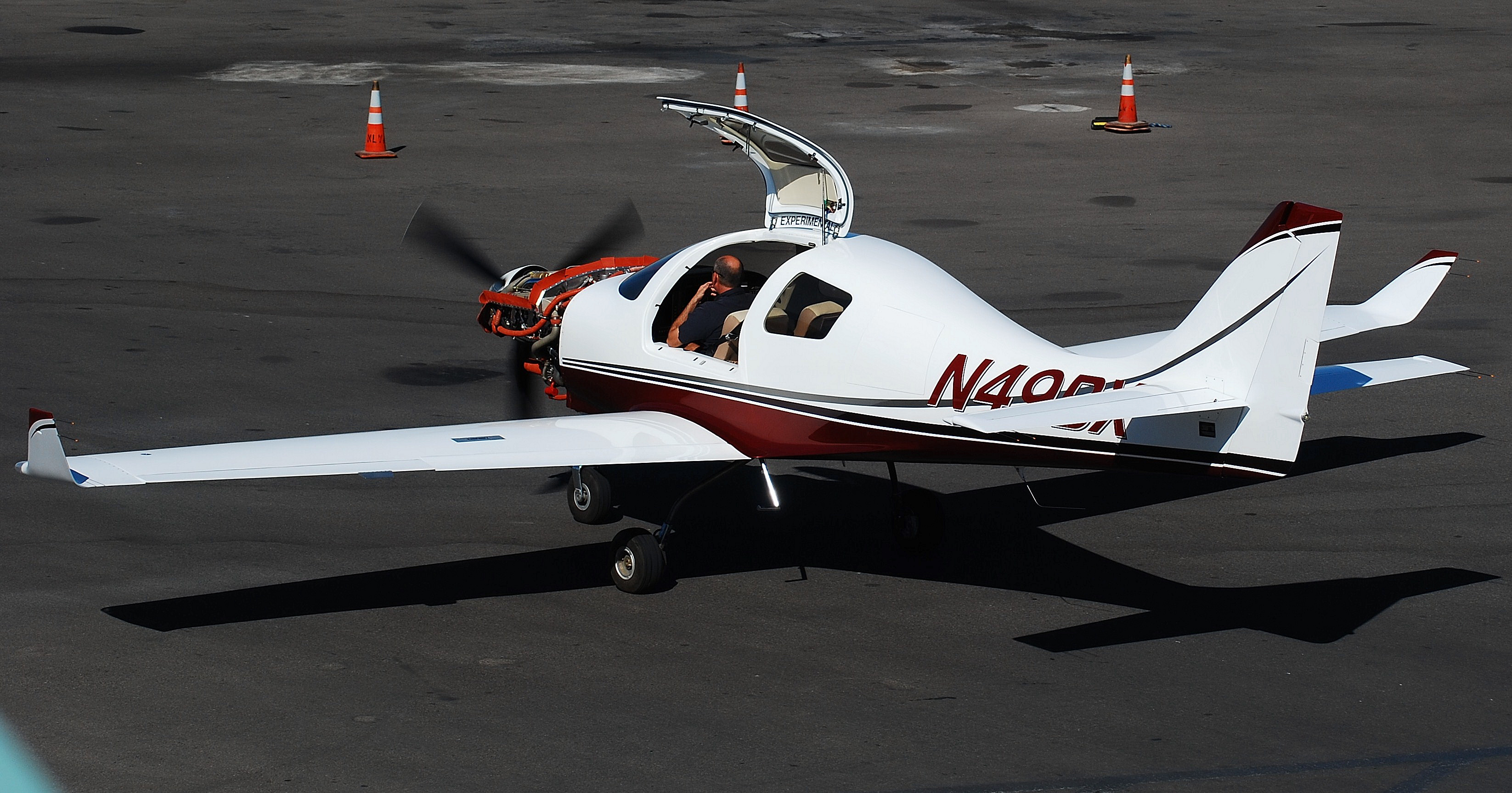
Lancair IV on a ground engine run with the engine cowlings removed and door open

The Lancair IV and IV-P were designed by Lancair around the Continental TSIO-550 — a twin turbocharged engine that is capable of developing 350 horsepower (260 kW) at sea level, and capable of operating at altitudes as high as 29,000 feet (8,800 m).

By the fall of 2011, 110 Lancair IVs and 250 IV-Ps had been completed and were flying.

In July 2016, the company announced it would sell the older Lancair lines of aircraft, including the Lancair IV, to concentrate on the Lancair Evolution instead. Once the transition was complete, the company changed its name to the Evolution Aircraft Company. The buyer of the old lines of aircraft continued in business as Lancair International, LLC.

== Operational history ==
In 2014, Bill Harrelson piloted a Lancair IV, and set a world speed record for solo flight between the earth's poles for an aircraft under 3,000 kilograms (6,600 lb) in a 175-hour-long series of flights. The flight also broke a record from Fairbanks, Alaska to Kinston, North Carolina. The aircraft was modified to hold 361 U.S. gallons (1,370 L; 301 imp gal) of fuel, so he had to fly solo; his engine was not turbocharged.

In March 2013 Harrelson set the current record for straight-line distance for aircraft under 3000 kg: 13060 km from Agana, Guam to Jacksonville FL. (Voyager holds the under-3000-kg record for closed-circuit distance.)

In December 2019 Harrelson set the record for flight westward around the world in a piston aircraft, flying Ontario, California to Ontario in 182 hr 18 min total time, 121 hr 50 min flying time. He flew alone, with the 361-gallon fuel tanks, and stopped at Honolulu, Djakarta, Cape Town and San Juan; great-circle distance for the five segments totals 40503 km, greater than Earth's equatorial circumference.

The Lancair IV has set many point-to-point speed records in its weight class; one of the most astonishing was a January 1999 flight by Gary Burns and Peter Lindsay, Brisbane to Sydney and back averaging 531 km/h for the round trip.

Philippine Aerospace Development Corporation produced 2 units.

== Variants ==
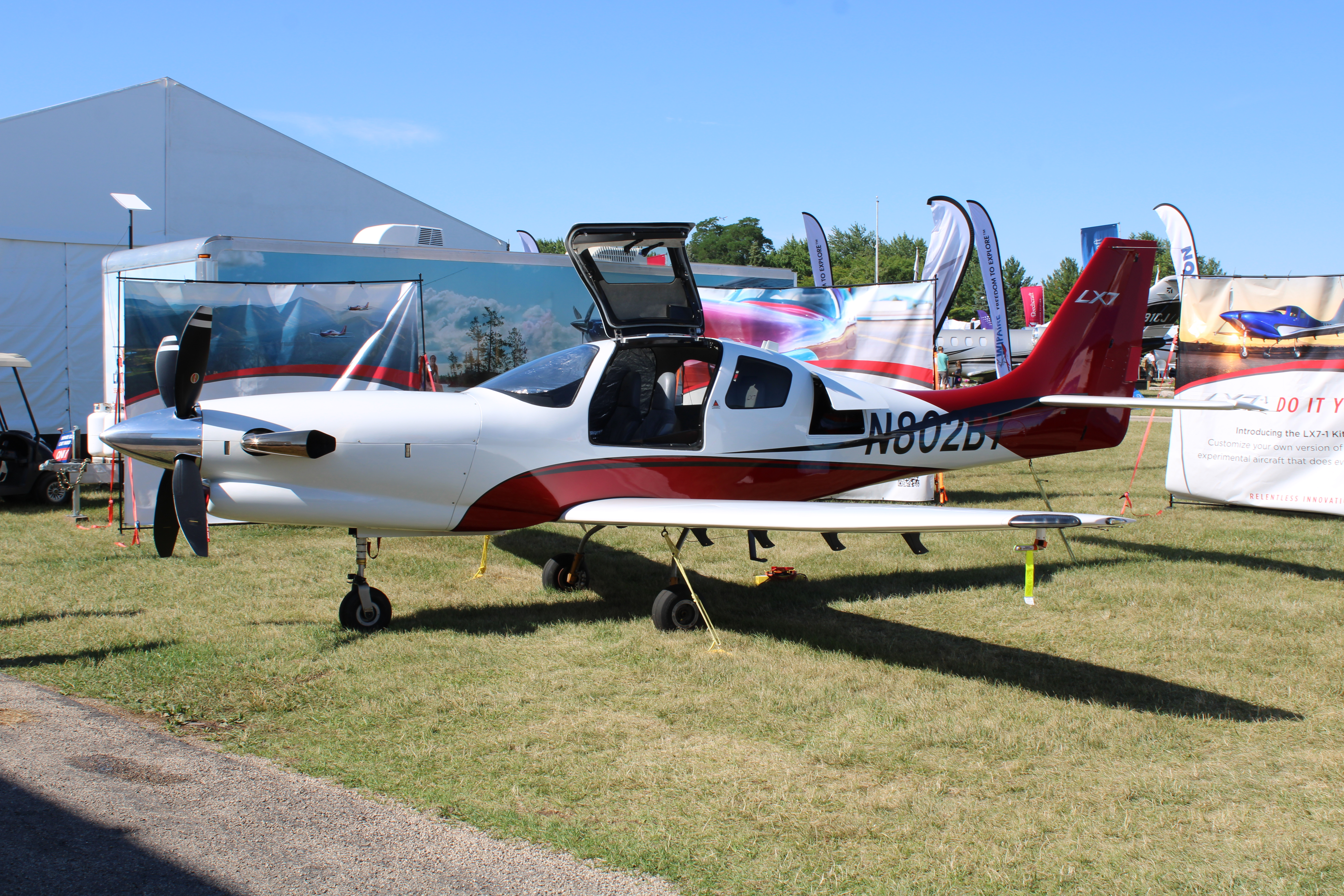
RDD LX7

Lancair IV
Unpressurized four seat kit-plane, powered by a 350 hp (261 kW) Continental TSIO-550 engine
Lancair IV-P
Pressurized four seat kit-plane, powered by a 350 hp (261 kW) Continental TSIO-550 engine
Lancair Propjet
Pressurized four seat kit-plane, powered by either a Walter or a PT6 Pratt & Whitney turboprop, that can achieve cruise speeds in excess of 300 knots (556 km/h) at altitudes up to 30,000 feet (9,140 m).
Lancair Tigress
A proposed pressurized version using the 600 hp (447 kW) Orenda OE600 V-8 engine, giving it a cruise speed of 405 mph (652 km/h). The engine was later cancelled, and consequently, only prototypes of the aircraft were completed.
RDD Enterprises LX7
A re-manufactured version that converted an existing IV-P by replacing the wing with one with a new airfoil to reduce stall speed, a new fuel system, new interior, and avionics.

== Accidents ==
On February 3, 2012, Steve Appleton, CEO of Micron Technology, was killed while attempting an emergency landing in a Lancair IV-PT turboprop at the Boise Airport in Boise, Idaho, moments after takeoff. He had aborted a take off a few minutes earlier. In the Investigation Report, the NTSB noted that "twenty-six percent of Lancair airplanes have been involved in accidents, and 19 percent have been involved in fatal accidents".

As of June 2014, the NTSB Aviation Accident Database recorded 20 crashes involving 18 fatalities across all IV variants.

On November 11, 2023 a Lancair IV-P overran the runway at Aero Country Airport (T31) in McKinney, Texas.

On July 30, 2025 Anh-Thu Nguyen died in her Lancair IV-P (N49BX) in a crash shortly after departing Indy South Greenwood Airport in Greenwood, Indiana. She was starting the second leg of a planned solo around-the-world flight.

== Specifications (Lancair IV-P) ==
Data from Lancair website and AOPA

General characteristics

- Crew: one
- Capacity: three passengers
- Length: 25 ft 0 in (7.62 m)
- Wingspan: 35 ft 6 in (10.82 m)
- Wing area: 98 sq ft (9.1 m^{2})
- Aspect ratio: 9:1
- Empty weight: 2,200 lb (998 kg)
- Gross weight: 3,550 lb (1,610 kg)
- Fuel capacity: 90 U.S. gallons (340 L; 75 imp gal), 110 U.S. gallons (420 L; 92 imp gal) with extended tanks
- Powerplant: 1 × Continental TSIO-550 six cylinder, horizontally opposed piston engine, 350 hp (260 kW)
- Propellers: 3-bladed Hartzell PHC-H3YF-1RF, constant speed, 12 ft 8 in (1.93 m) diameter

Performance

- Maximum speed: 342 mph (550 km/h, 297 kn)
- Cruise speed: 335 mph (539 km/h, 291 kn) @ 75% power, at 24,000 feet
- Stall speed: 71 mph (115 km/h, 62 kn) in landing configuration
- Range: 1,250 mi (2,010 km, 1,090 nmi) with 45 minute reserve at 24,000 feet
- Endurance: 4.3 hours with 45 minute reserve
- g limits: +4.4/-2.2 (utility category), +3.8/-2.0 (normal category)
- Rate of climb: 3,000 ft/min (15 m/s) at 3550 lbs gross weight
- Wing loading: 36.2 lb/sq ft (177 kg/m^{2}) without winglets
