= Lancair Tigress =

American homebuilt aircraft

Tigress

General information
- Type: Homebuilt aircraft
- National origin: United States
- Manufacturer: Lancair
- Designer: Lance Neibauer
- Status: Prototypes only flown
- Number built: 1

History
- Introduction date: late 1990s
- Developed from: Lancair IV

The Lancair Tigress was an American homebuilt aircraft that was designed by Lance Neibauer and intended for production by Lancair of Redmond, Oregon. Introduced in mid-late 1990s, it was essentially a Lancair IV with a much more powerful engine. When the engine was canceled just as it was entering production, the Tigress project ended with it. Only prototypes were produced.

The concept of a higher-powered Lancair IV derivative was finally filled by the Lancair Propjet.

== Design and development ==
The Tigress was intended to be a development of the Lancair IV adapted to employ the 600 hp (447 kW) Orenda OE600 V-8 engine, giving it a cruise speed of 405 mph (652 km/h). To accept the higher power and the increased speeds the airframe was structurally strengthened. The engine was later cancelled by its manufacturer, Orenda Aerospace, and the Tigress kit was not produced as a result.

The aircraft featured a cantilever low-wing, a four-seat pressurized cabin, retractable tricycle landing gear and a single engine in tractor configuration.

The Tigress was made from composites, including graphite fiber. Its 30.20 ft (9.2 m) span was 5.30 ft (1.6 m) shorter than that used on the Lancair IV, mounted flaps and had a wing area of 98.00 sq ft (9.104 m^{2}). The Tigress's wing used a McWilliams RXM5-217 airfoil at the wing root, transitioning to a NACA 64-212 at the wing tip, the same as employed on the Lancair IV.

The aircraft had a typical empty weight of 2,400 lb (1,100 kg) and a gross weight of 3,400 lb (1,500 kg), giving a useful load of 1,000 lb (450 kg). With full fuel of 115 U.S. gallons (440 L; 96 imp gal) the payload for pilot, passengers and baggage was 310 lb (140 kg).

== Operational history ==
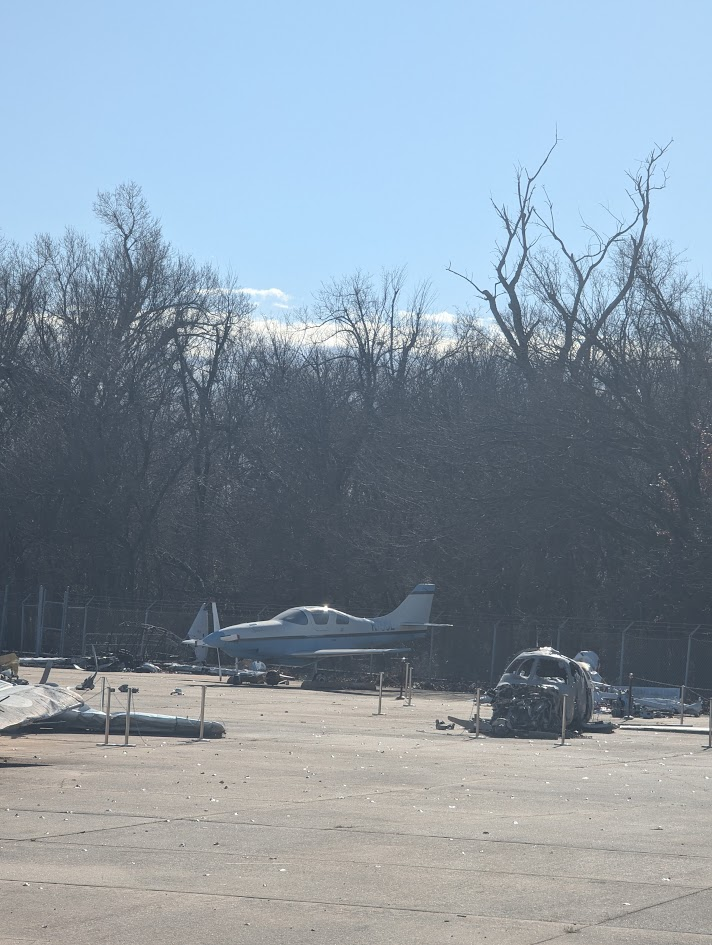
Lancair Tigress prototype in the Transportation Safety Institute aircraft boneyard, Oklahoma City

The sole prototype was deregistered on 27 June 2013 and sold, with the tail number (N750L) reserved through 2018. As of December 2025, it is located in the Transportation Safety Institute's (TSI) aircraft boneyard in Oklahoma City, Oklahoma.

== Specifications (Tigress) ==
Data from AeroCrafter and The Incomplete Guide to Airfoil Usage

General characteristics

- Crew: one
- Capacity: three passengers
- Length: 25 ft 0 in (7.62 m)
- Wingspan: 30.20 ft (9.20 m)
- Wing area: 98.00 sq ft (9.104 m^{2})
- Airfoil: root: McWilliams RXM5-217, tip: NACA 64-212
- Empty weight: 2,400 lb (1,089 kg)
- Gross weight: 3,400 lb (1,542 kg)
- Fuel capacity: 115 U.S. gallons (440 L; 96 imp gal)
- Powerplant: 1 × Orenda OE600 eight cylinder, four stroke aircraft engine, 600 hp (450 kW)
- Propellers: 4-bladed constant speed propeller

Performance

- Maximum speed: 405 mph (652 km/h, 352 kn)
- Range: 1,450 mi (2,330 km, 1,260 nmi)
- Wing loading: 34.7 lb/sq ft (169 kg/m^{2})
