= Lancair Evolution =

American homebuilt airplane

Evolution
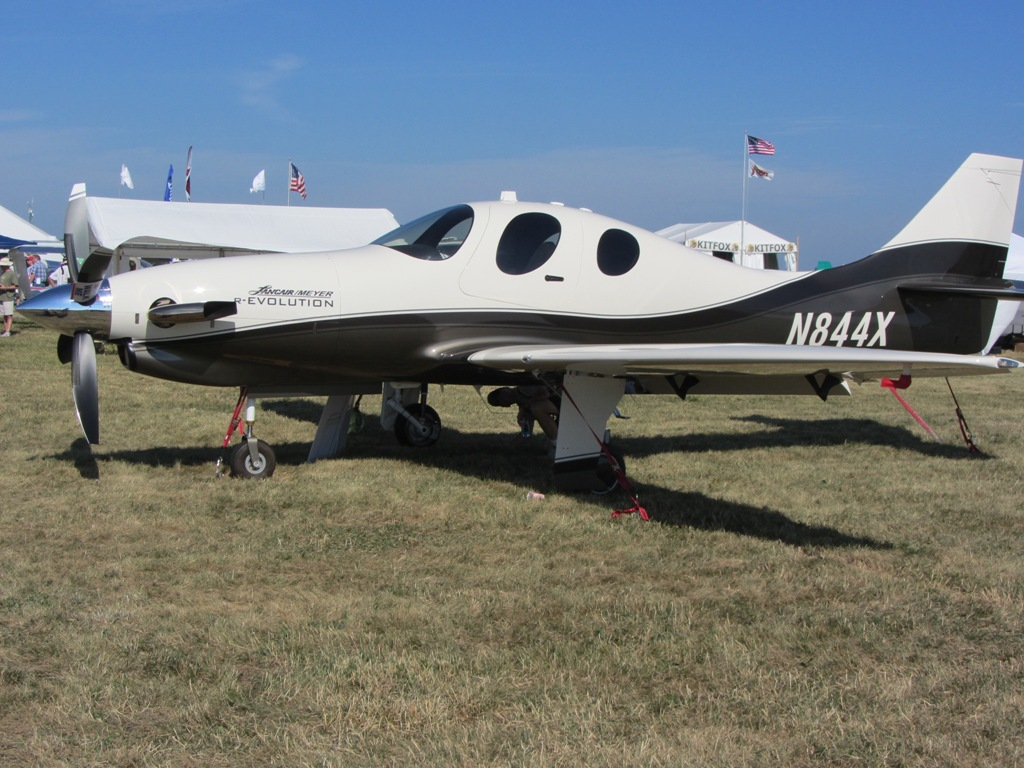

General information
- Type: Kit aircraft
- National origin: United States
- Manufacturer: Lancair; Evolution Aircraft
- Status: Production completed (October 2017)
- Number built: 1 piston Evolution (2011) +70 turbine Evolutions (Sep 2016)

History
- Introduction date: July 2009
- First flight: 21 March 2008

The Lancair Evolution is an American pressurized, low wing, four-place, single engine light aircraft, made from carbon fiber composite, developed by Lancair and supplied as an amateur-built kit by Evolution Aircraft.

The Evolution can be powered by a Lycoming TEO-540-A piston engine or a Pratt & Whitney PT6A-135A turboprop powerplant.

== Development ==
The Evolution was designed to meet the same FAR Part 23 aircraft certification standards that type certified aircraft comply with. The kit includes energy absorbing seats.

The aircraft is pressurized and was designed for a 6.5 psi (45 kPa) differential pressure, giving an 8,000 ft (2,438 m) cabin pressure at its maximum altitude of 28,000 ft (8,534 m).

The turbine version of the Evolution is powered by the 750 hp (559 kW) Pratt & Whitney PT6A-135A and has a maximum cruise of 300 kn (556 km/h) at 25,000 ft (7,620 m) on a fuel burn of 39 US gal (148 L) per hour of Jet-A. Cruising at an economy cruise of 270 kn (500 km/h) at 28,000 ft (8,534 m) it burns 23 US gal (87 L) per hour. It has a full-fuel payload of 837 lb (380 kg) and a 61 kn (113 km/h) flaps-down stall speed.

The piston version is powered by a Lycoming TEO-540-A2A engine and has a maximum cruising speed of 270 kn (500 km/h) on a fuel burn of 22 US gal (83 L) per hour of avgas. At an economy cruise speed of 240 kn (444 km/h) the fuel flow is 17.5 US gal (66 L) per hour. It has a full-fuel payload of 773 lb (351 kg) and a 61 kn (113 km/h) flaps-down stall speed. A second piston variant was introduced in April 2016, powered by a Lycoming iE2 engine of 350 hp (261 kW).

The first customer kit was delivered on 22 July 2008, and production was planned at that time for two kits per month. By December 2011, one piston model and 15 turbine models had been completed and flown. Construction time from the supplied kit is estimated as 1000 hours.

In April 2017, the manufacturer announced new turboprop engine options for the design. The Evolution Turbine can be fitted with three different variants of the Pratt & Whitney PT6 turboprop powerplant producing 550 hp (410 kW), 750 hp (559 kW) and 867 hp (647 kW), respectively. The latter version cruises at 330 kn (611 km/h).

The manufacturer issued a statement on 5 October 2017 indicating that they were going through a restructuring and had laid off 22 of its 49 employees on 3 October 2017. The Aircraft Owners and Pilots Association reported on 19 October 2017 that the company was apparently out of business, citing inability to obtain product liability insurance following a fatal accident. On 26 October 2017, Aero News Network reported that the company was "for sale. And while reports last week of the company being closed appeared to be premature, the kit maker is certainly struggling" and seeking a buyer. ANN reported also that the company has been unable to obtain insurance due to high-profile accidents. On 4 November 2017, the company indicated in an interview in The Bend Bulletin, that they were still in limited operations, "focused on fulfilling customer commitments" and were seeking investors. On 22 May 2018, Flying reported that the company had shut down, but that an unrelated company, Elite Pilot Services, was providing owners with technical support.

== Specifications (Evolution with PT6) ==
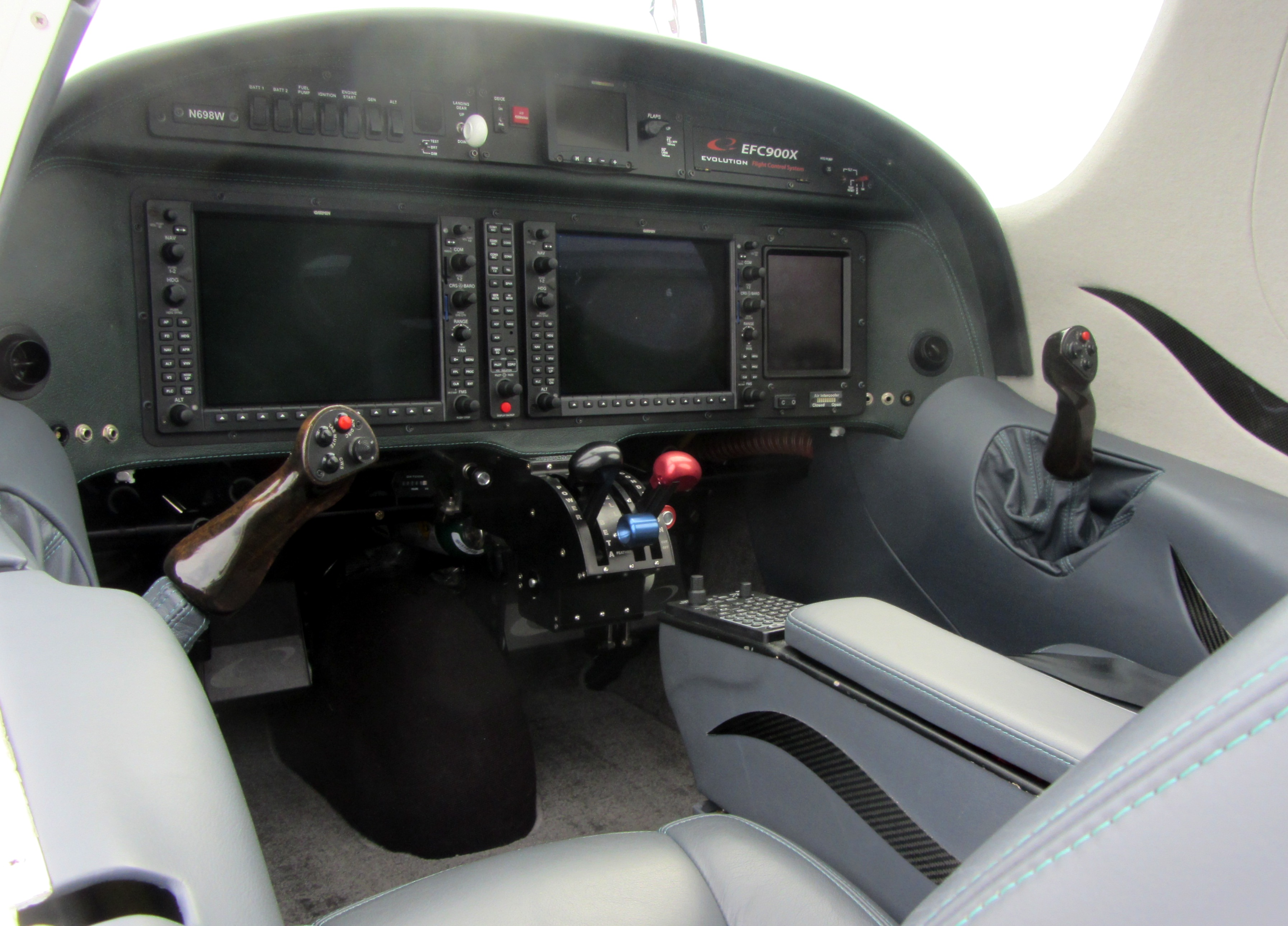
Evolution instrument panel

Data from Manufacturer

General characteristics

- Crew: one
- Capacity: three passengers
- Length: 30 ft (9.1 m)
- Wingspan: 37 ft (11 m)
- Height: 10 ft (3.0 m)
- Empty weight: 2,650 lb (1,202 kg)
- Gross weight: 4,550 lb (2,064 kg)
- Fuel capacity: 168 U.S. gallons (640 L; 140 imp gal)
- Powerplant: 1 × Pratt & Whitney PT6A-135A turboprop aircraft engine, 750 hp (560 kW)
- Propellers: 4-bladed Hartzell Propeller

Performance

- Maximum speed: 256 kn (295 mph, 474 km/h) maximum cruise speed (true airspeed)
- Stall speed: 61 kn (70 mph, 113 km/h) flaps down, indicated airspeed
- Never exceed speed: 300 kn (350 mph, 560 km/h) indicated airspeed
- Range: 1,027 nmi (1,182 mi, 1,902 km) no reserve
- Service ceiling: 28,000 ft (8,500 m) limited by RVSM
- Rate of climb: 4,000 ft/min (20 m/s)
- Time to altitude: 13 minutes to 25,000 ft

== See also ==
Related Aircraft

- Lancair Propjet
- Lancair IV-P
