= Ole W. Grubb =

American politician (1891–1981)

- Oregon state legislator Ole Grubb, 1944

Member of the Oregon House of Representatives from the 27th district
- In office 1957–1958
- Preceded by: Harvey H. DeArmond
- Succeeded by: J. Patrick Metke

Personal details
- Born: July 31, 1891 Douglas County, Minnesota, U.S.
- Died: January 29, 1981 (aged 89) Bend, Oregon, U.S.
- Party: Democratic
- Spouse: Agnes P. Johnson

Ole William Grubb (July 31, 1891 – January 29, 1981) was an American politician who served one two-year term in the Oregon House of Representatives as a Democrat. Before being elected to the legislature, Grubb was a commissioner for Deshutes County and justice of the peace for the city of Bend, Oregon.

== Early life ==
Grubb was born on a farm in Douglas County, Minnesota on July 31, 1891. He was the son of Per Person (later Peter P.) and Ranghild (née Lindstrom) Grubb. Both his parents were natives of Sweden.

Grubb attended school in Holmes City, Minnesota. As a young man, he took an automotive and gasoline engine engineering correspondence course. Later, he graduated from Northwestern Taxidermy School in Omaha, Nebraska.

In 1913, Grubb moved to the northwest corner of North Dakota, where he filed a homestead claim and became a farmer. To supplement his farm income, he worked as a carpenter, logger, and road construction contractor. He also worked in a local coal mine during the winter months. Grubb married Agnes Pearl Johnson on December 6, 1917 in Bowbells, North Dakota. In 1920, after three years of bad crops and cold winters in North Dakota, Grubb moved his family to Central Oregon.

== Central Oregon ==
After arriving in Oregon, Grubb went to work as a logger for the Shevlin-Hixon Lumber Company. He later took a job at the company's sawmill in Bend. From 1926 to 1932, Grubb was the superintendent of the street maintenance department in the city of Bend. In that position, he built the city's first street washing machine and its first paving machine. Grubb was also one of Bend's first volunteer firemen, serving as a city fireman from 1922 through 1934.

During World War II, Grubb was an employee of the United States Army at Camp Abbot, south of Bend. At Camp Abbot, he ran the ordnance and mechanical shops. He was elected Deschutes County commissioner, a position he held from 1941 to 1943. He also began serving on the Deschutes County Welfare Commission in 1941 and remained on the commission for the next 15 years, until 1956.

For two years in the late 1940s, Grubb worked at the Army ordnance shop in Bend. In 1950, he was elected Bend's justice of the peace. He continued in that position through 1954 when the post was abolished by the state legislature and replaced with a district judge.

Grubb lived on a 300-acre (120 ha) farm near the small unincorporated community of Tumalo, approximately 5 miles (8.0 km) north of Bend. At his farm, Grubb enjoyed repair work and other mechanical-type hobbies. Grubb was also active in civic affairs and community organizations. He was a member of the Central Oregon Pioneer Association and served as president of that organization. He helped found the local pioneer museum. Grubb was a member of the Tumalo school board for six years. He was also a member of two local grange organizations, the Pine Forest Grange and the Tumalo Grange.

== State representative ==
In 1956, Grubb decided to run as a Democrat for the District 27 seat in the Oregon House of Representatives. At that time, District 27 represented Deschutes County in central Oregon. He was unopposed in the Democratic primary. In the Republican primary, incumbent Harvey H. DeArmond was also unopposed. In the general election, Grubb defeated DeArmond by 44 votes, receiving 4,616 votes against DeArmond's 4,572 votes.

Grubb took his seat in the Oregon House of Representatives on January 14, 1955, representing District 27. He worked through the 1957 regular legislative session which ended on 21 May. During the session, he served on the highways, fish and game, and public health and welfare committees. As a legislator, Grubb was the champion of a successful bill that increased funding for community colleges across the state.

After the 1957 legislative session closed, the Speaker of the Oregon House of Representatives appointed Grubb to serve on an interim committee chartered to review the organization of state fish and wildlife agencies and related hunting and fishing laws and regulations. The committee was directed to make specific recommendations to be introduced as bills during the next legislative session. In late October and early November 1957, Grubb participated in a special legislative session that lasted 18 days. The governor called the special session to allocate a large state revenue surplus between taxes relief and additional funding for education programs.

In 1956, Grubb ran for re-election, seeking to retain his House seat in District 27. He was unopposed in the Democratic primary. Likewise, J. Patrick Metke was unopposed in the Republican primary. In the general election, Grubb lost to his Republican challenger by 292 votes. The final tally was 3,567 votes for Grubb against 3,859 for Metke.

== Later life ==
After he left the legislature, Grubb returned to Bend where he remained active in local politics, supporting the Democratic Party's platform and candidates. In 1962, Grubb decided to run for Deschutes County commissioner again. He won the Democratic primary against Vernon I. Peck while the incumbent George F. Baker was unopposed in the Republican primary. In the general election, Grubb lost to Baker by 1,060 votes, receiving 3,420 against 4,480 votes for Baker.

Over the years, Grubb and his wife raised nine children of their own. They were also foster parents for approximately 160 other children. Many of their foster children only stayed a few days during family emergencies, but two stayed with the Grubbs for over eight years.

Grubb died at St. Charles Medical Center in Bend on January 29, 1981. He was 89 years old at the time of his death. Grubb was buried at Greenwood Cemetery in Bend. In July 1981, the Oregon state legislature passed a memoriam bill honoring Grubb.
