= Kessler R. Cannon =

American state legislator and radio broadcaster

- State representative Kess Cannon, 1962

Member of the Oregon House of Representatives from the 27th; then 21st district
- In office 1961–1964
- Preceded by: J. Patrick Metke
- Succeeded by: Sam Johnson

Personal details
- Born: December 23, 1915 Portland, Oregon, US
- Died: October 9, 1986 (aged 70) Salem, Oregon, US
- Party: Republican
- Spouse: Blanche Moore
- Profession: Radio broadcaster

Kessler Richard Cannon (December 23, 1915 – October 9, 1986, known as Kess Cannon) was an American radio broadcaster and state legislator from Oregon. He was a Republican who served two two-year terms in the Oregon House of Representatives. Outside the legislature, Cannon was a broadcaster and executive for radio station KBND in Bend. He also served as Governor Tom McCall's assistant for natural resources before becoming director of the Oregon Department of Environmental Quality.

== Early life ==
Cannon was born in Portland, Oregon on December 23, 1915. He was the son of Arthur M. Cannon and Olive (Pfiffner) Cannon. His father was born in Illinois and moved to Oregon in 1909, where he was a public school superintendent and administrator for 35 years. Cannon grew up and attended public school in Hood River and Toledo He graduated from Toledo High School in 1933.

Cannon went on to attended college at the University of Oregon, where he received a bachelor's degree in 1937. During his senior year, Cannon won the university's Failing-Beeckman oratorical contest, one of the school's top honors at that time. After graduation, Cannon stayed on at the university as a graduate assistant.

After leaving the university, Cannon took a teaching position at Crook County High School in Prineville. While in Prineville, he taught classes in speech, social science, and music. He was also the school's debate coach and band director.

In 1938, Cannon married Blanche Moore. She was born in Jefferson County and grew up in Prineville. Together they had two sons.

In 1940, Cannon ran for a seat on the Prineville city council. He was one of 13 candidates seeking to fill six council positions. The field included the six incumbent councilmen. While the council got two new members, Cannon was not one of them.

In 1941, Cannon moved to Coos Bay, Oregon, where he taught at Marshfield High School. At Marshfield, he taught English, speech, and American history. Cannon was also the school's debate coach and band leader.

== Broadcasting and civic affairs ==
In 1943, Cannon left Coos Bay for a new job at radio station KBND in Bend. He began his radio career as the station's commercial manager and general announcer. In that position, he was a regular program presenter. His most popular program was an agriculture and crop report. As a result of that program, he was made an honorary member of the Central Oregon Milk Producers and the Deschutes County Cattlemen's Association.

In Bend, Cannon also got involved in a wide range of civic and social groups. He became active in the Bend Chamber of Commerce and joined the Masons and the local Eagles lodge as well as serving as president of local Parent-Teacher Association.

In 1944, Cannon joined the United States Army as an infantryman. His first assignment was in the Army personnel office at Camp Roberts in California. In the Army, Cannon continued to promote central Oregon. He had the Bend Chamber of Commerce send him tourist brochures to pass out to fellow soldiers at Camp Roberts. In early 1946, he was reassigned to Fort McClellan in Alabama. Cannon served in the Army for almost two years and achieved the rank of staff sergeant. Near the end of his service, he was transferred to Fort Lewis in Washington state where he was discharged in July 1946.

After leaving the Army, Cannon returned to Bend and went back to his broadcasting job at KBND radio. Upon his return, he was promoted to assistant station manager and program announcer. Cannon delivered a wide variety of broadcasts including news, sports, agriculture updates, and history programs. One of his most popular programs was called 15 Minute Histories, which was first aired on KBND in 1953. It was a series that featured Cannon's interviews with Oregon pioneers and homesteaders, who told their stories for the radio audience. Eventually, he became known as the "voice of KBND".

Cannon also reengaged with community groups and expanded his civic activities. He joined the local Elks lodge in early 1946. Later that year, Cannon worked with the music committee at Bend's First Presbyterian Church to organize a choir. He volunteered to serve as choir director. In the early 1950s, he began teaching speech classes at Central Oregon Community College. He also joined the Central Oregon Hospital Foundation board of directors, a position he held for nine years. He was elected president of the Bend Chamber of Commerce in 1957 and served in that position for two years. That same year, he served as chairman of the Deschutes County school reorganization committee. As a result of his outstanding service to the Bend community, Cannon was honored as the city's 1957 Citizen of the Year.

== State representative ==
In 1960, Cannon decided to run as a Republican for the District 27 seat in the Oregon House of Representatives. District 27 represented Deschutes County in central Oregon. He was unopposed in the Republican primary. In the Democratic primary, Orval J. Hanson of Bend was also unopposed. Cannon won the general election. The final vote tally was 5,482 for Cannon against 4,293 for Hanson.

Cannon took his seat in the Oregon House of Representatives on January 9, 1961, representing District 27. He worked through the 1961 regular legislative session which ended on May 10. During the session, he served on the agriculture committee as well as the elections and reapportionment committee. To keep his constituents informed, Cannon broadcast daily legislative updates on KBND radio.

Cannon was an active legislator. He sponsored the bill that establish a state-wide community college system. He also developed the reapportionment plan that redrew the state's legislative districts based on the 1960 United States census. The plan made only a few changes to existing districts in northwest Oregon and one change in north central Oregon. The House elections committee approved the plan, supported by coalition of Republicans and eastern Oregon Democrats. Most western Oregon Democrats opposed the plan. Cannon's reapportionment bill was ultimately passed. After the 1961 session ended, the Speaker of the Oregon House of Representatives appointed Cannon to the legislature's interim committee on natural resources. The interim committee was chartered to review natural resource issues and related laws and regulations. Based on that review, the committee was assigned to draft appropriate legislation for considered during the next legislative session.

Several months after the 1961 legislature session was adjourned, the Oregon Supreme Court determined that the legislature's reapportionment plan was unconstitutional and ordered Oregon Secretary of State Howell Appling to develop a new apportionment plan. The court directed that the new plan be based solely on population. Appling complied and delivered a new plan that reduced the number of eastern Oregon senators from six to five and made a number of changes to eastern Oregon House district, resulting in a net loss of three eastern Oregon seats. One of the House changes combined Cannon's Deschutes County district with the neighboring district that included Crook and Jefferson counties, creating the new tri-county District 21.

In early 1962, Cannon decides to run for the new District 21 seat, representing Crook, Deschutes, and Jefferson counties. He was unopposed in the Republican primary. Ben Evick of Madras, the incumbent who had previously represented Cook and Jefferson counties, was unopposed in Democratic primary. As a result, Cannon and Evick faced each other in the general election. In the November general election, Cannon won the District 21 House seat by 296 votes . Cannon received 6,583 votes against Evick's 6,287 votes. Evick won Crook and Jefferson counties, but Cannon carried Deschutes County by a wide (twenty percent) margin, giving him the victory.

Cannon took his District 21 seat in the Oregon House of Representatives on January 14, 1963. During the session, he served on the agriculture and livestock, natural resources, and military affairs committees. Once again, Cannon was an active legislator. He supported a bill proposed by Governor Mark Hatfield to create a state natural resource department. Cannon also continued his regular KBND radio broadcasts on legislative issues. The 1961 legislative session ended on June 3. After the session closed, Cannon was appointed to the interim committee on wildlife. The interim committee studied existing wildlife regulations and delivered its report just prior to the beginning of the 1965 legislative session.

In November, Oregon voters disapproved an income tax increase which force the state government to cut spending. The Oregon Attorney General, Robert Y. Thornton, forced a special legislative session by declaring that Governor Hatfield could not cut state education support without legislative approval. As a result, the governor called a special legislative session on November 11. Canon participation in the special session. During the session, the legislature passed several bills allowing the governor to reduce education support and cut funds from state agencies to balance the state's budget. The special session was adjourned on December 2.

== Later life ==
In the spring of 1964, Cannon announced he would not run for a third term in the Oregon House of Representatives. After he left the legislature, Cannon continued as a broadcaster on KBND radio in Bend. In 1965, he bought the radio station and become the station's general manager.

In 1967, Governor Tom McCall selected Cannon to be the executive secretary of the state's Natural Resources Committee, an important executive position on the governor's staff. The Natural Resources Committee was an interagency group created by the legislature at the request of the governor. The committee had members from a number of agencies including the state Forestry Department, Agriculture Department, Commerce Department, Geology and Mineral Industries Department, Public Instruction Department, Oregon Game Department, Fish Commission, Marine Board, Water Resources Board, Sanitary Authority, Parks Division, State Engineer, and Oregon State University School of Agriculture. After accepting the position in the governor's office, Cannon and his wife moved to Salem.

In his new position, Cannon played an important role in shaping state policies regarding Oregon's oceans, beaches, forests, water ways, fish stocks, wildlife, and outdoor recreation sites. He supported the protection of Oregon's coastal zone. In 1970, Governor McCall sent Cannon to testified before the United States Congress on behalf of the legislation to create the Oregon Dunes National Recreation Area. His advocacy and public outreach efforts helped lay the groundwork for the Oregon Beach Bill and Oregon Bottle Bill as well as important pollution control and land use planning legislation.

In 1974, Governor McCall appointed Cannon to be director of Oregon Department of Environmental Quality. Cannon was a very active director and champion of environmental issues. Under his leadership the state's environmental quality department push the legislature to subsidize community recycling programs. His agency enforced tough environmental standard on industries throughout the state and fined companies that polluted the air or water. During this time, Cannon worked on environmental issues with numerous groups including the Oregon Nuclear and Thermal Energy Council, Oregon Natural Resource and Environmental Agency Committee, and the International Conference on the Human Environment. He was also a special advisor to the National Aeronautics and Space Administration. Cannon resigns from the department in June 1975, six months after the new Democratic governor, Robert W. Straub, took office.

After leaving the department of environmental quality, Cannon accept the Tom Lawson McCall Professorship chair at Oregon State University. He stayed on the faculty for one year, teaching political science and natural resources management. After leaving the university in 1976, Cannon was hired as a consultant supporting the National Marine Fisheries Service. In that post, he served as the agency's conservation coordinator.

In 1978, Cannon joined the Association of Oregon Counties as the organization's lobbyist in Salem. He served as the association's full-time legislative advocate until 1984. After retiring, he continued to support the association as a part-time consultant and did related work for the Council of Forest Trust Land Counties. In 1984, Governor Vic Atiyeh appointed Cannon to Oregon's Water Resources Board.

== Death and legacy ==
Cannon died in Salem on September 9, 1986. He was 70 years old at the time of his death. A memorial service for Cannon was held in Salem at the Virgil Golden Chapel on September 13, 1986. His wife, Blanche, died in Salem on April 10, 2009.

Today, Cannon's personal papers and other documents are held at the Oregon Historical Society research library in Portland. The collection includes documents from his career in politics and government. Many of the records relate to environmental issues and natural resource policies from the time he worked in Governor Tom McCall's administration. In addition, audio recordings of Cannon's oral history interviews made for his "15 Minute Histories" radio program which was broadcast by KBND in the mid-1950s are now in the Deschutes County Library collection in Bend, Oregon.
