= KMTK =

- Bend, Oregon; United States
- Broadcast area: Bend, Oregon
- Frequency: 99.7 MHz
- Branding: 99.7 The Bull

Programming
- Format: Country
- Affiliations: Compass Media Networks

Ownership
- Owner: Combined Communications, Inc.
- Sister stations: KBND, KLRR, KTWS, KWXS

History
- First air date: June 2000
- Call sign meaning: Mountain (former branding)

Technical information
- Licensing authority: FCC
- Facility ID: 88428
- Class: C2
- ERP: 26,000 watts
- HAAT: 208 meters (682 ft)
- Transmitter coordinates: 44°04′39″N 121°19′57″W

Links
- Public license information: Public file; LMS
- Webcast: Listen live
- Website: 997thebull.com

KMTK (99.7 FM, "The Bull") is a commercial radio station licensed to serve Bend, Oregon, United States. The station is owned by Combined Communications, Inc.

KMTK broadcasts a country music format. Notable programming includes "The Morning Buzz" with JT Lancer & Donna James on weekday mornings, "Work Daze" with Dave Christi, and "The Afternoon Rush" with Sabrina Sloan. Syndicated music programming includes America's Grand Ole Opry Weekend from Westwood One.

== History ==
This station received its original construction permit from the Federal Communications Commission on April 20, 2000. The new station was assigned the call letters KMTK by the FCC on May 9, 2000. The station began broadcasting in June 2000. KMTK received its license to cover from the FCC on August 29, 2000.
