= Harvey H. DeArmond =

American attorney and judge

- Harvey DeArmond, attorney and legislator

Member of the Oregon House of Representatives from the 27th district
- In office 1955–1956
- Preceded by: Byron A. Stover
- Succeeded by: Ole W. Grubb

Personal details
- Born: December 30, 1884 Near Albany, Oregon, U.S.
- Died: June 2, 1970 (aged 85) Bend, Oregon, U.S.
- Party: Republican
- Spouse: Mabel Collins
- Profession: Attorney

Harvey Hamilton DeArmond (December 30, 1884 – June 2, 1970) was an American attorney, judge, and Oregon state legislator. When the state of Oregon created Deschutes County in 1916, DeArmond was appointed the county’s first district attorney. Later, he served as president of the Oregon State Bar Association. DeArmond was a Republican who served one two-year term representing Deschutes County in the Oregon House of Representatives.

== Early life ==
DeArmond’s family migrated to Oregon from Tennessee in 1880, settling near Albany, Oregon. DeArmond was born there on 30 December 1884, the son of Elias C. DeArmond and Nancy Caroline (Love) DeArmond. He attended school in Albany prior to the family moving to Grants Pass, Oregon, where Elias became a farmer and worked in the lumber business.

DeArmond attended public schools in a rural area near Grants Pass. He went on to attend college at Southern Oregon Normal School (now Southern Oregon University) in Ashland, Oregon. After graduating from college, he entered Oregon Law School which was located in Portland at that time. He graduated with a Bachelor of Laws degree in 1910.

== Attorney ==
After finishing law school, DeArmond passed his bar examination in May 1910 and moved to Medford, where he began practicing law in partnership with his brother. In 1911, DeArmond married Mabel Emily Collins from Gold Hill, Oregon. Together, they had two children, Robert William and Betty Jean.

In 1913, DeArmond moved to central Oregon. He settled in Bend and opened a law office there. When he arrived, DeArmond was one of only three lawyers in the community. He was successful in his private law practice, specializing in criminal and land cases. When Deschutes County was created in 1916, Governor James Withycombe appointed DeArmond as the county’s first district attorney. When his appointed term as district attorney expired in 1918, he ran for re-election and was elected to the post. However, he resigned in 1920 and returned to private law practice. Then from 1927 to 1934, DeArmond served as Deschutes County’s district judge. In 1934, DeArmond joined Jay H. Upton to form a private law firm in Bend.

DeArmond was a prominent member of the Central Oregon Bar Association, the Oregon State Bar Association, and the American Bar Association. As an attorney, he was well known for his knowledge of water rights and irrigation laws. In the early 1920s, DeArmond won an important case that allowed local settlers to take over the Central Oregon Irrigation Company. In 1939, he was elected to a one-year term as president of the Oregon State Bar Association.

In addition to his professional interests, DeArmond was active in civic affairs. In politics, he was a strong supporter of the Republican Party. For example, he was a delegate to Republican National Convention in 1932, 1936, and 1952. He was a founding member, and later president, of the local Kiwanis club. He was also a prominent member of the Elks, Moose, Eagles, and Knights of Pythias. Over the years, he served as president of all those organizations. He was also a member of the Woodmen of the World. In addition, he was a member of the Bend Commercial Club and the local chamber of commerce, serving as the chamber’s president for a time. Later, he was elected vice president of the Oregon Irrigation Congress. In addition, DeArmond liked to fish and play golf.

== State representative ==
In 1954, DeArmond decided to run as a Republican for the District 27 seat in the Oregon House of Representatives. At that time, District 27 represented Deschutes County in Central Oregon. He was unopposed in the Republican primary. In the Democratic primary, Webster L. Loy was unopposed. In the general election, DeArmond defeated Loy by 119 votes, receiving 3,171 votes against Loy’s 3,052 votes.

DeArmond took his seat in the Oregon House of Representatives on 10 January 1955, representing District 27. He worked through the 1955 regular legislative session which ended on 4 May. During the session, he served on the commerce and utilities, agriculture, and judiciary committees. Over the course of the legislative session, DeArmond earned praise from the Speaker of the Oregon House of Representatives, Edward A. Geary, as well as both liberal and conservative members of the House. In addition, the local print media commended DeArmond for his thoughtfulness and independence.

In 1956, DeArmond ran for re-election, seeking to retain his House seat in District 27. He was unopposed in the Republican primary. Likewise, Ole W. Grubb was unopposed in the Democratic primary. In the general election, DeArmond lost to his Democratic challenger by 44 votes. The final tally was 4,572 votes for DeArmond against 4,616 for Grubb.

== Later life and legacy ==
After he left the legislature, DeArmond returned to his law practice. In 1958, DeArmond received the first Law Day professional service citation awarded by the Central Oregon Bar Association at a ceremony in the Deschutes County Courthouse. In addition, he continued to actively support candidates running for office. For example, he endorsed Kenneth J. O'Connell for a seat on the Oregon Supreme Court during the 1958 election cycle. DeArmond remained active in the state bar association, serving as parliamentarian at state bar convention in 1959. A year later, he celebrated his fiftieth year as a member of the Oregon Bar.

In 1964, DeArmond was honored for his 50 years as a member of the Knights of Pythias. Later that year, his wife died in Bend at age 76. DeArmond was the keynote speaker at the 50th anniversary celebration of Deschutes County’s founding held at the county courthouse in Bend in 1966.

DeArmond died at his home in Bend on 2 June 1970. He was 85 years old at the time of his death. DeArmond was buried at Greenwood Cemetery in Bend. Today, a conference room in the Deschutes County courthouse in Bend is named in honor of DeArmond.
