= KLRR =

FM radio station licensed to Redmond, Oregon

Coordinates: 44.077°N 121.334°W

- Redmond, Oregon; United States
- Broadcast area: Bend, Oregon
- Frequency: 101.7 MHz
- Branding: 101.7

Programming
- Format: Adult album alternative

Ownership
- Owner: Combined Communications
- Sister stations: KBND, KMTK, KTWS, KWXS

History
- First air date: June 17, 1985 (at 107.5)
- Former call signs: KEJC (5/1983-8/1983, CP); KPUP (1983–1985, CP)
- Former frequencies: 107.5 MHz (1985–1999)
- Call sign meaning: Sounds like "Clear" (former branding)

Technical information
- Licensing authority: FCC
- Facility ID: 12510
- Class: C2
- ERP: 23,000 watts
- HAAT: 223 meters

Links
- Public license information: Public file; LMS
- Webcast: Listen Live
- Website: 1017.fm

KLRR (101.7 FM) is a radio station licensed to Redmond, Oregon, and serving Bend, Oregon. Owned by Combined Communications, it broadcasts an adult album alternative format.

== History ==
KLRR “Clear 107” had an adult contemporary format in the late 1980s. The format evolved into more of an adult album alternative sound in the 1990s. KLRR moved from 107.5 to 101.7 in 1999, as "Clear 101.7".
