= James F. Short =

American businessman and politician

- Jim Short, businessman and politician

Member of the Oregon House of Representatives from the 29th district
- In office 1949–1950
- Preceded by: Burt K. Snyder
- Succeeded by: Byron A. Stover

Personal details
- Born: 5 December 1902 Russellville, Missouri, U.S.
- Died: 12 April 1986 (aged 83) Sublimity, Oregon, U.S.
- Party: Republican
- Spouse: Ruth E. Bales
- Profession: Businessman and rancher

James Franklin Short (1902-1986) was an American businessman, rancher, and politician from the state of Oregon. He was a Republican who served one two-year term in the Oregon House of Representatives, where he represented a large rural district in central and southcentral Oregon. He also served two separate periods as Oregon's director of agriculture. He was originally appointed to the position by Governor Paul L. Patterson. He then continued his service under Elmo Smith followed by a brief time under Robert D. Holmes. Later, he was re-appointed to the position by Governor Mark Hatfield. In between his periods of service in the Oregon Department of Agriculture, Short was state chairman of Oregon's Republican Party.

== Early life ==
Short was born in Russellville, Missouri, on 5 December 1902, the son of Robert H. and Anna E. Short. In 1906, Short's family moved from Missouri to Oregon, settling near Fort Klamath in southern Oregon. The family moved to central Oregon in 1917, where they established a ranch near Tumalo.

Short attended Bend High School for several years before being accepted into a special program at Oregon State College. As part of that program, Short received his high school diploma from Oregon State College. He then went on to study agricultural economics at the college. While at college, Short joined Sigma Chi fraternity. He also worked on the editorial staff of the college's monthly magazine, OSU Countryman. While still a student at Oregon State College, Short married Ruth E. Bales, who was from Bend, Oregon. Their wedding ceremony was held in Vancouver, Washington on 28 December 1922.

== Businessman ==
After finishing college in 1923, Short returned to central Oregon and went to work for the Central Oregon Irrigation District. He served as the district's assistant superintendent for two years. In 1925, Short joined his father-in-law to incorporate G. W. Bales Warehouse Company, an agricultural wholesale and farm supply business located in Redmond, Oregon. Later, Short bought the business from his father-in-law and renamed it Deschutes Grain and Feed Company. He eventually expanded the business to include a grain processing mill near Klamath Falls, Oregon.

Short's business purchased wholesale quantities of wheat, barley, and other grain crops and shipped those products to markets around the country. The company also bought wholesale quantities of wool, potatoes, peas, and turkeys for resale in larger markets. In addition, he sold livestock feed and crop seed to local ranchers and farmers. His company also sold farm machinery and agricultural equipment. Eventually, his business employed over 100 people. Short operated his crop marketing and farm supply business until 1946, when he sold his company to the Pacific Supply Cooperative.

Short also owned a 326-acre ranch one mile west of Redmond. Known as the Mile-Away Ranch, Short bought the property in 1942. He raised registered Shorthorn cattle and prize-winning Corriedale sheep on the ranch. He also raised hay, potatoes, and seed crops at his property.

While he was building his business, Short was also active in civic affairs and numerous professional organizations. In Redmond, he served on the city council and the local school board. He was also president of Redmond's chamber of commerce. During World War II, he served on the Deschutes County draft board. After the war, he was a member of the Deschutes County Veterans Services Committee. Short was also active in the local Masonic lodge and served on the Deschutes County Fair Association board of directors. At the state level, Short served as president of the Oregon Shorthorn Breeders Association, the Oregon Corriedale Breeders Association, and the Oregon Seed League. He was a board member of the Oregon Cattlemen's Association, the Oregon Farm Bureau Federation, and the Oregon Feed and Seed Dealers Association. He also served on several national agricultural boards including the National Potato Council and the Pacific Wool Growers Association.

== State representative ==
In 1948, Short decided to run as a Republican for the District 29 seat in the Oregon House of Representatives. At that time, District 29 included both Deschutes and Lake counties, two large rural counties in central and southcentral Oregon. He was unopposed in the Republican primary. In the general election, Short faced Democrat William P. Vernon of Lakeview. The Bend Bulletin endorsed Short, highlighting his success as a rancher and businessman. The newspaper also cited his active engagement in civic affairs as another reason for their endorsement. Short won the general election with 4,751 votes against Vernon's 3,678 votes.

Short took his seat in the Oregon House of Representatives on 10 January 1949, representing District 29. He worked through the 1949 regular legislative session which ended on 16 April. During the session, he served on the agriculture and education committees. With the defeat of William Vernon, Lake County did not have any of its citizens serving in the legislature for the first time in over a decade while there were two representatives from Deschutes County with seats in the 1949 legislature. This was a concern for Lake County voters. However, once the legislative session got underway, the Lake County Examiner commended Short for consulting with members of the Lake County community regarding key issues before the legislature. After the close of the 1949 legislative session, Short announced he would not run for re-election in 1950. He also offered to introduce Lake County candidates to Deschutes County voters during the next election cycle. Short also expressed his support for a plan to reapportion state House and Senate seats to ensure rural counties had local representation in the legislature.

At the end of the 1949 session, Short was appointed to a special interim committee chartered to study the need for a community college system in Oregon. The committee was directed to report its finding to the 1951 legislature for follow-up action. Just prior to the end of his two-year term, Short and the other members of the interim committee sent their report to the new legislature. The interim committee recommended establishing a network of community colleges across the state. The committee also recommended that the colleges be controlled by local school boards.

== Statewide service ==
After leaving the legislature, Short returned to his ranch in Redmond. In 1952, Short expanded his land holdings in central Oregon by buying the old Bend-Redmond airfield, a 349-acre property located between the two cities. The airfield was abandoned in the 1930s. By the time he bought the property, it had reverted to pasture land. Short used the property as winter pasture for his livestock. Short also continued his public service. In 1953, Governor Paul L. Patterson appointed Short to the Upper Columbia River Basin Commission, responsible for overseeing development and conservation of the Columbia River watershed in northeast Oregon. A year later, Short was appointed to a two-year term on the Oregon State Motor Association's board of directors.

In 1954, Governor Patterson selected Short to lead the Oregon Department of Agriculture. Short and his wife moved to Salem after he accepted the director of agriculture position. They bought a 250-acre farm near Salem and put his Redmond ranch and livestock up for sale. It took about a year to sell the Mile-Away Ranch and his other agricultural interests in central Oregon. While in office, Short encouraged the state to take over some federal agriculture programs, either directly or through joint agreements. In addition, he requested that an emergency fund be created to cover the cost of dealing with serious outbreaks of agricultural pests and diseases. Short also recognized that the department's office facilities were inadequate and advocated for a new headquarters building in Salem. Short served as director of agriculture for two and a half years, first under Governor Patterson; and then after Patterson's unexpected death, under Governor Elmo Smith.

In 1956, Robert D. Holmes (a Democrat) was elected governor to complete the remaining two years of Governor Patterson's term. After Governor Holmes took office in January 1957, he selected Robert J. Steward to replace Short as Oregon's director of agriculture. At the time, Steward was serving in the state legislature. At the request of the governor, Short agreed to continue leading the agriculture department until the 1957 legislative session ended, when Steward would be available to take over the position.

After leaving the state agriculture department, Short remained in Salem where he continued to operate his farm while he started a real estate business. At the same time, he became chairman of Oregon's Republican State Central Committee. He succeeded Wendell Wyatt in that important (but unpaid) statewide political position. As state Republican chairman, Short focused his party on reducing taxes and controlling government expenditures. He was outspoken in his criticism of Governor Holmes’ tax and spending policies. As the 1958 elections got closer, Short pushed county Republican committees to focus on recruiting quality candidates for local and states offices. In the 1958 general election, Republican Mark Hatfield won the governor race by 50,000 votes. In the Oregon House of Representatives, Republicans picked up 4 seats, but the Democrats still controlled that body. In the state senate, Democrats won four new seats and took control of that chamber as well.

Shortly after the election, Short resigned as state Republican chairman and returned full-time to his farm and real estate business. In 1960, Governor Mark Hatfield appointed Short to a second term as state director of agriculture. During his tenure, Short reorganized the department to be more efficient and responsive while improving the working conditions for department employees. In 1961, he was elected secretary of Western States Agriculture Directors Association and two years later he became president of that organization. During that period, Short was also appointed to the board of governors for the Agricultural Hall of Fame in Kansas City, Missouri. While in office, Short was investigated for conflict of interest in a real estate transaction involving a sale of a ranch in eastern Oregon. However, he was cleared by Oregon Real Estate Board's ethics committee. The investigation found that the property was listed prior to Short taking his public position and that he disclosed the listing to the governor prior to his appointment. In 1966, a new agriculture building was dedicated in Salem. The new facility provided convenient access for the public and better working conditions for the department staff.

Later that year, Short announced he would resign at the end of the year when Governor Hatfield's term expired. When he left office over 200 people attended his farewell banquet in Salem. Later that year, he received the 1967 Distinguished Service Award from the Oregon State Employees Association.

== Later life ==
After retiring from state government in 1967, Short continued to operate a farm near Salem. Later that year, he was appointed to the Marion County planning commission. In 1972, Short was honored at the Mission Mill Museum panegyric event in Salem. He was recognized for his outstanding contribution to Oregon agriculture. In 1973, Short became chairman of the agriculture honoree nominating committee for the museum's 1974 panegyric event.

Short died at his home in Sublimity, Oregon on 12 April 1986. He was 83 years old at the time of his death. Short was buried at Belcrest Memorial Park in Salem. His wife died two years later, on 5 September 1988.
