= Byron A. Stover =

American businessman and politician (1890–1984)

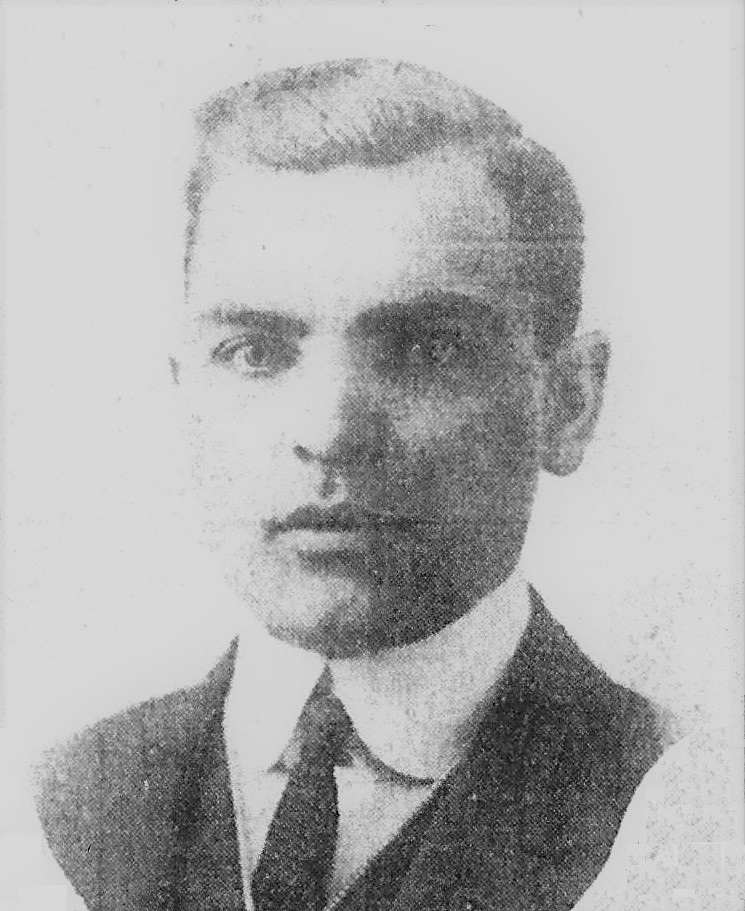
- Stover before moving to Oregon, 1914

Member of the Oregon House of Representatives from the 29th district
- In office 1951–1954
- Preceded by: James F. Short
- Succeeded by: Harvey H. DeArmond

Personal details
- Born: Byron Anderson Stover; November 8, 1890 Versailles, Ohio, U.S.
- Died: February 24, 1984 (aged 93) Bend, Oregon, U.S
- Party: Republican
- Spouse: Ruth Cushing Stover
- Profession: Theatre owner

Byron Anderson Stover (November 8, 1890 – February 24, 1984), also known as B. A. Stover or Dutch Stover, was an American businessman and politician from the state of Oregon. He was a Republican who served four years in the Oregon House of Representatives, where he represented a large rural district in central and southern Oregon. Today, Dutch Stover Park in Bend, Oregon is named in his honor.

== Early life ==
Stover was born in Versailles, Ohio, on November 8, 1890, the son of William H. Stover and Lucinda (Hole) Stover. He attended Parker Elementary School in Dayton, Ohio. Stover then attended high school in Dayton, graduating from Steele High School in 1908.

Stover went on to attend college at Ohio State University. While there, he played football and was a two-year letterman in that sport. He was also a member of Beta Theta Pi fraternity. Stover graduated from the university in 1913 with a degree in forestry.

== Businessman ==
Stover moved to Bend, Oregon in 1914. In Bend, Stover found a job with the Bend Company, which operated a sawmill on the west bank of the Deschutes River. However, he soon secured a position as a bank teller with the First National Bank. He stayed with the bank until the United States entered World War I.

When America entered World War I, Stover volunteered for military service. He was accepted into the United States Army officer training program and received his training at the Presidio in San Francisco, California. When he finished his training, Stover was commissioned as a second lieutenant. He served in France with the 17th Field Artillery Regiment. While in Europe, he participated in the Battle of Chateau Thierry, spending six weeks on the front lines. After his combat tour, he was sent to train troops in South Carolina for three months before being sent back to France.

After the war, Stover spent several years in Seattle, Washington. While living there, he began his career in marketing and exhibited motion pictures. In 1923, he moved back to Bend and purchased the Capitol Theatre there. A year later, he married Ruth Cushing and she joined him in Bend.

Over the years, Stover became one of Bend's most prominent businessmen. After purchasing the Capitol Theatre, he went on to buy the adjacent Liberty Theatre and several other movie theatres in and around Bend. He was well known in the Bend community for treating local children to a free movie every year on his birthday and on Christmas Day as well. He also gave free tickets to local high school athletes. He remained in the theatre business until 1946. After retiring from the theatre business, Stover became a partner in a men’s clothing store in downtown Bend. However, he continued to own and operate a theatre in Gilchrist (a small community south of Bend) until 1964.

In addition to his business interests, Stover was always active in civic affairs. In 1931, he was elected president of Bend’s Kiwanis club. Over the years, Stover served as president of the Bend Golf Club, the Bend Stampede, and the Bend Water Pageant. He was also chairman of two Red Cross fund raising campaigns. He was president of Bend Chamber of Commerce for two years and then became president of the Central Oregon Chamber of Commerce. He was a member of the city’s parks advisory board for many years. In addition, he was a member of American Legion and local Elks Lodge. Stover was also a devoted fan and volunteer coach of local sports teams. In 1944, he headed a community war bond drive. To encourage people to buy bonds, he gave free movie tickets to everyone who bought a bond. When the Bend Industrial Fund was created in 1945 to promote economic growth in the Bend area, Stover was elected to the Fund’s board of directors. In recognition of his extensive and significant contributions to the Bend community, Stover was selected as Bend’s Senior Citizen of the Year in 1951.

== State representative ==
In 1950, Stover decided to run as a Republican for the District 29 seat in the Oregon House of Representatives. At that time, District 29 included both Deschutes and Lake counties, two large rural counties in central and southcentral Oregon. He was unopposed in the Republican primary. In the general election, Stover faced Democrat William P. Vernon of Lakeview. Stover won by 465 votes, receiving 4,329 votes against Vernon’s 3,864 votes.

Stover took his seat in the Oregon House of Representatives on 8 January 1951, representing District 29. He worked through the 1951 regular legislative session which ended on 3 May. During the session, he served on the forestry, highways, and utilities committees.

At the end of the 1951 session, Stover was appointed to a special interim committee charged to conduct an in-depth study of highway fees and regulations. The committee was directed to report its finding to the 1953 legislature for follow-up action. Over the next year, the committee held public hearings on highway weight limits and use fees. The impact of logging trucks on state highways was a major focus area of the committee. The interim highways committee delivered its report in October 1952. Among its recommendations was a proposal to create a new state department of motor vehicles. The committee also drafted a bill to implement its recommendations.

In 1952, Stover ran for re-election. He was the only Republican to file for the District 29 seat. In addition, no Democrats entered the race so he was unopposed in both the Republican primary and the general election.

The 1953 legislative session began on 21 January. During the session, Stover was selected as chairman of the commerce and utilities committee. He was also assigned to the roads and highways, state and federal affairs, and forestry and mining committees. As chairman of the commerce and utilities committee, Stover oversaw contentious hearings regarding a bill that would allow utility companies to cover the cost of new power delivery projects with a temporary surcharge to customers. The session lasted three months, ending on 21 April.

== Later life and legacy ==
In early 1954, Stover announced he would not run for a third term in the state legislature. However, he remained active in state and local politics, using his influence to support Republican candidates. During the 1954 election cycle, he was chairman of the local campaign committee for Paul L. Patterson, the Republican Party’s candidate for governor. Stover also organized public hearings in the Bend area for a second interim highways committee that the legislature had chartered to continue studying the state’s highway regulation and fees.

In May 1954, the state senator who represented the district in which Bend was located resigned his seat in order to take a job at Lewis and Clark College near Portland, Oregon. Since the incumbent was a Republican, the county Republican committees of the five counties included in the district were responsible for selecting a new state senator. Stover was reported to be the leading candidate to fill the state senate vacancy. However, before the selection process got underway, Stover announced he was not interested in being appointed to the state senate.

Over the years, Stover actively pursued new business opportunities, supported political candidates, and continued to participate in civic affairs. In 1956, he became chairman of Bend Loggers baseball team. In 1958, he actively supported Mark Hatfield for governor. Two years later, he led the local effort to raise money for the Eisenhower Presidential Library in Abilene, Kansas. In 1968, Stover received the Beautiful Oregon Award from the Governor’s Committee for a Livable Oregon. The award recognized Stover’s efforts to preserve the scenic beauty of the Bend area.

Stover died at his home in Bend on 24 February 1984. He was 93 years old at the time of his death. Stover was buried at Pilot Butte Cemetery in Bend.

Today, Dutch Stover Park in Bend is named in his honor. The park was open to the public in 1971 with Governor Tom McCall joining Stover at the dedication ceremony. There are also several local awards and scholarships that bear his name. Since 1966, Central Oregon Community College has awarded the Dutch Stover Scholarship. The Dutch Stover Trust Fund provides college scholarships to local students and Bend High School annually presents the Stover Award to a top athlete.
