= KWXS =

Coordinates: 44.078°N 121.331°W

- Prineville, Oregon; United States
- Broadcast area: Bend, Oregon
- Frequency: 107.7 MHz
- Branding: Gold 107.7

Programming
- Format: Adult standards

Ownership
- Owner: Combined Communications
- Sister stations: KBND, KLRR, KMTK, KTWS

History
- First air date: April 4, 2012
- Call sign meaning: Wild XS (Latter call letters referring to 107.7) (former format)

Technical information
- Licensing authority: FCC
- Facility ID: 189513
- Class: C2
- ERP: 2,500 watts
- HAAT: 570 meters

Links
- Public license information: Public file; LMS
- Webcast: Listen Live
- Website: gold1077.com

KWXS (107.7 FM) is a commercial adult standards station in Prineville, Oregon, serving the Bend, Oregon area. The station is owned by Combined Communications,

It has been granted a Federal Communications Commission (FCC) construction permit to increase ERP to 2,500 watts.

== History ==
KWXS signed on the air with rhythmic contemporary as "Wild 107.7" on April 4, 2012.

On January 5, 2015 KWXS shifted their format to Top 40 (CHR), branded as "107.7 The Beat".

On May 1, 2023 KWXS changed their format from top 40/CHR to adult standards, branded as "Gold 107.7".
