= Luther Metke at 94 =

1979 film

- Directed by: Jorge Preloran; Steve Raymen
- Produced by: Richard Hawkins; Jorge Preloran
- Cinematography: Steve Raymen; Jorge Preloran
- Edited by: Jorge Preloran
- Music by: Twilo Scofield
- Production company: UCLA Ethnographic Film Program
- Distributed by: Northwest Cultural Films
- Release date: 1979
- Running time: 27 minutes
- Country: United States
- Language: English

Luther Metke at 94 is a 1979 American short documentary film directed by Jorge Preloran and Steve Raymen at the Ethnographic Film Program, University of California, Los Angeles. It was nominated for an Academy Award for Best Documentary Short in 1980.

The film presents a portrait of Luther Metke, a veteran of the Spanish–American War. Even in his advanced age, Metke continues his work of building log cabins by hand in the Cascade Mountains of Oregon. The film documents many aspects of log cabin building as Metke works on a hexagonal cabin and teaches his methods to a young couple. Additional footage shows Metke's daily life, accompanied by a voice over of his recollections, commentary on log cabin construction, and musings on life. Metke also shares some of his poetry on camera and through voice over.
