= KTWS =

Radio station in Bend, Oregon

- Bend, Oregon; United States
- Broadcast area: Bend, Oregon
- Frequency: 98.3 MHz
- Branding: The Twins

Programming
- Format: Mainstream rock
- Affiliations: United Stations Radio Networks

Ownership
- Owner: Combined Communications
- Sister stations: KBND, KLRR, KMTK, KWXS

History
- First air date: January 28, 1991
- Call sign meaning: Twins

Technical information
- Licensing authority: FCC
- Facility ID: 13579
- Class: C2
- ERP: 23,000 watts
- HAAT: 223 meters (732 ft)
- Transmitter coordinates: 44°04′39″N 121°19′57″W

Links
- Public license information: Public file; LMS
- Webcast: Listen live
- Website: thetwins.com

KTWS (98.3 FM, "The Twins") is a commercial radio station broadcasting a Mainstream Rock format (Classic Rock to Active Rock) in Bend and Central Oregon in the U.S. state of Oregon. They are the legacy Rock station in Central Oregon for 34 years. They received the OAB (Oregon Association of Broadcasters) Radio Station of the Year award in 2003, 2009, and again in 2022.

They initially had two transmitters simulcasting their signal at startup in 1991. The first being located in Bend Oregon on Awbrey Butte (98.3 FM), and the second in Warm Springs Indian reservation on Eagle Butte (96.5 FM). This is how the station moniker "The Twins" originated.

It has filed an application for a U.S. Federal Communications Commission construction permit to move to 98.5 MHz and increase ERP to 50,000 watts.
