= Evolution Aircraft =

American aircraft manufacturer

Evolution Aircraft Company
- Company type: Privately held company
- Industry: Aerospace
- Founded: 2017
- Headquarters: Redmond, Oregon, United States
- Key people: President: Kevin Eldredge (until Oct 2017); Bob Wolstenholme (from Oct 2017)
- Products: Light aircraft
- Website: www.evolutionaircraft.com

The Evolution Aircraft Company is an American aircraft manufacturer based in Redmond, Oregon. The company specializes in the design and manufacture of light aircraft in the form of kits for amateur construction.

Bob Wolstenholme is the president and CEO of Evolution Aircraft.

== History ==
In July 2016, Lancair announced it would sell off the older Lancair lines of aircraft to concentrate on the Lancair Evolution instead. Kevin Eldredge, who was Lancair's Director of Business Development, indicated that at one time Lancair's products had been unique in the market, but only the Evolution design now occupied that customer niche and thus it made sense to concentrate on that aircraft type. He stated, "there is nothing in the market that can compete with the Evolution" and "unless something drastically changes with the market, after the first of the year, we will be ramping up to one every two weeks." The company had been making 10% of its revenue from supporting the older, out of production designs with parts.

Due to the complexity of the Evolution aircraft design, it is not a traditional kit aircraft, that is normally built in a garage. Instead, the kit was designed to be built in professional facilities that assist the amateur builder, including the factory facility and commercial aircraft shops. This focus on using available space at the factory for builder assistance, plus lower sales of the older models, meant there was a good business case for selling off the older designs and freeing space for Evolution completions.

In February 2017, the assets, including the intellectual property for the older designs, were sold to Mark and Conrad Huffstutler, who moved the production of those models to Uvalde, Texas, and now operate the company as Lancair International, LLC. With the sale of the older aircraft lines, Lancair changed its name to Evolution Aircraft and remained in its existing Redmond facility.

The company issued a statement on 5 October 2017 indicating that they were going through a restructuring and had laid off 22 of its 49 employees on 3 October 2017. Company president and CEO Kevin Eldredge resigned and Bob Wolstenholme assumed that role. The Aircraft Owners and Pilots Association reported on 19 October 2017 that the company was apparently out of business, citing inability to obtain product liability insurance following a fatal accident. On 20 October 2017 Aero News Network (ANN) reported that the company was not answering customer or media inquires and that "its future is cloudy". That same day, local radio station KBND reported that the company was still in business, seeking a buyer and that AOPA's report that it had closed was incorrect. On 26 October 2017, ANN reported that the company was "for sale. And while reports last week of the company being closed appeared to be premature, the kit maker is certainly struggling" and seeking a buyer. ANN reported also that the company had been unable to obtain insurance due to high-profile accidents. On 4 November 2017, the company indicated in an interview in The Bend Bulletin, that they were still in limited operations, "focused on fulfilling customer commitments" and were seeking investors.

== Products ==
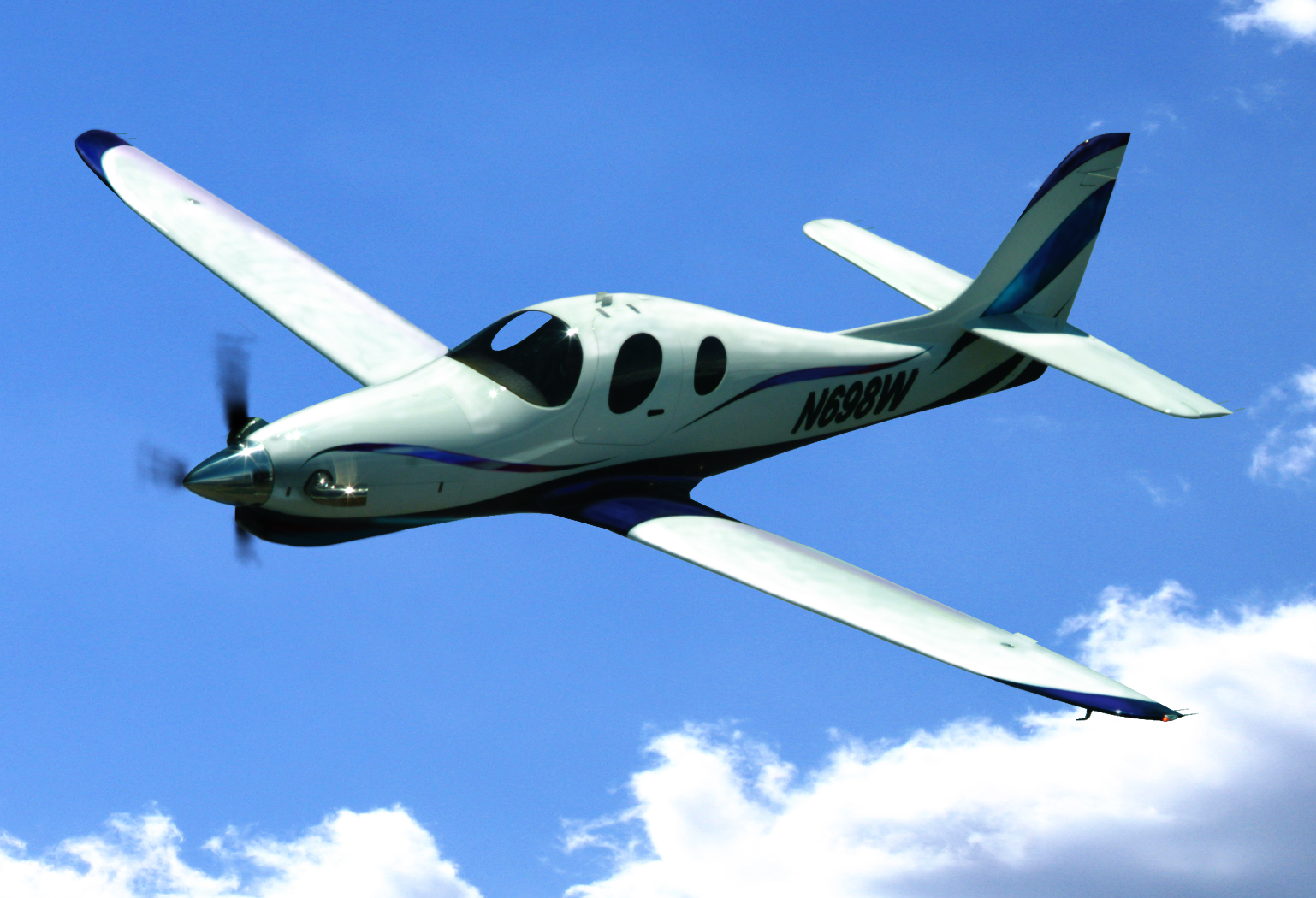
Lancair Evolution

- Lancair Evolution
