= Luther Metke =

American pioneer and poet (1885–1985)

- Born: February 20, 1885; Buffalo, New York, U.S.
- Died: April 7, 1985 (aged 100)
- Occupations: Pioneer, poet
- Spouse: Anna Dobbs
- Children: 4

Luther Metke (February 20, 1885 – April 7, 1985) was an American folk poet and early central Oregon pioneer who served in the Spanish–American War. He was the subject of Jorge Preloran's documentary Luther Metke at 94. Metke moved to Central Oregon in 1907 and built nearly every bridge between Bend and Crescent and over 30 log cabins.

== Early life ==
Metke was born in Buffalo, New York, and was brought up on a homestead in Minnesota. He started building log cabins as a young boy, helping other homesteaders, and immigrant families build homes. He enrolled in the US Navy in 1898, at the age of 15, saw battle in the Spanish–American War, and served in the Philippines, Japan, and China. During an expedition up the Yangtze river, Metke saw the impact that deforestation and uncontrolled logging could have on the environment; this experience would strongly influence his poetry. He was married to Anna Dobbs, of Ireland and they had two sons and two daughters.

== Midlife ==
Metke returned from service on the battleship Oregon and moved to central Oregon in 1907, at the age of 24. He purchased a homestead in Central Oregon, on the current site of the Sunriver Resort. He was a lumberjack, used the two-man saw to fall giant pines, some measuring six feet across, and floated them down the river for sale to mills in Bend, Oregon. Metke also built log cabins and bridges, a craft he remembered from his youth in Minnesota: he wrote that "a man never forgets how to use the old broad axe", the log-cabin building tool of choice for Metke. It is estimated that he built over 30 log homes in Central Oregon (including the grand lodge at Sunriver Resort) and built almost every bridge across the Deschutes River. In the 1920s, Metke became a labor organizer, an advocate of labor unions and better working conditions for workers in the logging industry. Metke's years spent homesteading, as a lumberjack and woodsman, shaped another of his personal facets and would strongly influence his poetry.

In 1949, Metke was a key builder of the Camp Sherman Community Hall located in Camp Sherman, Oregon, and in February 2003 it was listed as a National Register of Historic Places due to its rustic architecture highlighting late 19th and early 20th-century American movements: Bungalow/Craftsman and Western Stick architecture. Metke later built three more log cabins in the Camp Sherman area.

== Later life and poetry ==
In 1967, Metke settled in Camp Sherman, Oregon, on the Metolius River. By then he was known in Central Oregon as a rugged individualist, an environmentalist and a master builder of fine log cabins. No one suspected however, that Metke was also a poet, and for a good reason: he seldom shared his poetry, never attempted to publish it and shied away from his public image. In fact, he had little regard for poets—"Poems I write have a meaning; they're not about babbling brooks and such"—or for newspaper and television reporters, claiming "they want to make a hero out of somebody that has no business being one". Though it is unknown when Metke started writing poetry, he claimed he started in the 1970s as a means to communicate with his grandchildren. His poems touched on issues such as man's relationship with God, nature and aging. His poems are not regarded as exceptional by literary standards, but express with crushing clarity a way of life that was his and that has vanished: living in harmony with God and nature. Only 12 of his poems have ever been published—these were presented in a documentary—his other poems were destroyed late in his life.

"It isn't what we have, it isn't what we know. The only thing that matters, is the "good will" seeds we sow."

— Luther Metke, from February 5, 1985. "Luther Metke at 100, noted area man anticipates birthday". The Bulletin Newspaper

== Luther Metke at 94 documentary ==
Luther Metke at 94 was produced by Jorge Preloran and was an Oscar-nominated short documentary. It won six film festival awards including first place at the Atlanta Film Festival and the Silver Certificate at the Birmingham International Educational Film Festival. It was funded by the National Endowment for the Arts. Luther Metke at 94 documents Metke building his last log cabin, in Camp Sherman (on Metke Lane) at the age of 94 and includes several of his poems.
