= KBND =

Radio station in Bend, Oregon

- Bend, Oregon; United States
- Broadcast area: Bend, Oregon
- Frequency: 1110 kHz
- Branding: FM News 100.1 and 1110 KBND

Programming
- Format: News Talk Information
- Affiliations: Fox News Radio; Compass Media Networks; Premiere Networks; Salem Radio Network; Westwood One

Ownership
- Owner: Combined Communications
- Sister stations: KLRR, KMTK, KTWS, KWXS

History
- First air date: December 19, 1938 (at 1310)
- Former frequencies: 1310 kHz (1938–1941); 1340 kHz (1941–1950); 1270 kHz (1950–1951)
- Call sign meaning: K BeND

Technical information
- Licensing authority: FCC
- Facility ID: 9943
- Class: B
- Power: 10,000 watts day 5,000 watts night
- Transmitter coordinates: 44°6′25″N 121°14′39″W
- Translator: 100.1 K261DO (Bend)

Links
- Public license information: Public file; LMS
- Webcast: Listen Live
- Website: kbnd.com

KBND (1110 AM) is a radio station broadcasting a News Talk Information format. Licensed to Bend, Oregon, United States, the station serves the Bend area. The station is currently owned by Combined Communications and features programing from Fox News Radio, Compass Media Networks, Premiere Networks, Salem Radio Network, and Westwood One.

== History ==
Central Oregon residents were without favorable daytime medium wave broadcast reception before KBND, Bend's first commercial radio station, began serving the region December 19, 1938. Licensed to the Bend Bulletin, call letters KBND were selected in lieu of KCOB after concern was raised suggesting KCOB could connote corn cob rather than Central Oregon Broadcasters.

=== Facilities ===
KBND's initial license authorized operation either day or night on 1310 kHz with a power of 250 watts during daylight hours or 100 watts after sunset. Studio and offices were located in downtown Bend at the Pilot Butte Inn and were enlarged in 1945 at which time a United Press wire service printer was installed.

A 175-foot (53 m) Lehigh tower, constructed next to the Pacific Power and Light company power dam forebay by Contracting and Sales Company of Portland, Oregon, was employed. Radial ground system wires were placed both in the Deschutes River and ground adjoining with a 364-foot (111 m) feed line connecting the hotel building contained RCA transmitter to the antenna system.

In early 1941 signal audibility in areas outlying Bend improved with the installation of a limiting amplifier Frequency changed to 1340 kHz March 29, 1941 as obligated by FCC moving day requirements.

KBND made two further frequency changes. Effective May 29, 1950, coverage substantially increased when power was upgraded to 1000 watts day, 1000 watts directional night, and frequency shifted to 1270 kHz. As a result of interference caused to a Chilliwack, British Columbia broadcaster, KBND moved to clear channel frequency 1110 kHz on November 2, 1951. Coinciding with 1950 power increase, transmitter location shifted to an acreage outside the Bend city limits containing a newly constructed building and 2 towers required for directional operation. One tower was later repositioned in order to protect KFAB Omaha when 1110 kHz operation began. Studios, connected by phone line to the transmitter, remained in the Pilot Butte Inn basement until December 30, 1950 when facilities at the Coble Building two blocks away were occupied.

On July 19, 1957 power was upgraded to 5000 watts day, 1000 watts night with the implementation of a newly installed Collins 21E transmitter. Studios and offices moved from the Coble Building to newly constructed quarters at the 5000 Studio Rd. transmitter site on December 20, 1957.

KBND, a key state Emergency Broadcast System component, installed a 30KW generator in 1963 permitting operation during power outages. Subsequently, an auxiliary studio serving as both production room and fallout shelter control room was added.

In 1971, daytime power was increased to 10,000 watts.

Former logo

A new transmitter location, outside the Bend urban growth boundary, was sought in 1977. After FCC authorization was granted in 1982 and local land use approval was obtained in 1983, three 230 foot (70 m) towers were erected at the present transmitter site off Hamehook Rd., enabling a power increase to 25,000 watts day, 5,000 watts night in 1985. Several years later, daytime power was reduced to the present 10,000 watts. Offices and studios, remodeled in 1985, remained at the Studio Rd./711 NE Butler Rd. location until September 2008 when modern facilities at 63088 NE 18th St. were occupied.

=== Ownership ===
Several financial interests have been associated with KBND since 1938. The Bend Bulletin newspaper operated the station from its inception until 1945, when ownership transferred to Central Oregon Broadcasting. Frank Loggan became principal owner of the newly formed company after he exchanged his Bend Bulletin stock for a 150-share interest. Robert W. Sawyer and Henry Fowler, Bend Bulletin editor and associate editor respectively, individually controlled minority interests amounting to 100 collective shares. In 1965, Doug Kahle and Edward Tornberg, owners of broadcast outlets and CATV systems elsewhere, acquired KBND. In 1987, DENCO, Inc., a Seattle-based company, purchased the station for $964,000 before yielding ownership. Present owner Combined Communications acquired the station in 1990.

=== Staff ===
Original staff members included Stanton Bennett, Augie Hiebert, and Frank Hemingway. Bennett helped install the station's first equipment and was chief engineer until leaving for Alaska in 1939. Hiebert, a Bend resident in 1932 when he obtained an amateur radio license as a youth, returned from Wenatchee, Washington to work as engineer and announcer before leaving in August 1939 to help Bennett build KFAR. Wheeler, former announcer and newscaster at KOOS, Marshfield (Coos Bay, Oregon), was employed as commercial manager. Later he was general manager of KWIL, Albany, Oregon. Frank Hemingway, brother of Bend physicians Dr. Robert Hemingway and Dr. Max Hemingway, brought radio experience from CBL Toronto to KBND. Hemingway, a theatrical actor and director, was master of ceremonies for the station's dedicatory broadcast and began delivering newscasts. After he left the station in 1939, he joined KOIN and KGW before becoming well known as a Mutual Broadcasting System newscaster and commentator.

In May 1943, Kessler R. Cannon replaced commercial manager John G. Jones. Cannon, a teacher from Marshfield where he had been in charge of school voice and music programs, had worked as an announcer for KOOS. Following World War II service, he returned to KBND, filling numerous positions. Additionally, he served two terms as representative in the Oregon State Legislature. In 1967, he left the station after being appointed an aide to Governor Tom McCall.

KBND was owned for many years by Frank H. Loggan, who was President of the Oregon Association of Broadcasters (OAB) from 1947 to 1949. Initially Bend Bulletin advertising and radio station manager, Loggan became principal owner of Central Oregon Broadcasting in 1945 when he sold his Bulletin shares and obtained controlling interest in KBND. After he sold the station in 1965, he was OAB manager for four years before starting the tourism promotion organization presently known as the Central Oregon Visitors Association.

Due to its Class B operating frequency and its 5,000-watt output power, KBND can be heard across much of the northwestern states at night.
