= Orenda OE600 =

OE600
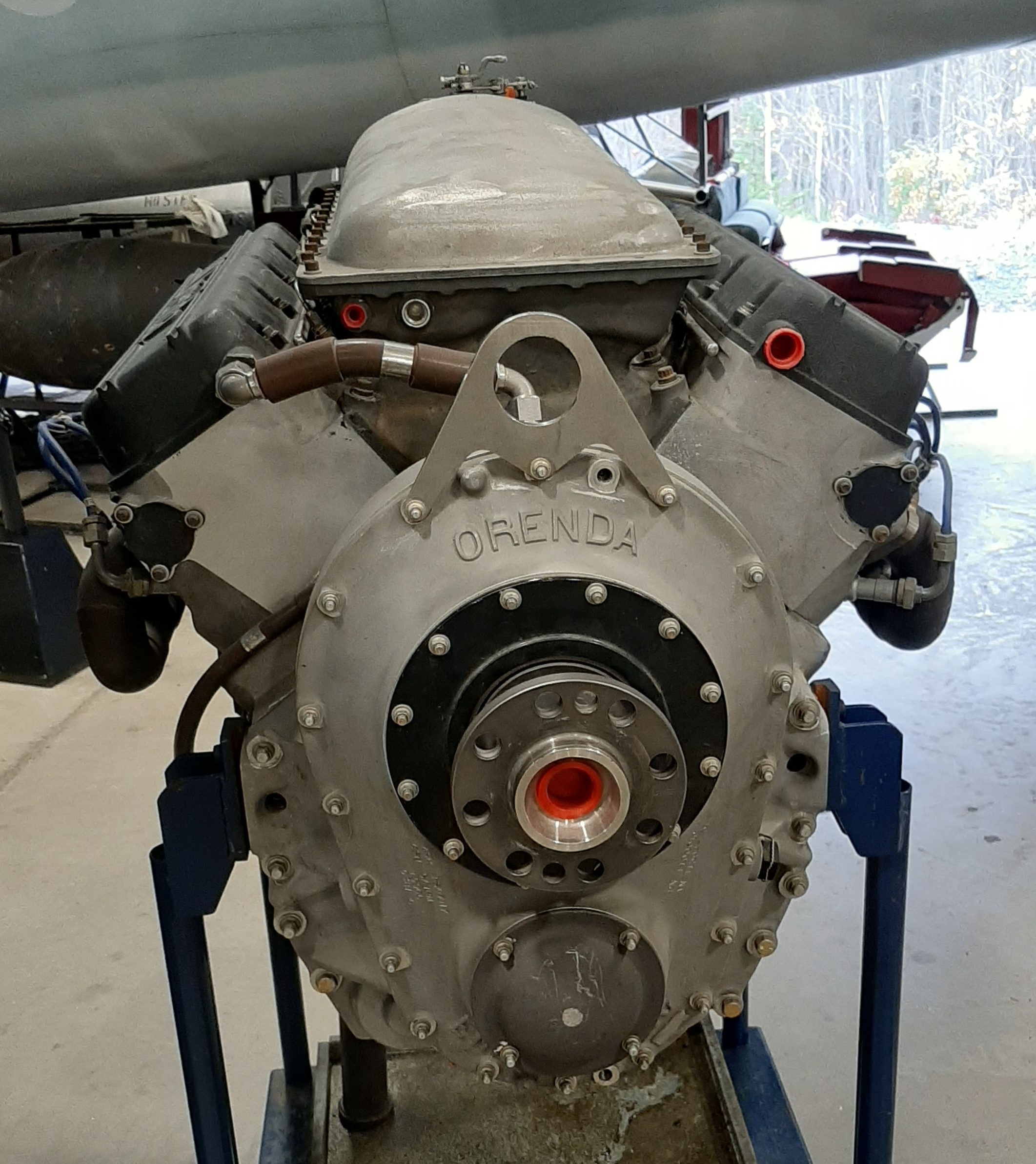
- A front view of the tidy gear reduction housing on the Orenda OE600 engine
- Type: V-block aircraft engine
- National origin: Canada
- Manufacturer: Orenda Aerospace
- First run: 1990s

The Orenda OE600 was a 600 hp-class liquid-cooled 8-cylinder V-block aircraft engine intended to re-introduce piston power to aircraft normally powered by the famous Pratt & Whitney Canada PT6 turboprop. The piston engine offers much better fuel economy, which Orenda Aerospace felt would be attractive for older aircraft whose engines were reaching the end of their lifespan. However, changes in Orenda's business in the post-9/11 market led to the project being canceled.

== Design and development ==
The engine traces its history to the "Generation 2" Chevrolet Big-Block engines of the 1960s. In 1969, General Motors adapted the engine to use a new aluminum block and heads, rather than cast iron, creating the ZL1. Originally, only 50 examples were produced in 1969 so they could be homologated for the Can-Am race series. Additional copies were produced to equip high-end versions of the Corvette, bringing the total production to 71.

In the late 1970s, Richard MacCoon, an aviation entrepreneur, and his brother, Grant MacCoon, owner of a Southern California automotive aftermarket products company, contacted Lee Muir, a racing engine builder formerly of McLaren, about adapting the ZL1 for aviation use. Eventually, a brand new engine, based on the linerless Reynolds 390 alloy Chevrolet used in the Can-Am series, was designed and a small number of prototype engines were built. In addition to the engine components, a propeller reduction gear drive and accessory drive gear section were designed by Richard Lyndhurst, of Santa Ana, CA. The engine package included twin turbochargers and a liquid-to-air aftercooler.

=== Testing ===
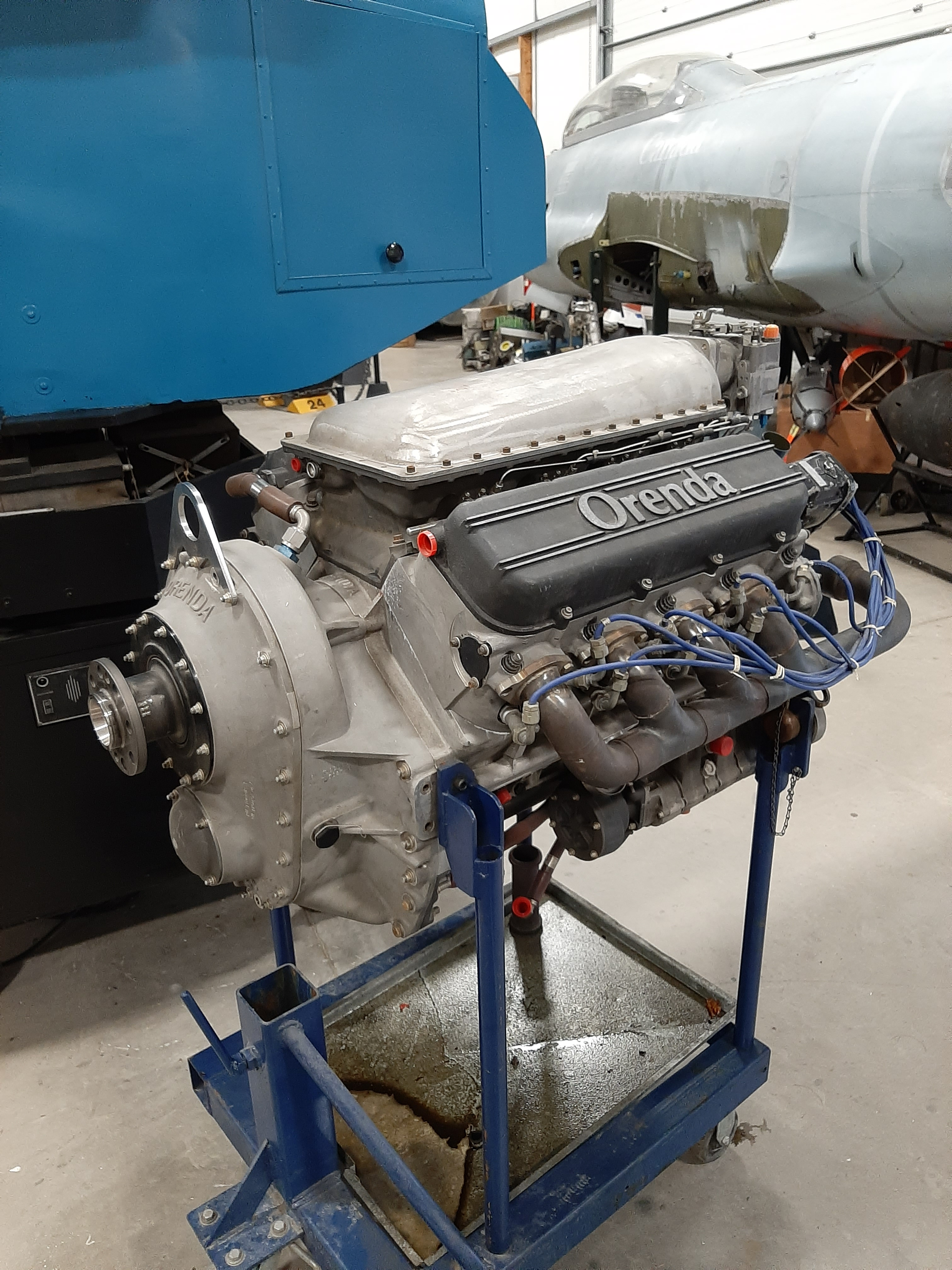
This Orenda OE600 V8 engine is in the Atlantic Canada Aviation Museum near Halifax, NS. Canada.

Early testing and development took place at the Shadow racing team facility in Marina, CA, near Monterey. The result, known as the Thunder Engine, was shown around the general aviation market during the 1980s. In about 1986, BKM, an automotive R&D consulting company in San Diego, CA, was contracted to continue development. Static ground tests and design refinement continued there for several years. Financial difficulties led to the project being abandoned after a reported investment of some $5 to $10 million. The engine proved to be difficult to adapt to the long-running high-reliability aviation needs.

Orenda took over development of the engine in 1994. According to their engineers, the engine as it was simply wasn't capable of running at cruise power for extended periods and required a huge amount of additional development. They completed the certification process in March 1998 as the OE600A. The OE600's target was the PT6, the most popular turboprop engine of all time. Although a turboprop has a superb power-to-weight ratio, it has high fuel consumption, and its performance drops off linearly with altitude. The OE600 offered better fuel economy, as well as considerably improved climb rates (even though it was heavier) and cruise speeds, all suggesting a lower overall cost of operation. On the downside, any piston engine is much more complex than a turbine, so the OE600 initially had a time between overhauls of only 1500 hours, compared to 2000-6000 for the PT6, with hot section inspections required at between 1000 and 2250 hours. Orenda expected to increase this to 2500 hours by collecting in-service reliability information.

=== Potential applications ===
Orenda and several third parties started the process of developing modification certifications for various popular aircraft. It was tested as a potential replacement engine on a number of aircraft, including the Air Tractor 300 and 400 Series, de Havilland Canada DHC-2 Beaver and DHC-3 Otter, the Beechcraft C90 King Air, Aero Commander 500 series, and AEA Explorer 500R. Any widely used aircraft with an engine of around 600 hp was considered as a potential target, which Orenda calculated at about 30,000 flying examples with the PT6, Pratt & Whitney R-1340 Wasp, Wright R-1820 Cyclone, and various Eastern Bloc engines of similar power. Several new aircraft were designed around the engine as well, including the TAI ZIU, Hongdu N-5, LZ-400 Rhino and the Lancair Tigress.

Orenda opened a new service depot known as Orenda Recip at the former CFS Debert in Debert, Nova Scotia. Here they intended to install and service the OE600. At the time they offered a supplemental type certificate conversion for the Otter, planning to follow this with the King Air. They were also interested in smaller and larger versions of the engine, floating a trial balloon at a 750 hp size (the OE750) before deciding on a naturally aspirated 500 hp version instead.

=== Cancellation ===
The events of September 11, 2001 required Orenda to re-focus entirely on their military projects, and the OE600 project was cancelled. The design was later purchased by a group of investors who intended to sell the engine under the Texas Recip brand. On 29 August 2006, the president of Texas Recip, Paul Thorpe, was sentenced to 3 years and five months for defrauding investors, telling them the money was being invested in the engine project or other investments, when it was being used to pay off investors in a previous scheme.

=== TRACE Engines ===
More recently the project has been picked up by TRACE Engines of Midland, Texas, and is certified by the Federal Aviation Administration. Yorkton Aircraft is handling Canadian installations in agricultural aircraft. A Canadian DHC-2 has received a temporary certificate with the engine in 2012 during a complicated registration process.

== Specifications ==
- Displacement: 495 cubic inches (8.1 litres)
- Bore: 4.433”
- Stroke: 4.000”
- Dimensions: 59.5”(l) x 32” (w) x 32.5 “ (h)
- Compression ratio: 8.1:1
- Weight: 740 pounds dry (335.6 kg)
- Performance: 600 hp @ 4,400 rpm takeoff (447 kW), 500 hp continuous (373 kW)
- Fuel Consumption: 0.44 lbs./hp/hr (100LL)
- TBO was established at 1800 hours not at 1500 hours.
- Power-to-weight ratio: 0.81 hp/lb (1.33 kW/kg)
