= Jorge Preloran =

Argentine filmmaker (1933–2009)

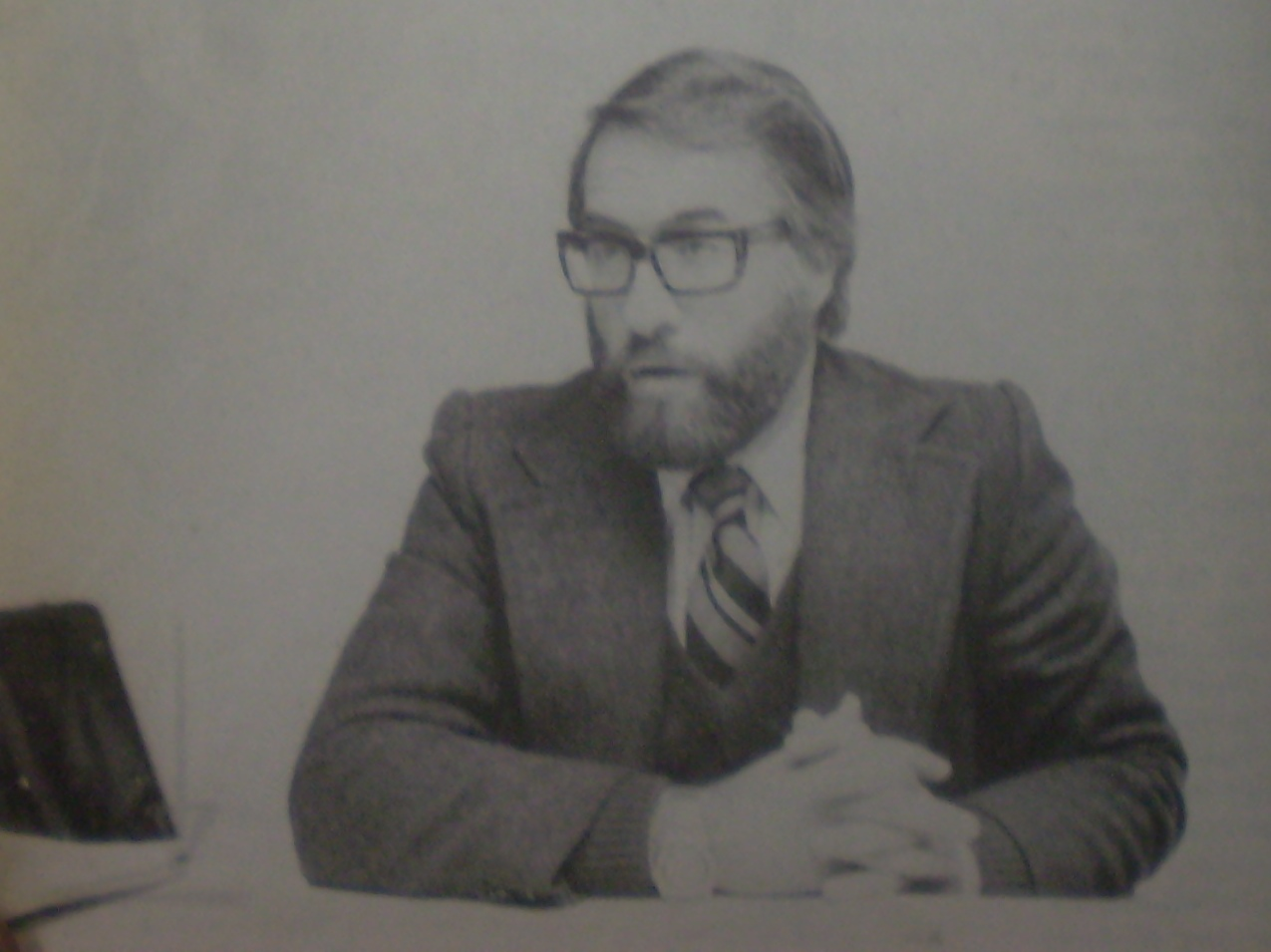
- Born: May 28, 1933; Buenos Aires
- Died: March 28, 2009 (aged 75); Culver City

Jorge Ricardo Preloran (May 28, 1933 – March 28, 2009) was an Argentine filmmaker and a pioneer in ethnobiographic film making.

== Life and career ==
Preloran was born in Buenos Aires to an Argentine father and an Irish American mother. He made a short film, Venganza, in 1954, and left Argentina to enroll at UCLA, graduating with a film studies major in 1961. Holding dual citizenship, he served with the U.S. military in West Germany. He began a career as a filmmaker in 1961, when the Tinker Foundation offered him a grant to make several films on the gauchos of Argentina. Preloran sought to redefine the genre of ethnographic films, moving away from depicting their subjects as exotic or primitive, striving to make films that, as he told Americas magazine, "do not use the people about whom they are made."

From 1963-1969 Preloran produced educational films and films on Argentine folklife at the Universidad Nacional de Tucumán in Tucuman, Argentina. He also began to work in a style of ethnographic film known as ethnobiography, in which "the filmmaker gets closer to the subject to give a portrait of the subject as well as their culture and practices."

His 1969 film Hermógenes Cayo (Imaginero) was recently listed as one of the ten best Argentine films of all times. In making this film, he spent months with the subject (artist Hermógenes Cayo) prior to shooting, and followed many of the subject's suggestions in the actual film-making. This relationship between filmmaker and subject was to be repeated through his career. Preloran made over 50 films in his lifetime, working in Argentina, the United States, Ecuador, and elsewhere.

His 1980 film Luther Metke at 94 was nominated for the 1981 Academy Award for Best Documentary Short.

Preloran taught at the School of Theater, Film and Television at UCLA from 1976 to 1994. In 2007 he donated his life's work to the Human Studies Film Archives, Smithsonian Institution, where his films are being preserved and made available for research. Preloran died in Culver City in 2009, at age 75.

== Filmography ==
- Venganza (1954)
- At Three O'Clock (1956)
- The Unvictorious One (1957)
- Mackinac Island (1958)
- This Is U.C.L.A. (1959)
- Death, Be Not Proud (1961)
- The Llanero (El Llanero) (1962)
- The Gaucho of Corrientes (El Gaucho Corriento) (1963)
- The Gaucho of the Pampas (El Gaucho de las Pampas) (1963)
- The Gaucho of Salta (El Gaucho de Salta) (1963)
- The Argentine Gaucho, Today (El Gaucho Argentino, Hoy) (1963)
- Costa Patagónica (1963)
- Costumbres Neuquinas (1963)
- La Patagonia Argentina (1963)
- Anfibios, Reproduccion y Desarrollo (1964)
- Potential Dinamico de la Republica Argentina (1964)
- La Biologia Experimental (1965)
- Dinosaurs — The Age of Reptiles (1965)
- El Estudio de los Vegetales (1965)
- Reptiles Fosiles Triasicos de la Argentina (1965)
- Máximo Rojas, Monturero Criollo (1965)
- Trapiches Caseros (1965)
- Feria en Simoca (1965)
- Casabindo (1966)
- Ocurrido en Hualfín (1966) (Co-directed by Raymundo Gleyzer)
- Quilino (1966)
- Viernes Santo en Yavi (1966)
- Purmamarca (1966)
- Claudia y Yo (1966)
- El Tinkunaco (1967)
- Salta y Su Fiesta Grande (1967)
- Un Tejedor de Tilcara (1967)
- Artesanias Santiagueñas (1968)
- Chucalezna (1968)
- Iruya (1968)
- Medardo Pantoja, Pintor (1968/1983)
- La Feria de Yavi (1969)
- Fiestas en Volcan Higueras (1969)
- Señalada en Juella (1969)
- Hermógenes Cayo, Imaginero (1970)
- Damacio Caitruz (Araucanians of Ruca Choroy ) (1971)
- El Grano Dorado (1971/1981)
- Manos Pintadas (Painted Hands) (1971/1981)—A documentary film about the Cueva de las Manos.
- The Red-Tailed Comet (1971) (Edited by Preloran; Photography by Francisco Contino)
- Remate en Estancia (1971)
- Claudia (1972)
- Valle Fertil (1972)
- The Ona: Life and Death in Tierra del Fuego (1973) (Photography and Editing by Preloran; Directed by Ann Chapman and Ana Montes de González)
- Cochengo Miranda (1974/1979)
- Los Hijos de Zerda (Zerda's Children) (1974/1978)
- The Warao People (Los Guarao) (1974)
- La Iglesia de Yavi (1977)
- La Maquina (The Pump) (1978)
- Luther Metke at 94 (1979) (Co-directed by Steve Raymen)
- Castelao (1980)
- Héctor di Mauro, Titeritero (Héctor di Mauro, Puppeteer) (1980)
- Mi Tia Nora (My Aunt Nora) (1983) (Screenplay by Mabel Preloran)
- Zulay Frente al Siglo XXI (Zulay Facing the 21st Century) (1989)
- Patagonia, en Busca de su Remoto Pasado (seven-part series) (1993)
- Obsesivo (Obsessive) (1994)

== Further viewing ==
- Rivera, Fermín. (Director). (2009). Traces and Memory of Jorge Prelorán [Video file]. Documentary Educational Resources. Retrieved June 23, 2021, from Kanopy.
