= Lancair Propjet =

Four-seat composite aircraft

Propjet
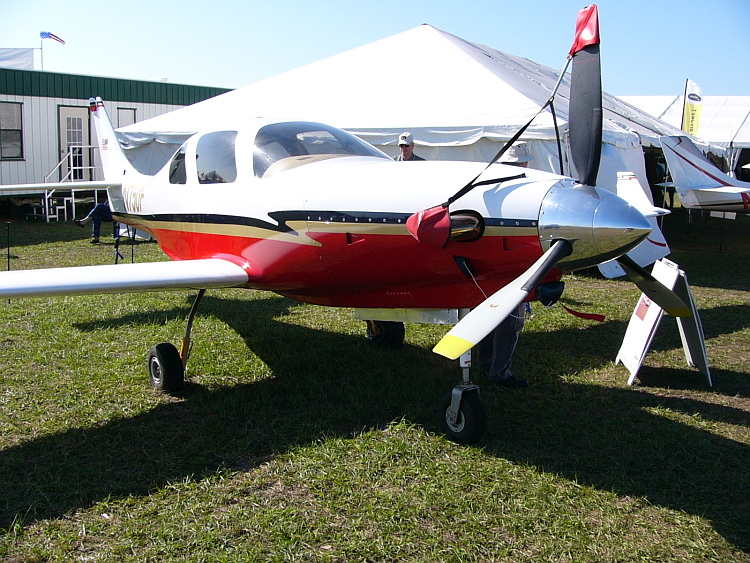

General information
- Type: Kit aircraft
- Manufacturer: Lancair
- Status: Production completed 2012

History
- Variant: Lancair IV

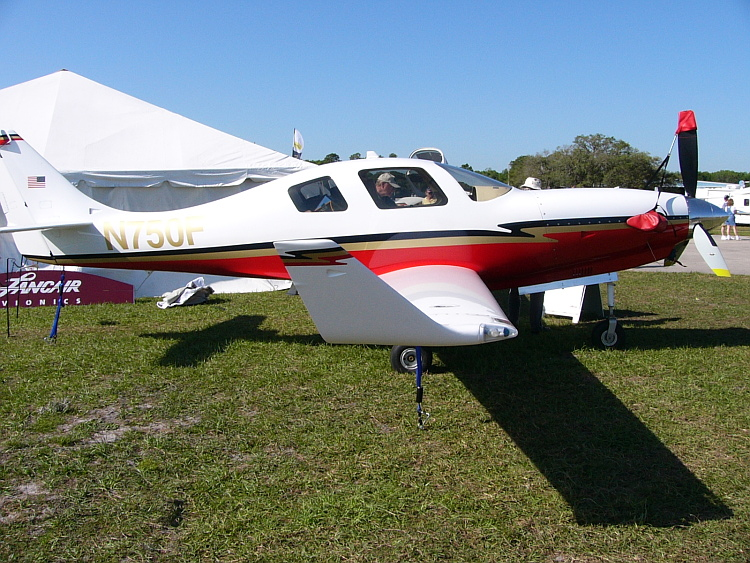
Lancair Propjet at Sun 'n Fun 2004

The Lancair Propjet is a four-seat, pressurized, composite aircraft powered by a 750-hp Walter M601E turboprop engine. The aircraft is based on Lancair's successful kit-plane, the Lancair IV. Like its piston-powered predecessor, the Propjet is noted for its performance, with a typical cruise speed of 325 knots at 24,000 feet and a climb performance of 4,000 feet per minute.

Production of the aircraft kit was ended in 2012.

== Specifications ==
General characteristics

- Crew: one
- Capacity: 3 passengers and 1,500 lb (682 kg) useful load
- Length: 26 ft 0 in (7.92 m)
- Wingspan: 30 ft 3 in (10.49 m)
- Wing area: 98 sq ft (9.10 m^{2})
- Empty weight: 2,300 lb (1,045 kg)
- Max takeoff weight: 3,800 lb (1,727 kg)
- Aspect Ratio: 9:1
- Propeller: 3 blade, constant speed
- Fuel Capacity: 125 gallons (standard); 145 gallons (extended)
- Baggage Capacity: 150 lb (68 kg)
- Cabin Width: 46 in (front); 43 in (rear)
- Height: 48 in
- Powerplant: 1 × Walter M601E-11 turbine , 750 hp (559 kW) at sea level

Performance

- Cruise speed: 325 kn (370 mph, 600 km/h) at 24,000 ft (7,317 m)
- Stall speed: 64 kn (74 mph, 120 km/h)
- Range: 1,216 nmi (1,400 mi, 2,270 km) with reserves
- Rate of climb: 7,000 ft/min (36 m/s) (solo); 4,000 ft/min (20 m/s) (gross)
- Wing loading: 39 lb/sq ft (190.7 kg/m^{2})
- Power/mass: .2 hp/lb
- Takeoff Roll: 1,200 ft (gross at sea level)
- Landing Roll: 1,400 ft
- Cross Wind Landing: 21 mph component
- Fuel Consumption: 33 gal/h (330 hp 0.67 Sfc)
- G Loading: +3.8, -1.9 g (normal)
