= Camp Sherman Community Hall =

- U.S. National Register of Historic Places
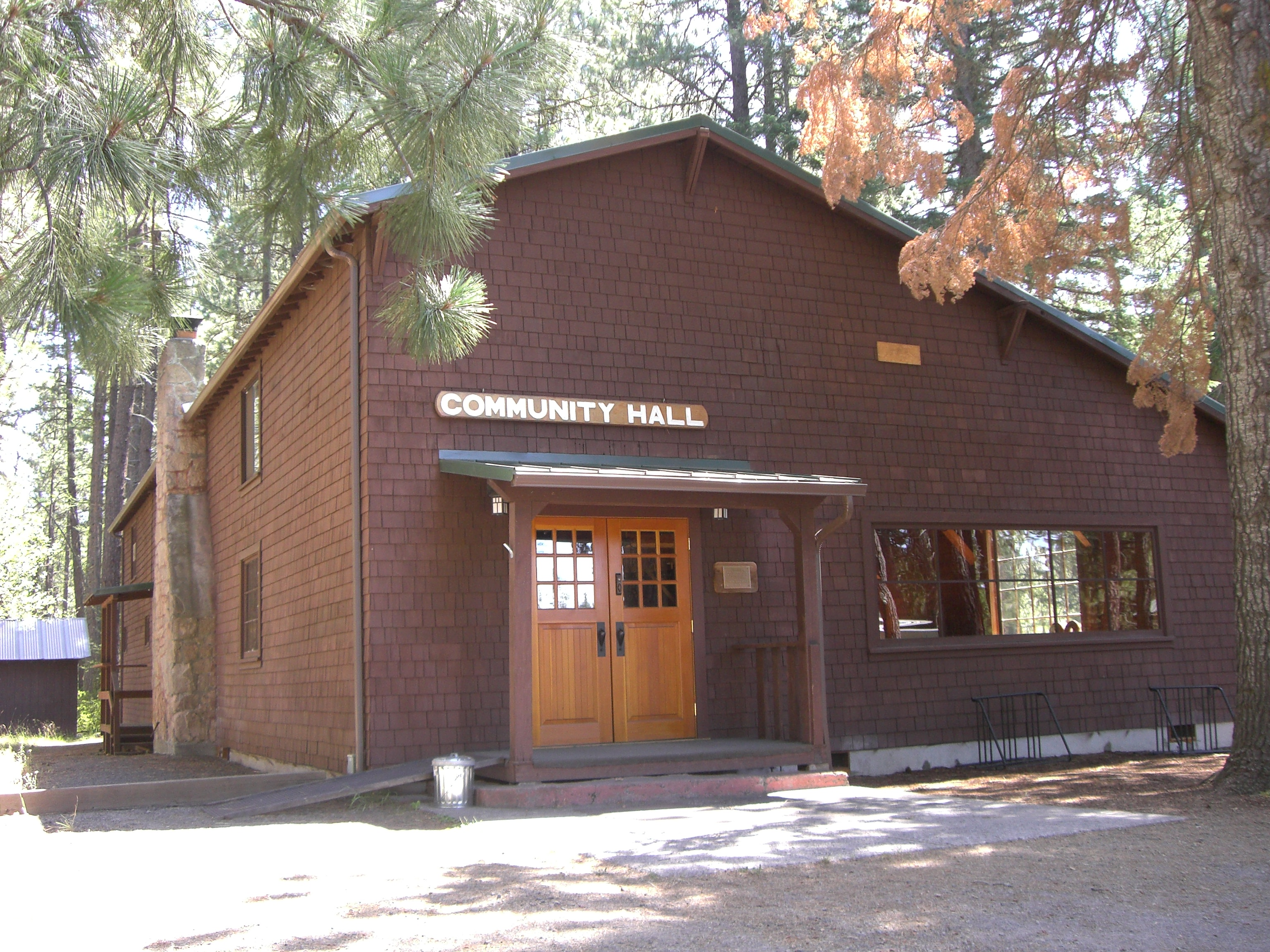
- "Camp Sherman's gathering place" in 2008

- Location within Oregon Location within the United States
- Location: Camp Sherman, Oregon
- Coordinates: 44°27′01″N 121°39′14″W
- Built: 1949
- Built by: Luther Metke
- Architect: Wayne L. Korish
- Architectural style: rustic western stick; post & beam craftsman
- NRHP reference No.: 03000070
- Added to NRHP: 2003

The Camp Sherman Community Hall is the center of social activity in the community of Camp Sherman in central Oregon. The hall hosts a variety of public and private events throughout the year. The building is owned and operated by the Camp Sherman Community Association. Because of its unique rustic architecture and importance to the history of the Camp Sherman area the hall is listed on the National Register of Historic Places.

== Structure ==
The Camp Sherman Community Hall is located in the small unincorporated community of Camp Sherman, Oregon. The hall was constructed by local volunteers under the direction of Wayne L. Korish. One of the main builders of the community hall was Luther Metke, known for his hand strewed log cabins and many bridges built in the central Oregon area. It is a simple rustic design. The building is a wood post-and-beam structure with a shingled exterior. The foundation is concrete. The roof is metal and asphalt.

The interior of the community hall has a large meeting area downstairs along with kitchen and bathroom facilities. The structural beams are hand-hewn and are exposed on the interior giving the main hall a rustic feel. The interior walls are covered with knotty pine paneling, and the floor boards are straight-grain fir. There is a large stone fireplace located on the north side of the main hall. The upstairs is an attic storage area.

== History ==
The Camp Sherman Community Association was formed in 1948 to meet the social and civic needs of the Camp Sherman community. The following year, the association built a community hall facing Camp Sherman Road on property donated by Hays and Roblay McMullin, who owned Lake Creek Lodge at that time. The project was financed by local fund raising. The building was constructed using labor donated by members of the Camp Sherman community.

Since 1949, the Camp Sherman Community Hall has been the gathering place for local residents and the venue for countless events. The hall is the site of pancake breakfast events on Memorial Day, Fourth of July, and Labor Day. It is also used for the community's Christmas bazaar, winter potluck dinners, community meetings, and well known quilt fairs held twice a year. Dances, bingo nights, and other social events are held in the hall as well. The building is also available for private events such as weddings and family reunions. During elections years, the hall is the venue for candidate forums.

Volunteers remodeled the community hall in 1983, expanding the kitchen and storage areas. Indoor plumbing was also added at the rear of the hall. During the 1990s, other improvements were made to the building including replacing the roof, installing a new propane heating system, and a new stage was built. On the outside, a lawn with picnic tables was added south of the building.

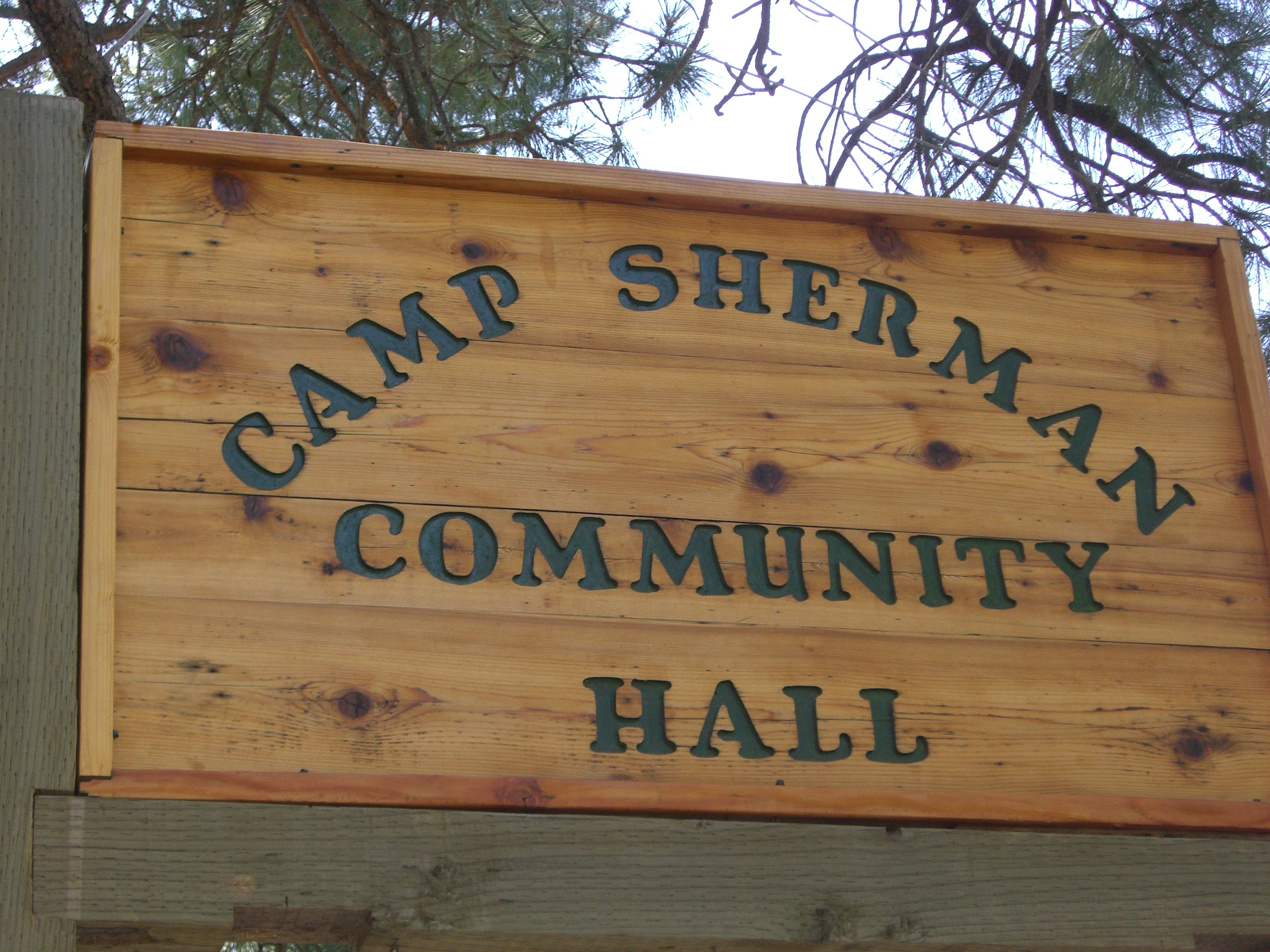
Volunteers renovated the historic hall in 2004

Because of its unique rustic architecture and importance to the social history of the Camp Sherman community the hall was listed on the National Register of Historic Places in February 2003. Listing on the National Register allows the Camp Sherman Community Association to claim federal and state tax credits. In return, the community hall must be opened for public tours at least once each year.

In 2004, volunteers from the Camp Sherman community completed a major renovation of the community hall (project photos). The project included excavations beneath the building to replace floor beams and sill plates, installation of a new heating system, and restoration and refinishing of the floor in the main hall. The fireplace and chimney were also repaired, and new front doors were installed. The projected was financed by contributions from the local community and a grant from the National Register of Historic Places.

== Camp Sherman Community Association ==
Anyone who owns property or rents a home full-time in the Black Butte School District is eligible for membership in the Camp Sherman Community Association. Membership fees are used to preserve, maintain, and operate the Camp Sherman Community Hall. Association members are eligible to rent the hall for private events such as wedding and family reunions. Members also receive a newsletter with community news and upcoming events scheduled at the hall.

According to its Articles of Incorporation, the association's purpose is:

... the establishment, maintenance, and management of an association for the promotion of social intercourse among persons living in or owning property in the Camp Sherman community; to construct, operate, and maintain a recreation hall for such purpose; to promote, aid, and assist in the civic betterment of said community; and to do all the things deemed necessary or proper to promote the welfare of said community.

Since it was built, the Camp Sherman Community Hall has played an important part in meeting the social and civic goals of the Camp Sherman Community Association.
