= Camp Sherman, Oregon =

Unincorporated community in the state of Oregon, United States

- Census-designated place
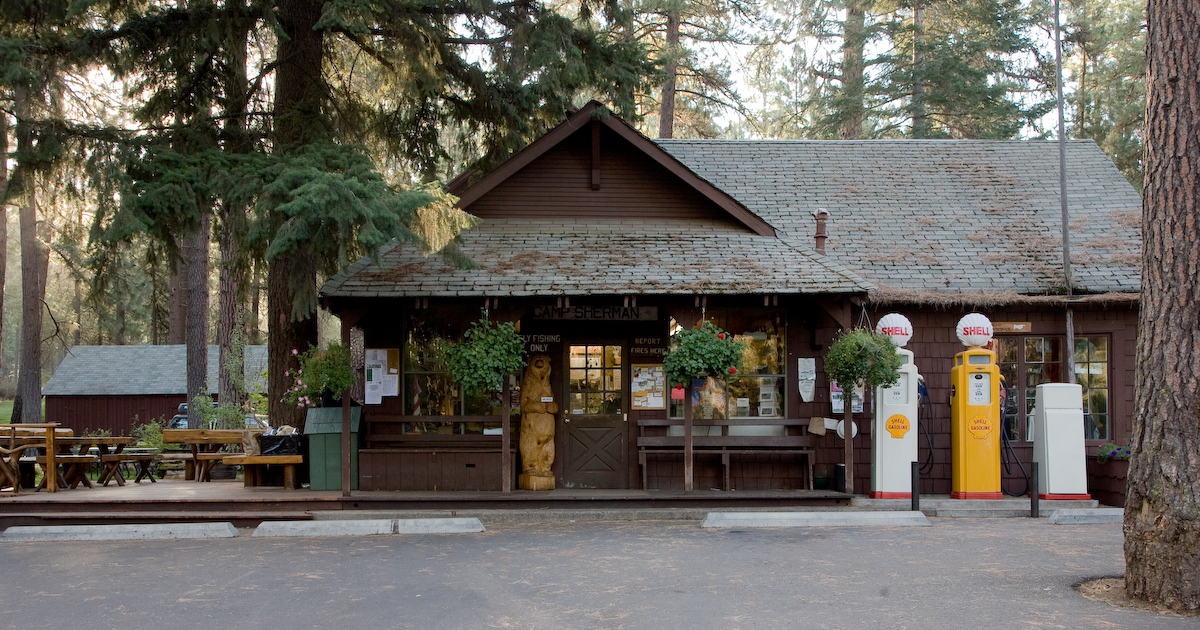
- Camp Sherman store

- Location within Oregon Location within the United States
- Coordinates: 44°27′37″N 121°38′28″W
- Country: United States
- State: Oregon
- County: Jefferson
- Named after: Sherman County, home of many families who spent their summer vacations here

Area
  - Total: 3.15 sq mi (8.16 km^{2})
  - Land: 3.15 sq mi (8.16 km^{2})
  - Water: 0 sq mi (0.00 km^{2})
- Elevation: 2,963 ft (903 m)

Population (2020)
  - Total: 251
  - Density: 79.7/sq mi (30.76/km^{2})
- Time zone: UTC-8 (PST)
  - Summer (DST): UTC-7 (PDT)
- ZIP code: 97730
- Area code: 541
- FIPS code: 41-10550
- GNIS feature ID: 1139266
- Coordinates and elevation from United States Geological Survey

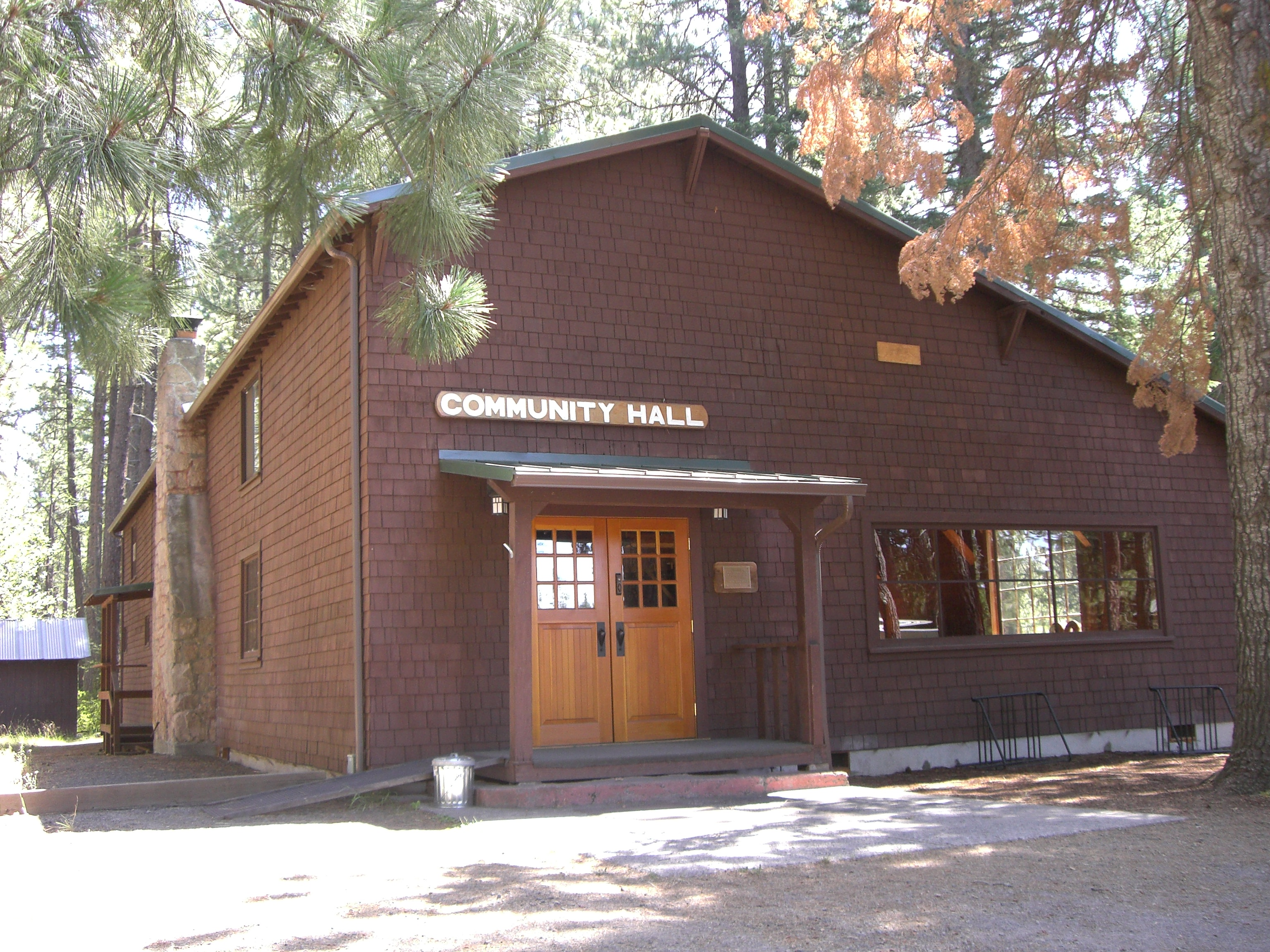
Camp Sherman Community Hall

Camp Sherman is an unincorporated community and census-designated place (CDP) in Jefferson County, Oregon, United States. It is located on the Metolius River. The year-round population as of the 2020 census was 251. with that number tripling or more during the summer. The community includes an elementary school, Black Butte School, a general store and a post office (ZIP code 97730). The community also has a volunteer fire department. Camp Sherman was founded by vacationers from Sherman County in the latter part of the 19th century.

== Demographics ==
Historical population
Census	Pop.	Note	%±
2020	251		—
U.S. Decennial Census

=== 2020 census ===
The 2020 United States census counted 251 people, 124 households, and 98 families in Camp Sherman. The population density was 79.7 per square mile (30.8/km^{2}). There were 373 housing units at an average density of 118.4 per square mile (45.7/km^{2}). The racial makeup was 91.63% (230) white or European American (89.64% non-Hispanic white), 0.0% (0) black or African-American, 1.2% (3) Native American or Alaska Native, 0.4% (1) Asian, 0.0% (0) Pacific Islander or Native Hawaiian, 0.0% (0) from other races, and 6.77% (17) from two or more races. Hispanic or Latino of any race was 5.18% (13) of the population.

Of the 124 households, 22.6% had children under the age of 18; 66.9% were married couples living together; 12.1% had a female householder with no spouse or partner present. 18.5% of households consisted of individuals and 8.1% had someone living alone who was 65 years of age or older. The average household size was 2.8 and the average family size was 3.1. The percent of those with a bachelor’s degree or higher was estimated to be 53.8% of the population.

11.2% of the population was under the age of 18, 2.0% from 18 to 24, 14.7% from 25 to 44, 31.9% from 45 to 64, and 40.2% who were 65 years of age or older. The median age was 63.1 years. For every 100 females, there were 88.7 males. For every 100 females ages 18 and older, there were 97.3 males.

The 2016–2020 5-year American Community Survey estimates show that the median household income was $77,917 (with a margin of error of +/- $18,397). The median family income was $95,625 (+/- $45,396). Males had a median income of $47,500 (+/- $14,022) versus $36,875 (+/- $13,568) for females. The median income for those above 16 years old was $39,792 (+/- $16,458). Approximately, 0.0% of the population were below the poverty line.

== Notable features ==
In 1949, Luther Metke was a key builder of the Camp Sherman Community Hall, the center of social activity in the community. In February 2003 it was listed as a National Register of Historic Places due to its rustic architecture highlighting late 19th & early 20th century American movements: Bungalow/Craftsman and Western Stick architecture.

== Climate ==
This region experiences warm (but not hot) and dry summers, with no average monthly temperatures above 71.6 °F. According to the Köppen Climate Classification system, Camp Sherman has a warm-summer Mediterranean climate, abbreviated "Csb" on climate maps.
