= Tri-R KIS TR-1 =

American homebuilt aircraft

KIS TR-1
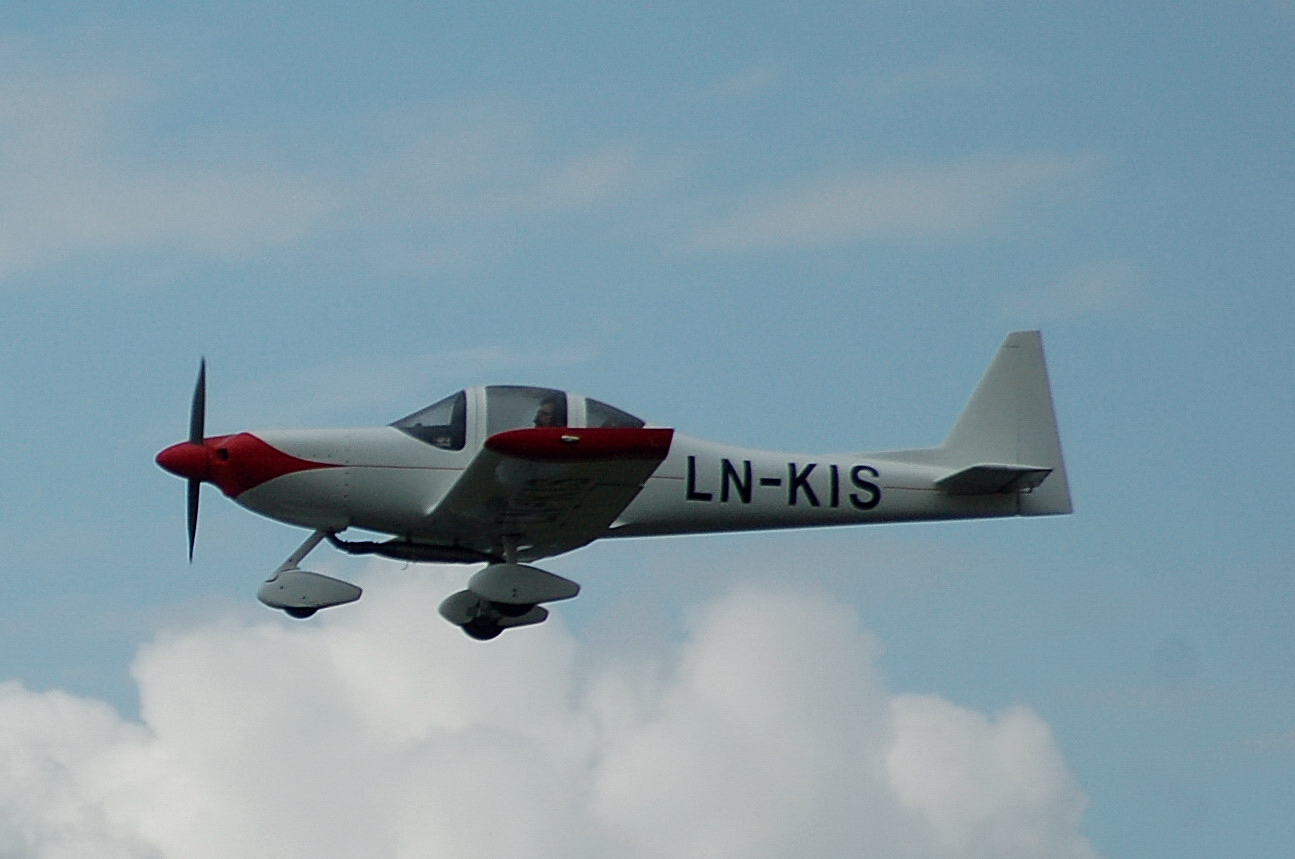

General information
- Type: Homebuilt aircraft
- National origin: United States
- Manufacturer: Tri-R Technologies
- Designer: Rich Trickel
- Status: Production completed
- Number built: At least 33

History
- Introduction date: 1990s

The Tri-R KIS TR-1 is an American homebuilt aircraft that was designed by Rich Trickel and produced by Tri-R Technologies of Oxnard, California, introduced in the 1990s. When it was available the aircraft was supplied as a kit for amateur construction.

== Design and development ==
Trickel's main business was High Tech Composites, a company that produced many airframe components under sub-contract for kit aircraft such as the Lancair 235, Lancair 320 and Lancair IV. Trickel originally drew a new aircraft as a set of three-views for a customer in Australia who was looking for a new, conventional aircraft concept. The customer liked the design, but never paid for the drawings, so Trickel brought them home and completed the design work himself. Eventually the new design became the KIS TR-1.

The KIS TR-1 features a cantilever low-wing, a two-seats-in-side-by-side configuration enclosed cockpit accessed via gull-wing doors, fixed tricycle landing gear or optionally conventional landing gear with wheel pants and a single engine in tractor configuration.

The aircraft is made from composites. Its 23.00 ft (7.0 m) span rectangular wing employs a NACA 63-215 airfoil, mounts flaps and has a wing area of 88.00 sq ft (8.175 m^{2}). The acceptable power range is 80 to 125 hp (60 to 93 kW) and the standard engines used are the 125 hp (93 kW) Continental O-240, the 108 hp (81 kW) Lycoming O-235-C1B or the 80 hp (60 kW) Limbach L2000 powerplant.

The KIS TR-1 has a typical empty weight of 750 lb (340 kg) and a gross weight of 1,300 lb (590 kg), giving a useful load of 550 lb (250 kg). With full fuel of 20 U.S. gallons (76 L; 17 imp gal) the payload for the pilot, passenger and baggage is 430 lb (200 kg).

The standard day, sea level, no wind, take off with a 125 hp (93 kW) engine is 600 ft (183 m) and the landing roll is 1,200 ft (366 m).

The manufacturer estimated the construction time from the supplied kit as 1000 hours.

== Variants ==
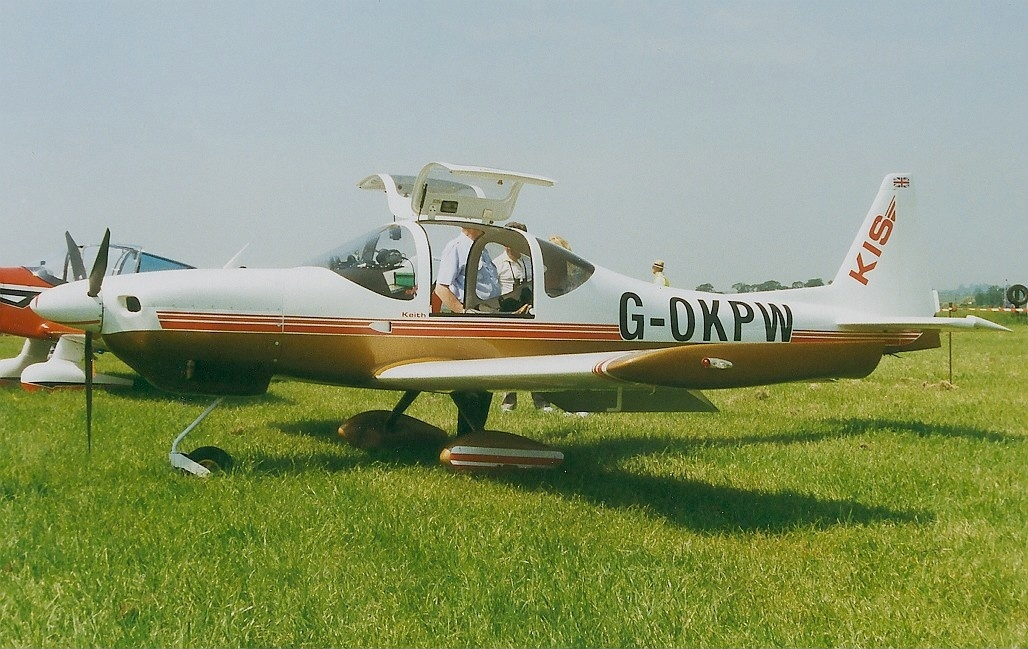
KIS TR-1

KIS TR-1
Original model with tricycle landing gear and a gross weight of 1,300 lb (590 kg). By 1998 the company reported that 25 aircraft were completed and flying. In March 2014 ten examples were registered in the United States with the Federal Aviation Administration, although a total of 13 had been registered at one time. Also in March 2014 there were seven registered in the United Kingdom with the CAA.

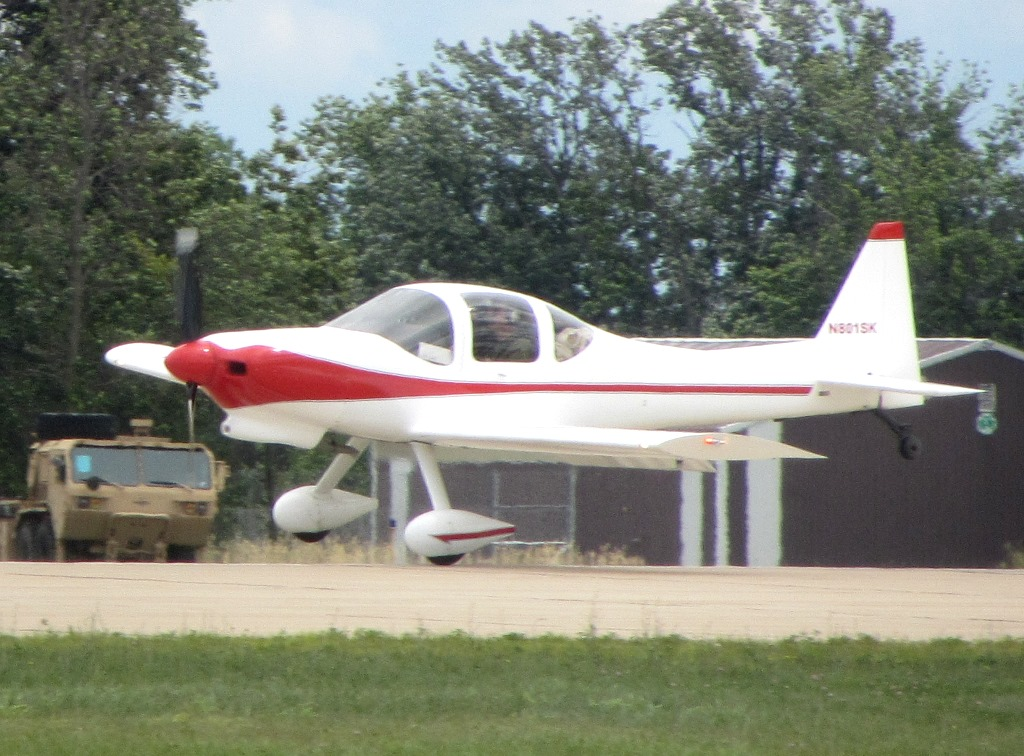
TR-1/TD

KIS TR-1/TD
Conventional landing gear-equipped version ("Taildragger"), with an empty weight of 800 lb (360 kg) and a gross weight of 1,425 lb (646 kg). Fuel is 34 U.S. gallons (130 L; 28 imp gal). By 1998 the company reported that eight aircraft were completed and flying.

== Specifications (KIS TR-1) ==
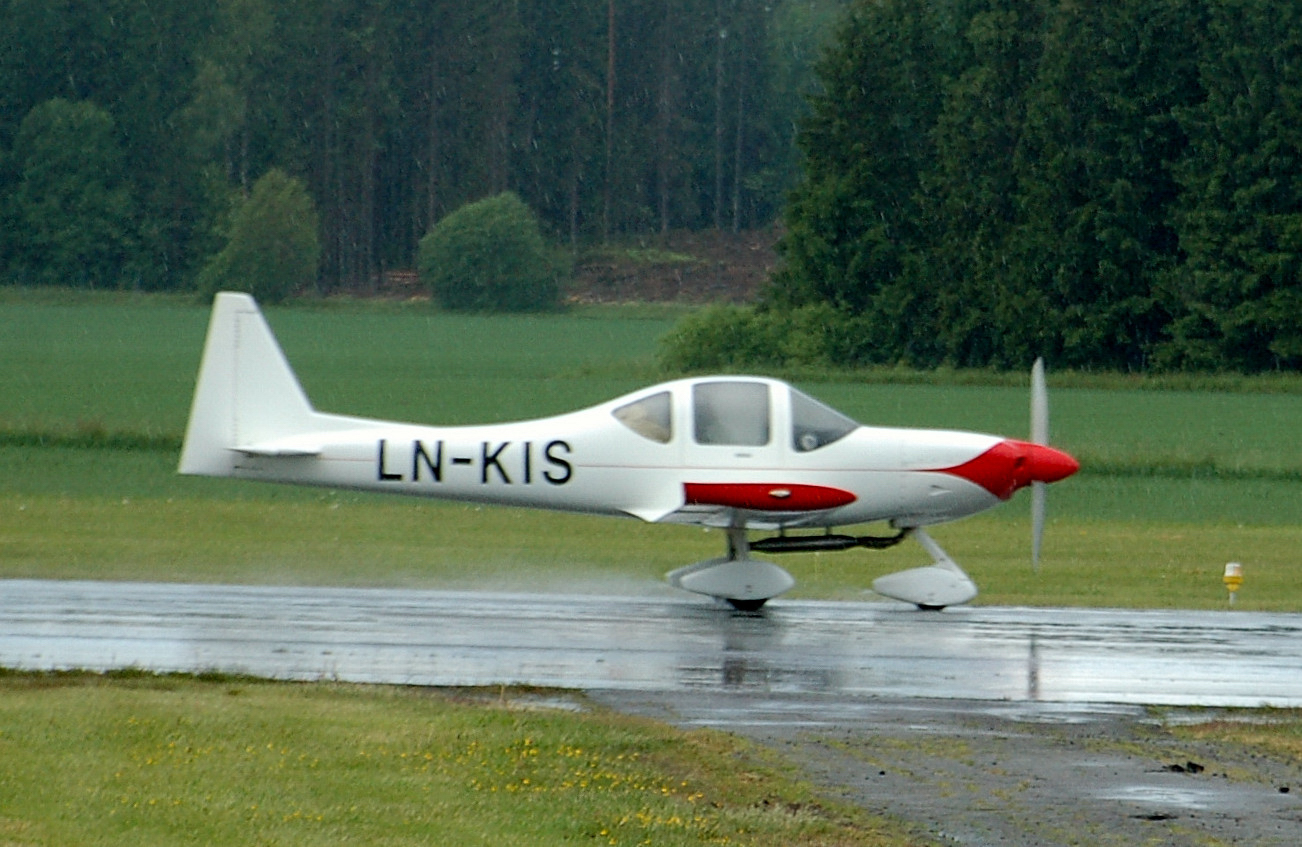
KIS TR-1

Data from AeroCrafter and The Incomplete Guide to Airfoil Usage

General characteristics

- Crew: one
- Capacity: one passenger
- Length: 22 ft 0 in (6.71 m)
- Wingspan: 23 ft 0 in (7.01 m)
- Wing area: 88.00 sq ft (8.175 m^{2})
- Airfoil: NACA 63-215
- Empty weight: 750 lb (340 kg)
- Gross weight: 1,300 lb (590 kg)
- Fuel capacity: 20 U.S. gallons (76 L; 17 imp gal)
- Powerplant: 1 × Continental O-240 four cylinder, air-cooled, four stroke aircraft engine, 125 hp (93 kW)
- Propellers: 2-bladed fixed pitch

Performance

- Maximum speed: 195 mph (314 km/h, 169 kn)
- Cruise speed: 175 mph (282 km/h, 152 kn)
- Stall speed: 55 mph (89 km/h, 48 kn)
- Range: 750 mi (1,210 km, 650 nmi)
- Service ceiling: 17,000 ft (5,200 m)
- Rate of climb: 1,200 ft/min (6.1 m/s)
- Wing loading: 14.8 lb/sq ft (72 kg/m^{2})
