= Tri-R Technologies =

American aircraft manufacturer

- Company type: Private company
- Industry: Aerospace
- Fate: Out of business
- Headquarters: Oxnard, California
- Key people: Richard Trickel
- Products: Kit aircraft

Tri-R Technologies was an American aircraft manufacturer that produced kit aircraft for homebuilt construction.

Tri-R Technologies was founded by Richard Trickel to develop composite homebuilt aircraft kits that were in the middle of the price and performance range averages. The company's first products were composite subassemblies for Berkut aircraft and Lancair 235, Lancair 320 and Lancair IV homebuilts. The company's aircraft products were named KIS, short for "Keep it Simple".

Trickel originally drew a new aircraft as a set of three-views for a customer in Australia who was looking for a new, conventional aircraft concept. The customer liked the design, but never paid for the drawings, so Trickel brought them home and completed the design work himself. Eventually the new design became the Tri-R KIS TR-1.

== Aircraft ==
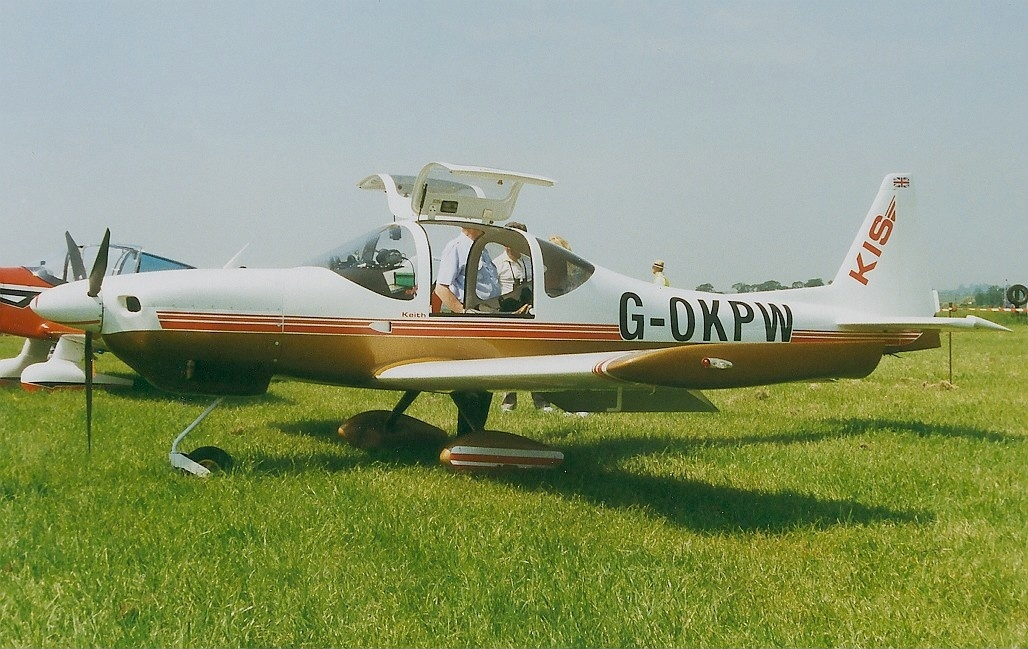
KIS TR-1

Summary of aircraft kits built by Tri-R Technologies Inc.
Model name	First flight	Number built	Type
KIS TR-1	1991	130	Two place composite homebuilt
KIS Cruiser TR-4	1994	60	Four place composite homebuilt
