= Ottawa Executive Airport =

Public use airport in Zeeland, Michigan

- IATA: none; ICAO: none; FAA LID: Z98

Summary
- Location: Zeeland, MI
- Time zone: UTC−05:00 (-5)
  - Summer (DST): UTC−04:00 (-4)
- Elevation AMSL: 756 ft / 230 m
- Coordinates: 42°49′00″N 085°55′41″W
- Interactive map of Ottawa Executive Airport

Runways
Direction	Length		Surface
Direction	ft	m	Surface
2/20	3,800	1,158	Asphalt

Statistics (2021)
- Aircraft Movements: 13,140

Ottawa Executive Airport (FAA LID: Z98) is a privately owned, public use airport located 3 miles east of Zeeland, Michigan.

The airport hosts a variety of events for the community. Around Halloween, children are invited to trick-or-treat at the airport.

== Facilities and aircraft ==
The airport has one runway. It is designated as runway 2/20 and measures 3800 x 60 ft (1158 x 18 m). It is paved with asphalt. For the 12-month period ending December 31, 2021, the airport had 13,140 aircraft operations, an average of 36 per day. It is entirely general aviation. For the same time period, there were 48 aircraft based at the airport: 41 single-engine airplanes and 6 multi-engine airplanes as well as 1 helicopter.

The airport has a fixed-base operator that offers fuel – both avgas and jet fuel – as well as general maintenance, hangars, courtesy transportation, conference rooms, a crew lounge, and more.

== Accidents and incidents ==
- On August 11, 2005, a Cessna 172S received substantial damage on impact with terrain during a hard landing at Ottawa Executive Airport. The pilot reported she did not flare enough during the landing.
- On August 13, 2005, a North American Navion A received substantial damage on impact with terrain following a total loss of engine power after takeoff from Ottawa Executive Airport. The pilot departed from runway 02, and about 100-150 feet above ground level, the airplane experienced a total loss of engine power. The cause of the engine failure was found to be a fuel selector valve leak.
- On June 27, 2016, an Enstrom 208FX helicopter experienced an engine fire while preparing for departure from the Ottawa Executive Airport. The flight instructor reported that the student pilot was on his first flight. After a preflight inspection, they started the helicopter's engine and prepared for takeoff. Before increasing collective, the instructor noticed the lights on the panel flicker and smelled smoke. About the same time, the instructor also observed ground personnel running toward the helicopter. Both he and the student exited the helicopter and ground personnel were able to extinguish an engine fire. The cause of the incident was found to be an exhaust band clamp failure, which resulted in an engine fire due to hot exhaust gases entering the engine compartment.
- On May 5, 2019, a Glasair RG was damaged during landing at Ottawa Executive Airport when it landed with its nose landing gear retracted. The pilot landed safely and survived the incident.
- On September 19, 2020, a Vans RV9 crashed at the airport due to the pilot's inability to maintain a minimum airspeed for flight. The pilot had taken off from the airport early in the morning and attempted to return after departure. But the plane stalled and spun into the ground. In his autopsy, it was found the pilot had died of coronary heart disease, but it is unclear whether this was the cause of the crash.
- On June 29, 2025, an experimental Lancair 360 crashed just after departure. The sole pilot onboard was killed. The crash is under investigation.

== See also ==
- List of airports in Michigan
