= Lancair 235 =

American light kit airplane

200 & 235
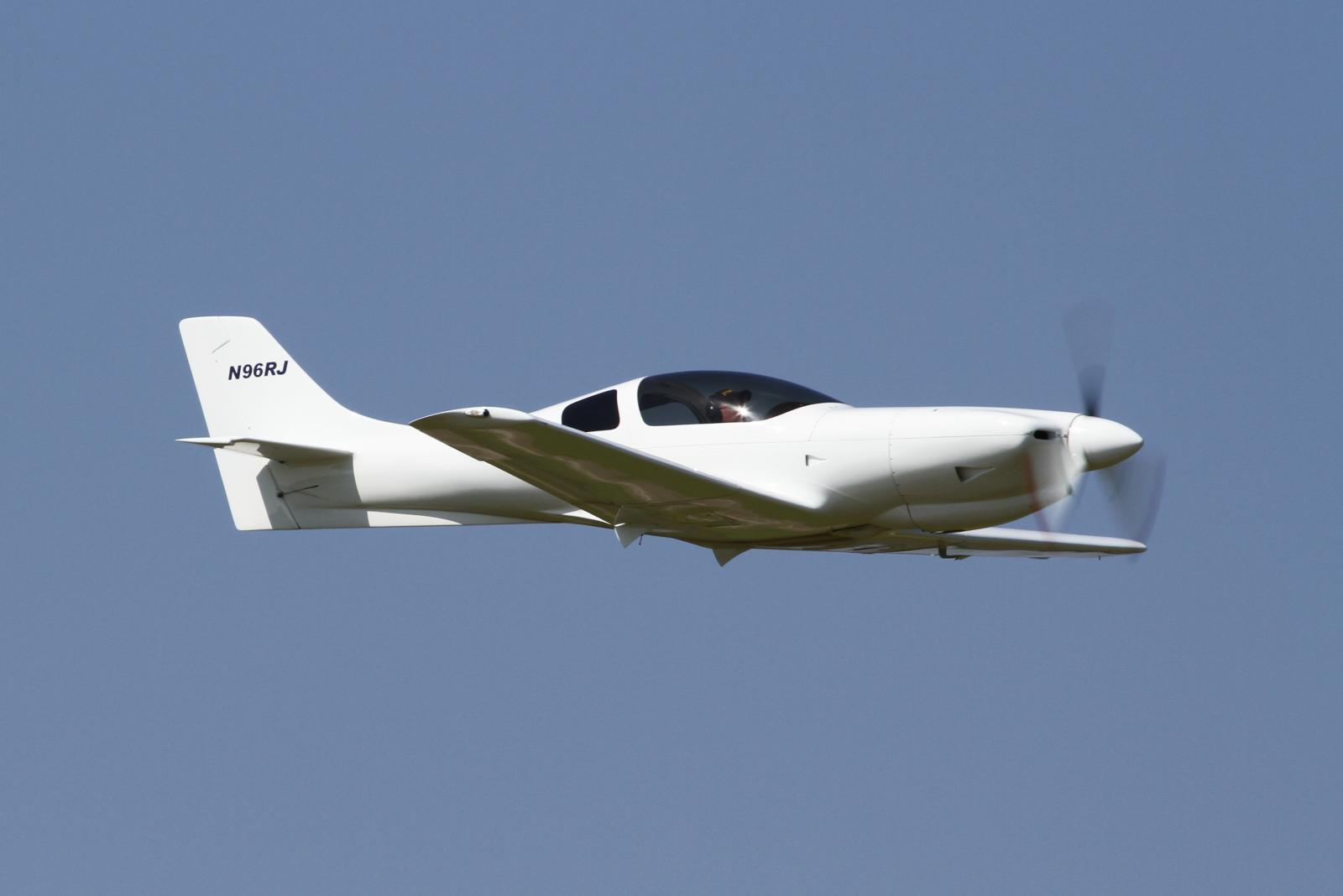
- Lancair 235

General information
- Type: Amateur-built aircraft
- National origin: United States
- Manufacturer: Lancair
- Designer: Lance Neibauer
- Status: Production completed
- Number built: at least 59

History
- Introduction date: 1985
- First flight: 1984
- Variants: Lancair 320; Lancair 360; Lancair Legacy; Lancair Barracuda

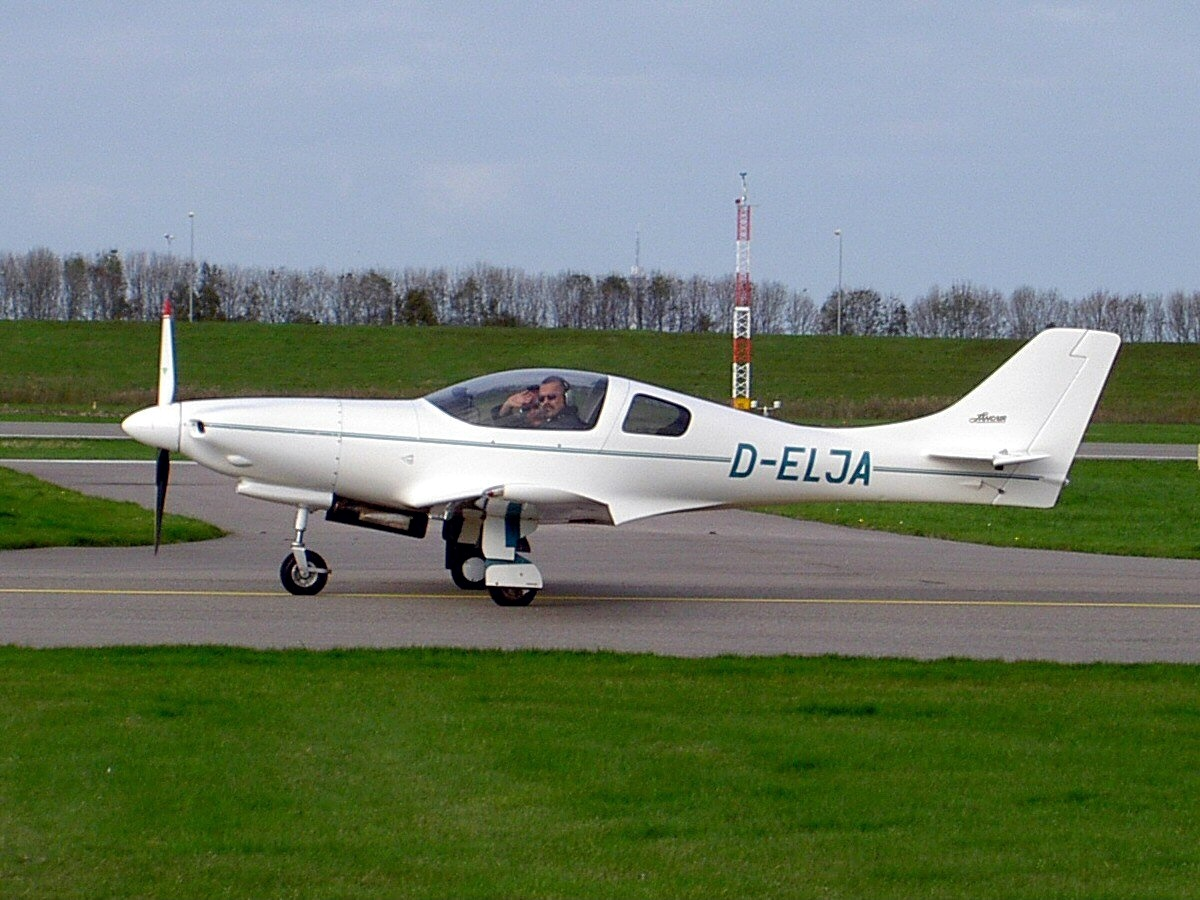
Lancair 235

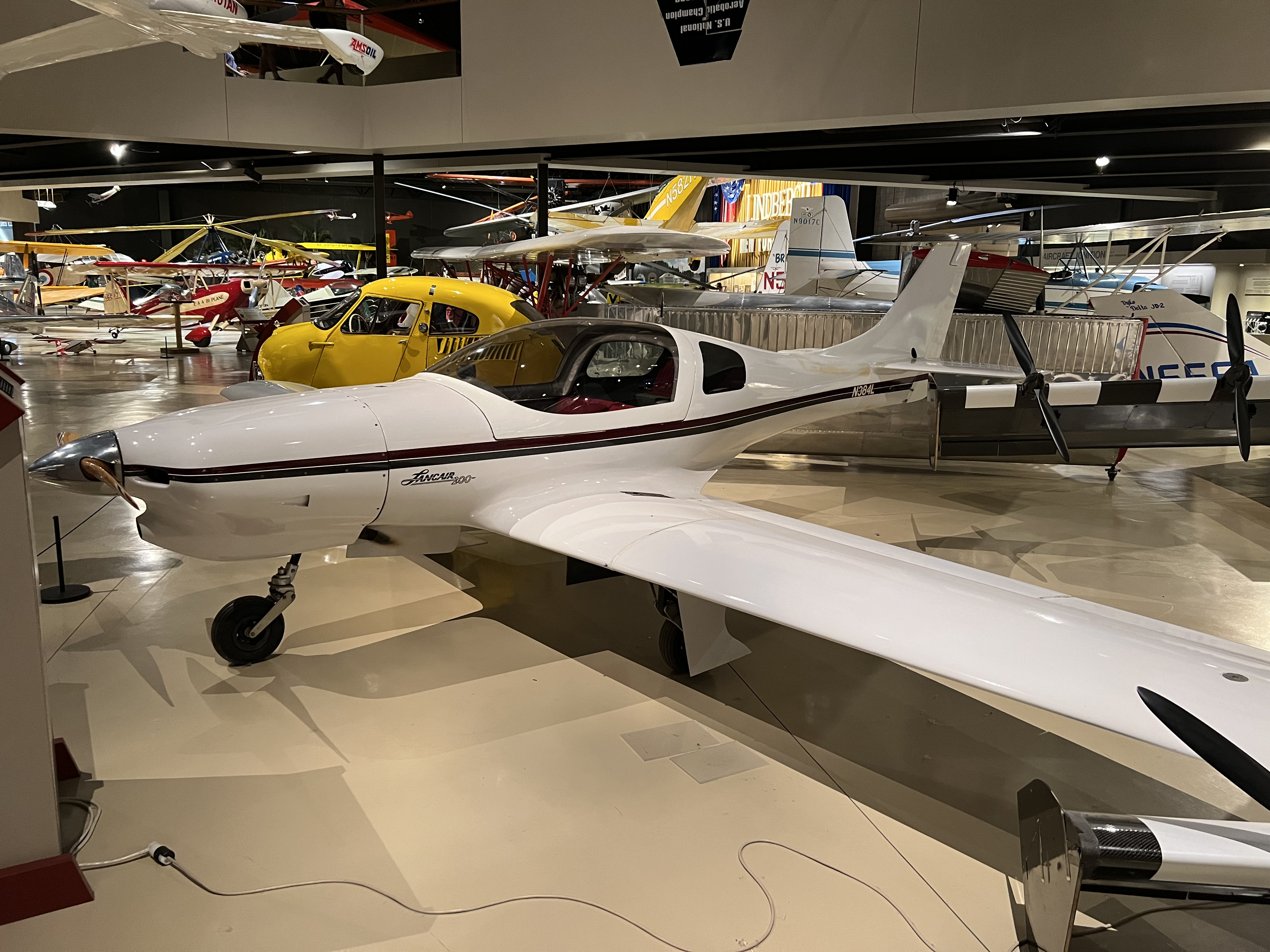
Lancair 200

The Lancair 200 and Lancair 235 are a family of American amateur-built aircraft that were designed by Lance Neibauer and produced by his company, Lancair of Redmond, Oregon. The Lancair 200 was initially called the Lancer 200, but the name was changed due to a naming conflict. It was first shown at AirVenture in Oshkosh, Wisconsin in July 1985. Now out of production, when it was available the aircraft was supplied as a kit, for amateur construction.

The design later evolved into the Lancair 320, Lancair 360 and the Lancair Legacy, all ancestors of the Lancair Barracuda.

== Design and development ==
Neibauer, a fine arts graduate from Michigan State University, designed the 200 because he found the existing production aircraft in the 1980s uninteresting. "That was my primary motivation for starting on the Lancair 200 in the first place, to build what I hoped would be an aesthetically more pleasing design with better performance and handling." The prototype was intended as a "one-off" aircraft for his own use and not for production. Neibauer bought a Cessna 150 and salvaged the engine, instruments and avionics, selling the airframe. After displaying the Lancair 200 at Oshkosh in 1985, the design generated a high degree of interest and he began selling kits, initially under the company name of Neico.

The aircraft features a cantilever low-wing, a two-seats-in-side-by-side configuration enclosed cockpit under a bubble canopy, retractable tricycle landing gear and a single engine in tractor configuration.

The prototype was made of urethane and hot wire cut styrofoam, all covered with wet lay-up fiberglass skin. The production aircraft is made from composite materials, including DuPont Nomex honeycomb structure, some graphite parts and epoxy-impregnated fiberglass cloth for covering. Its 23.5 ft (7.2 m) span wing employs a NASA NLF(1)-0215F natural laminar flow airfoil and mounts flaps. The standard engines used are the 100 hp (75 kW) Continental O-200 on the Lancair 200 and the 100 to 115 hp (75 to 86 kW) Lycoming O-235 powerplant on the Lancair 235. The 125 to 140 hp (93 to 104 kW) Lycoming O-290 engine has also been used. The two models are otherwise identical.

The manufacturer estimated the kit construction time as 600 person-hours.

== Operational history ==
By April 2019, there were two examples of the Lancair 200, registered in the United States with the Federal Aviation Administration, plus 50 Lancair 235s. In April 2019 there were six Lancair 235s registered with Transport Canada and one Lancair 235 registered with the British Civil Aviation Authority.

== Variants ==
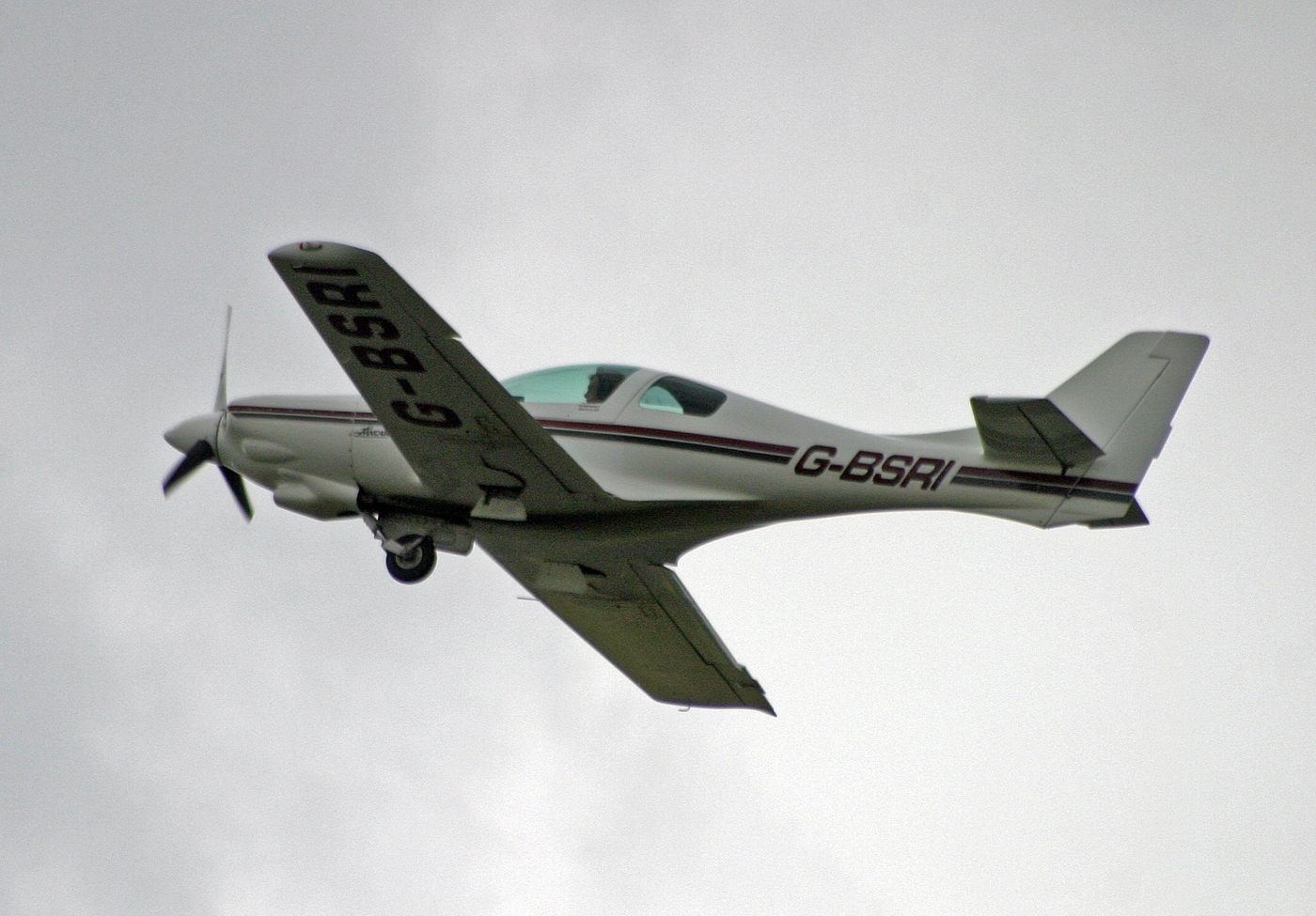
Lancair 235 during landing gear retraction sequence

Lancair 200
Model first flown in 1984, powered by a 100 hp (75 kW) Continental O-200 engine. Overall length is 19.75 ft (6.02 m).
Lancair 235
Model introduced in 1985, powered by a 100 to 115 hp (75 to 86 kW) Lycoming O-235 engine. Overall length is 20.00 ft (6.10 m), slightly longer than the 200, due to the engine and mount dimensions.

== Aircraft on display ==
- EAA Aviation Museum, Oshkosh, Wisconsin, Prototype Lancair 200
- Planes of Fame Air Museum, Chino, California, Lancair 235

== Specifications (Lancair 235) ==

Data from All Aero

General characteristics

- Crew: one
- Capacity: one passenger
- Length: 20 ft 0 in (6.10 m)
- Wingspan: 23 ft 6 in (7.16 m)
- Airfoil: NASA NLF(1)-0215F
- Powerplant: 1 × Lycoming O-235 four cylinder, air-cooled, four stroke aircraft engine, 100 hp (75 kW)
- Propellers: 2-bladed fixed pitch

Performance

- Maximum speed: 160 kn (180 mph, 300 km/h)
- Cruise speed: 140 kn (160 mph, 260 km/h)
- Stall speed: 55 kn (63 mph, 102 km/h)
- Never exceed speed: 235 kn (270 mph, 435 km/h)
- Range: 870 nmi (1,000 mi, 1,600 km)
- g limits: +9/-4.5 g ultimate load
- Rate of climb: 1,300 ft/min (6.6 m/s)
