= Tri-R KIS TR-4 Cruiser =

4 seater plane

KIS TR-4 Cruiser
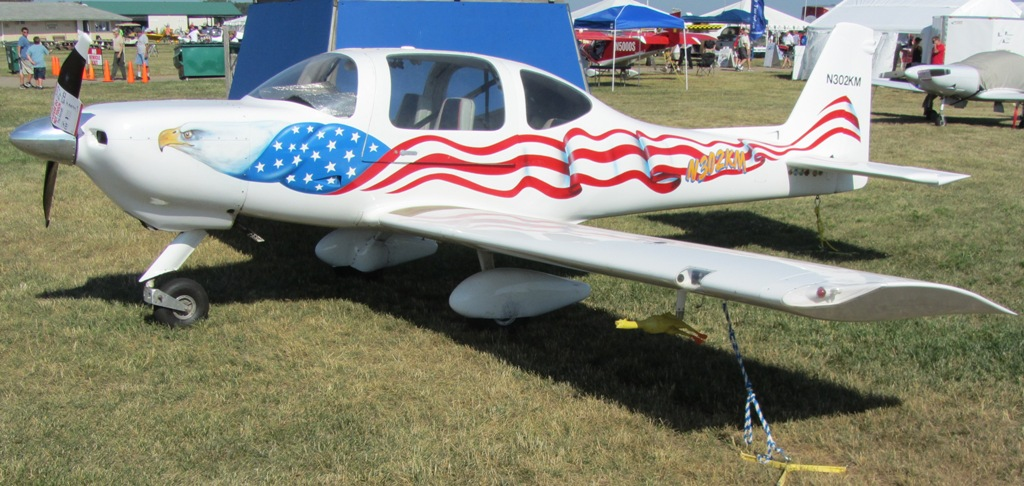

General information
- Type: Homebuilt aircraft
- National origin: United States
- Manufacturer: Tri-R Technologies
- Designer: Rich Trickel

History
- First flight: 1994
- Developed from: Tri-R KIS TR-1

The KIS TR-4 Cruiser is a four place composite homebuilt aircraft design.

== Design and development ==
The KIS cruiser is an all composite tricycle gear, low-wing, four-place homebuilt aircraft.

== Variants ==
Super Sport Cruiser
Version powered by a 210 hp Continental IO-360 with a constant speed propeller

== Specifications (KIS TR-4 Cruiser) ==
Data from Plane and Pilot.

General characteristics

- Crew: 1
- Capacity: 4 passengers
- Wing area: 135 sq ft (12.5 m^{2})
- Airfoil: NACA 63(2)-215
- Empty weight: 1,200 lb (544 kg)
- Gross weight: 2,400 lb (1,089 kg)
- Fuel capacity: 50 U.S. gallons (190 L; 42 imp gal)
- Powerplant: 1 × Lycoming IO-360 horizontally opposed piston, 180 hp (130 kW)

Performance

- Maximum speed: 161 kn (185 mph, 298 km/h)
- Cruise speed: 143 kn (165 mph, 266 km/h)
- Range: 700 nmi (800 mi, 1,300 km)
- Service ceiling: 17,000 ft (5,200 m)
- Rate of climb: 1,200 ft/min (6.1 m/s)
- Wing loading: 17.78 lb/sq ft (86.8 kg/m^{2})

== See also ==
Aircraft of comparable role, configuration, and era

- Lancair ES
