= Volato Aeronaves =

Airplane manufacturer in the Brazil

- Company type: Private
- Industry: Aerospace
- Founded: 1999
- Headquarters: Lençóis Paulista, São Paulo, Brazil
- Products: Airplanes

Volato Aeronaves also known as Volato Aeronaves e Compósitos Ltda is a Brazilian aircraft manufacturer.

== History ==
The founders of the company, Zizo Sola and Marcos Vilela, worked with Richard Allen Trickel Jr. in the USA in the 1990s. Richard Allen Trickel Jr. was the designer of the KIS 2, KIS 4, KIS Cruiser, Super Pulsar and Pulsar Super Cruiser aircraft, of which more than 300 were built. The idea of founding an experimental aircraft factory in Brazil arose from this collaboration. Together they first developed the Volato 400, a modern four-seater made of composite materials. They are currently working on a further development of the machine, the Volato 200, a two-seater.

The company also produces composite parts for Embraer.

== Aircraft ==
Summary of aircraft built by Volato
Model name	First flight	Number built	Type
Volato 200			Two seat light-sport aircraft
Volato 400			Four seat light-sport aircraft

== See also ==
- Tri-R Technologies
- Companhia Aeronáutica Paulista
- Aero Bravo
