= Lycoming IO-390 =

Four-cylinder aircraft engine

IO-390
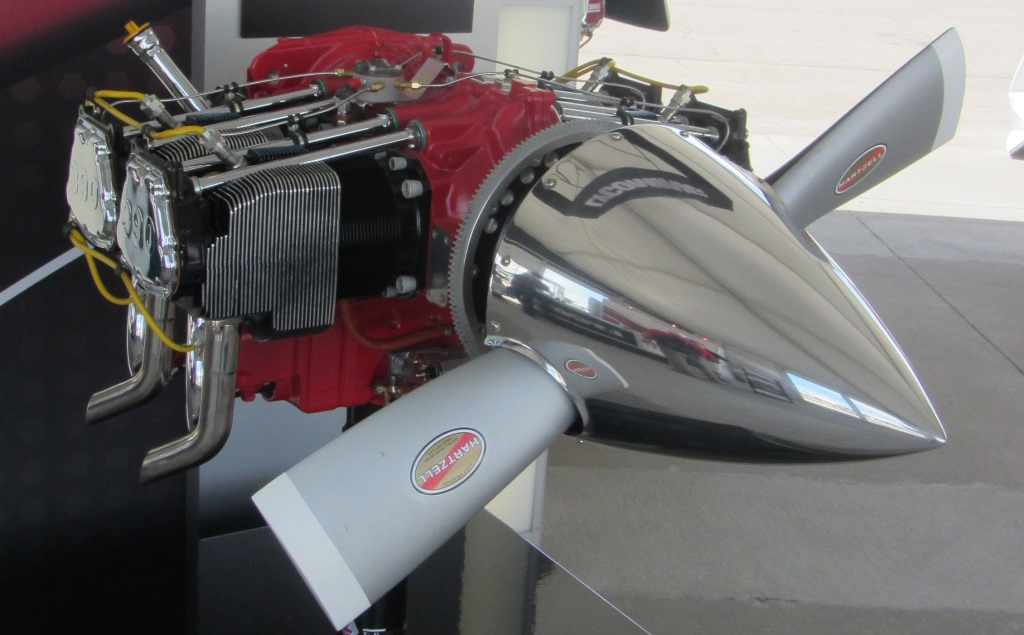
- Type: Piston aero-engine
- National origin: United States
- Manufacturer: Lycoming Engines
- First run: 2002
- Major applications: Cirrus SR20; Tecnam P2010
- Manufactured: 2009–present
- Developed from: Lycoming IO-360; Lycoming IO-580

The Lycoming IO-390 engine is a horizontally opposed, four-cylinder aircraft engine, manufactured by Lycoming Engines.

There is no carburetted version of the engine, which would have been designated O-390 and therefore the base model is the IO-390.

== Design and development ==
The engine was originally conceived in the 1970s as the IO-400-X, but the project was never pursued.

The IO-390 family of engines, which Lycoming refers to as the IO-390-X, produce 200 hp (149 kW) to 215 hp (160 kW). The IO-390 was developed from the similar IO-360 engine, by using cylinders from the IO-580 to increase the O-360's cylinder bore. (Although the IO-390 cylinder assembly is not the same part number as the IO-580, the cylinder barrels of both have a 5.318 bore and 4.375 stroke dimension.)

It features a tuned induction system, roller tappets and Slick Start ignition. The engine has a fuel injection system which meters fuel in proportion to the induction airflow with fuel vaporization taking place at the intake ports. The engine has a displacement of 390 cubic inches (6.39 litres). The cylinders have air-cooled heads.

The IO-390 was first introduced at AirVenture 2002. It has a factory recommended TBO of 2000 hours and requires a dynafocal engine mount.

The IO-390 was initially marketed through Lycoming's custom engine subsidiary, Thunderbolt Engines, prior to the engine's certification and was at that time only available for installation on non-certified aircraft. The IO-390 was certified on 30 March 2009 to FAR 33.

In January 2009 the base price of the IO-390-EXP version was USD$32,650.00.

In November 2009 Lycoming announced that it had obtained an FAA Supplemental Type Certificate to replace the originally fitted Lycoming O-360 engines in the Mooney M20E, M20F and M20J with a new or remanufactured IO-390-A3A6 engine. Also on November 12, 2009 Commander Aircraft received an STC for its model 112B using the MTV-12-B/188-59b propeller.

== Variants ==
=== IO-390 models ===
IO-390-X
Four-cylinder, fuel-injected, horizontally opposed, air-cooled direct drive, 390 cubic inches (6.39 litres), 210 hp (157 kW) at 2700 rpm, dry weight 308 lb (140 kg), The "X" designation is a generic indicator for all engines in the family.
IO-390-EXP
Four-cylinder, fuel-injected, horizontally opposed, air-cooled direct drive, 390 cubic inches (6.39 litres), 210 hp (157 kW) at 2700 rpm, dry weight 308 lb (140 kg), non-certified engine for experimental aircraft assembled by Lycoming's Thunderbolt division.
IO-390-A1A6
The initial certified version: four-cylinder, fuel-injected, horizontally opposed, air-cooled direct drive, 390 cubic inches (6.39 litres), 210 hp (157 kW) at 2700 rpm. This model includes provisions for a single-action controllable-pitch propeller. Certified 30 March 2009.
IO-390-A1B6
Certified version: four-cylinder, fuel-injected, horizontally opposed, air-cooled direct drive, 390 cubic inches (6.39 litres), 210 hp (157 kW) at 2700 rpm. Same as the A1A6, except that the propeller governor is located on left front of crankcase. Certified 21 January 2010.
IO-390-A3A6
Certified version: four-cylinder, fuel-injected, horizontally opposed, air-cooled direct drive, 390 cubic inches (6.39 litres), 210 hp (157 kW) at 2700 rpm. This model includes provisions for a single-action controllable-pitch propeller. This model is similar to the A1A6 but has its propeller flange bushings reindexed. Certified 27 August 2009.
IO-390-A3B6
Certified version: four-cylinder, fuel-injected, horizontally opposed, air-cooled direct drive, 390 cubic inches (6.39 litres), 210 hp (157 kW) at 2700 rpm. Same as the A3A6 except that the propeller governor is located on left front of the crankcase. Certified 5 April 2012.
IO-390-C1A6
Certified version: four-cylinder, fuel-injected, horizontally opposed, air-cooled direct drive, 390 cubic inches (6.39 litres), 215 hp (160 kW) at 2700 rpm. This model is similar to the IO-390-A1A6, except with a lightweight oil sump, cold air induction housing, tuned intake pipes and an RSA-10 fuel injector. Certified 25 January 2016.
IO-390-C1B6
Certified version: four-cylinder, fuel-injected, horizontally opposed, air-cooled direct drive, 390 cubic inches (6.39 litres), 215 hp (160 kW) at 2700 rpm. This model is the same as the C1A6, except that the propeller governor is located on left front of the crankcase. Certified 25 January 2016.
IO-390-C3A6
Certified version: four-cylinder, fuel-injected, horizontally opposed, air-cooled direct drive, 390 cubic inches (6.39 litres), 215 hp (160 kW) at 2700 rpm. This model is the same as the C1A6, except that the propeller flange bushings are reindexed. Certified 25 January 2016.
IO-390-C3B6
Certified four-cylinder, fuel-injected, horizontally opposed, air-cooled direct drive, 390 cubic inches (6.39 litres), 215 hp (160 kW) at 2,700 rpm, dry weight 296 lb (134 kg). This model is the same as the C3A6, except that the propeller governor is located on left front of the crankcase. Used on Cirrus SR20 G6.

=== AEIO-390 models ===
AEIO-390-A1A6
Certified version: aerobatic, four-cylinder, fuel-injected, horizontally opposed, air-cooled direct drive, 390 cubic inches (6.39 litres), 210 hp (157 kW) at 2700 rpm. This model is the same as IO-390-A1A6, except that it is equipped with an inverted oil system kit for aerobatic flight. Certified 5 April 2012.
AEIO-390-A1B6
Certified version: aerobatic, four-cylinder, fuel-injected, horizontally opposed, air-cooled direct drive, 390 cubic inches (6.39 litres), 210 hp (157 kW) at 2700 rpm. This model is the same as IO-390-A1B6, except that it is equipped with an inverted oil system kit for aerobatic flight. Certified 5 April 2012.
AEIO-390-A3A6
Certified version: aerobatic, four-cylinder, fuel-injected, horizontally opposed, air-cooled direct drive, 390 cubic inches (6.39 litres), 210 hp (157 kW) at 2700 rpm. This model is the same as IO-390-A3A6, except that it is equipped with an inverted oil system kit for aerobatic flight. Certified 5 April 2012.
AEIO-390-A3B6
Certified version: aerobatic, four-cylinder, fuel-injected, horizontally opposed, air-cooled direct drive, 390 cubic inches (6.39 litres), 210 hp (157 kW) at 2700 rpm. This model is the same as IO-390-A3B6, except that it is equipped with an inverted oil system kit for aerobatic flight. Certified 5 April 2012.

== Applications ==
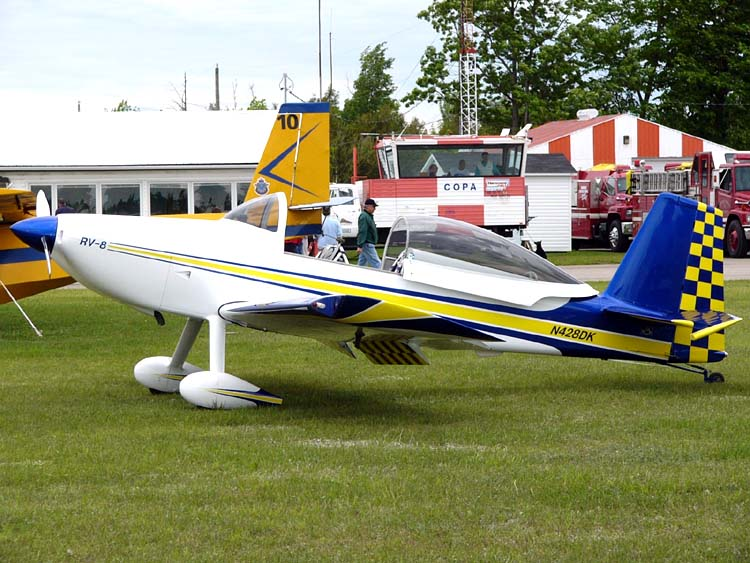
Van's Aircraft RV-8s have been fitted with the IO-390 engine

Amateur-built aircraft

- Bearhawk Companion
- Glasair Sportsman
- Ibis GS-750 Grand Magic
- Lancair Barracuda
- Lancair ES
- MSW Votec 221
- Pipistrel Panthera
- Van's Aircraft RV-7
- Van's Aircraft RV-8
- Van's Aircraft RV-14
- Van's Aircraft RV-15
- Whisper X350 Generation II

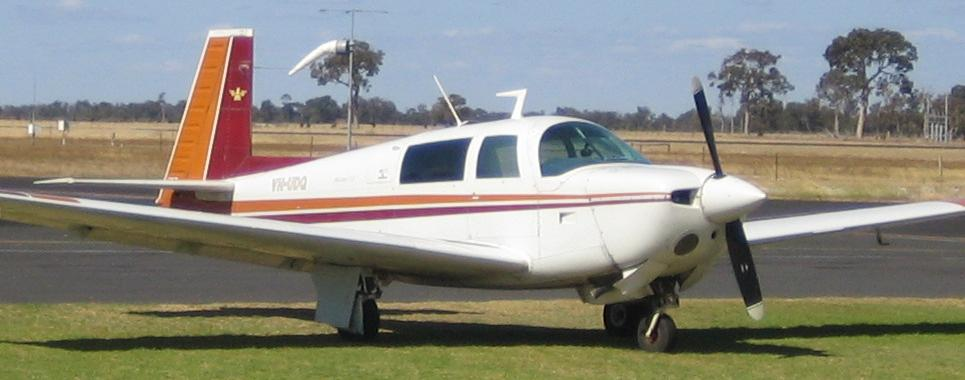
The Mooney M20J can have an IO-390-A3A6 installed under an STC

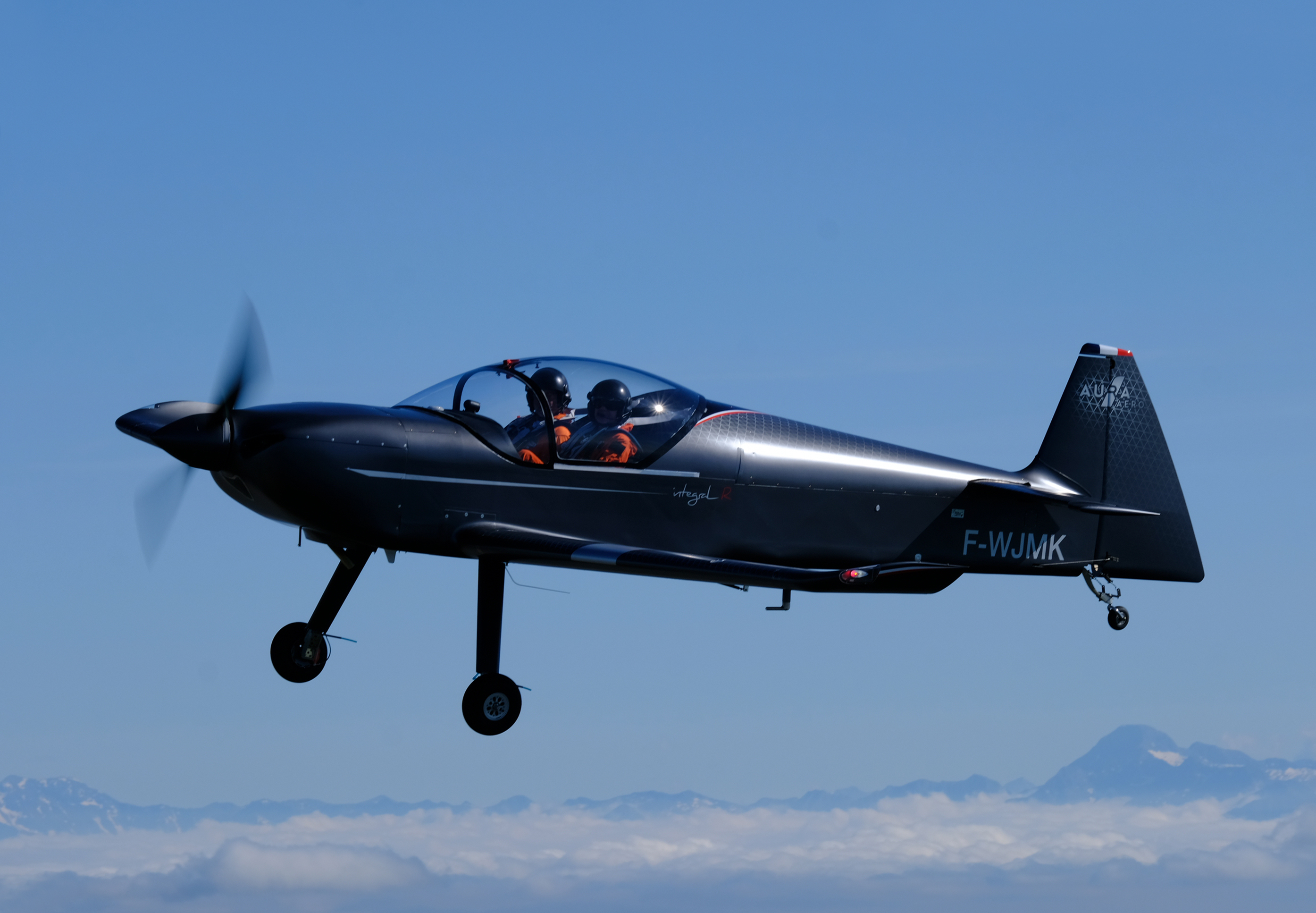
Aura Aero Integral R

Certified aircraft

- Aura Aero Integral R - aerobatic 210 hp (157 kW) - certified in 2024
- Cessna 177RG - available in July 2009 under an STC
- Cirrus SR20 - factory installed IO-390-C3B6 215 hp (160 kW) version on the SR20 G6 version
- Mooney M20 E, F & J - available in November 2009 under an STC
- Piper PA-28R Arrow - proposed under STC
- Symphony SA-160 - proposed as a factory installed 200 hp (149 kW) version, but aircraft no longer in production
- Tecnam P2010

Military Aircraft

- Lancair Synergy T-90 Colombian Air Force

== Specifications (IO-390-A1A6) ==
Data from Lycoming Specialty Datasheet & Type Certificate Data Sheet

=== General characteristics ===
- Type: 4-cylinder fuel-injected horizontally opposed aircraft engine
- Bore: 5.319 in (135.1 mm)
- Stroke: 4.375 in (111.1 mm)
- Displacement: 389 cu in (6.37 L)
- Length: 30.70 in (780 mm)
- Width: 34.25 in (870 mm)
- Height: 19.35 in (491 mm)
- Dry weight: 308 lb (139.71 kg) dry

=== Components ===
- Fuel system: fuel-injection
- Fuel type: 100LL avgas
- Cooling system: air-cooled

=== Performance ===
- Power output: 210 hp (160 kW) at 2700 rpm
- Compression ratio: 8.9:1
- Fuel consumption: 11.1 gallons per hour (42 liters per hour; 9.2 imperial gallons per hour) at 65 percent power
- Power-to-weight ratio: 0.68 hp/lb (1.12 kW/kg)

== See also ==
- Lycoming O-360
- List of aircraft engines
