= Lancair =

American manufacturer of aviation aircraft kits

Lancair International
- Type: Privately held company
- Industry: Aerospace
- Founded: 1981
- Founder: Lance Neibauer
- Headquarters: Uvalde, Texas
- Key people: CEO: Mark Huffstutler (since 2017)
- Products: Kit aircraft
- Website: www.lancair.com

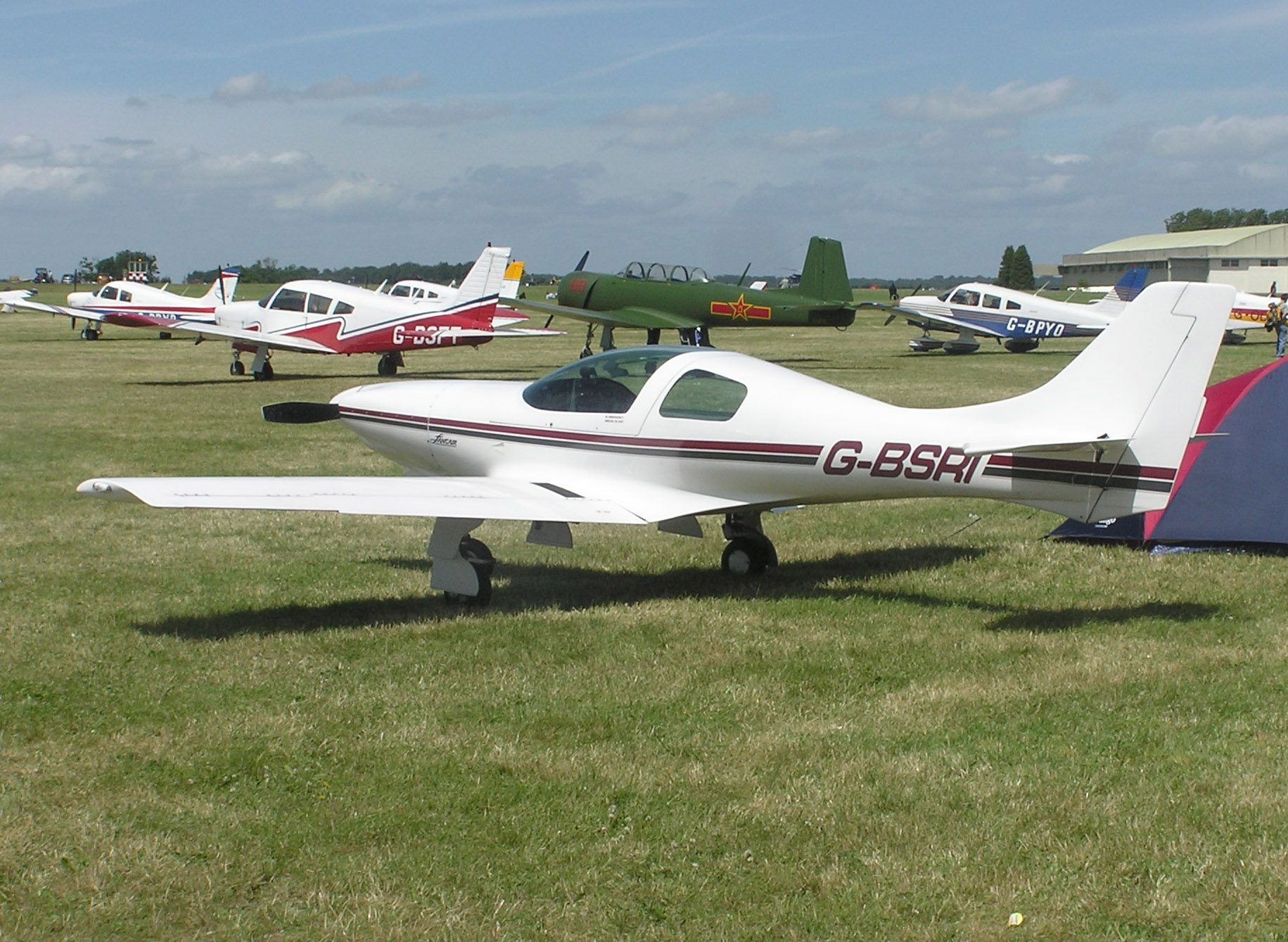
Lancair 235

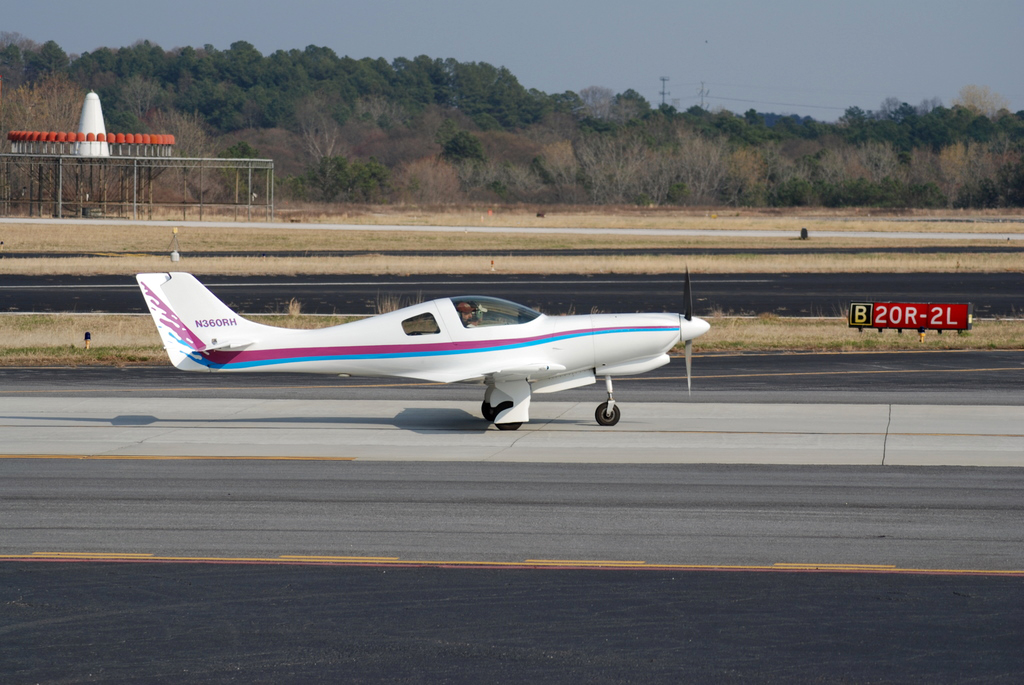
Lancair 360

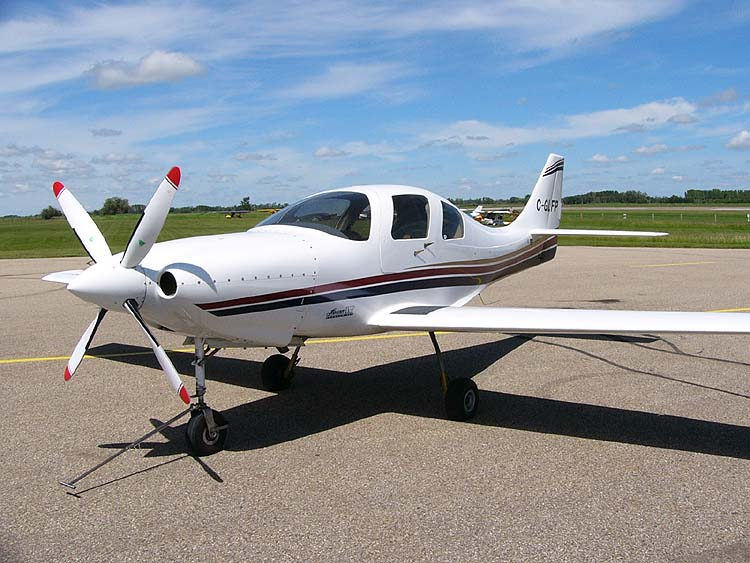
Lancair IV-P

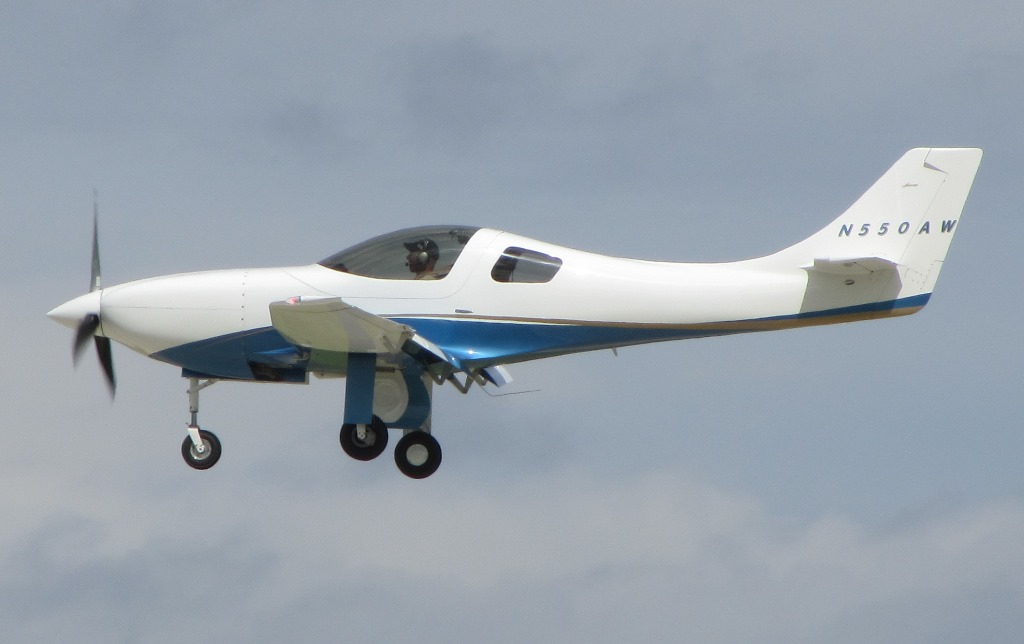
Lancair Legacy

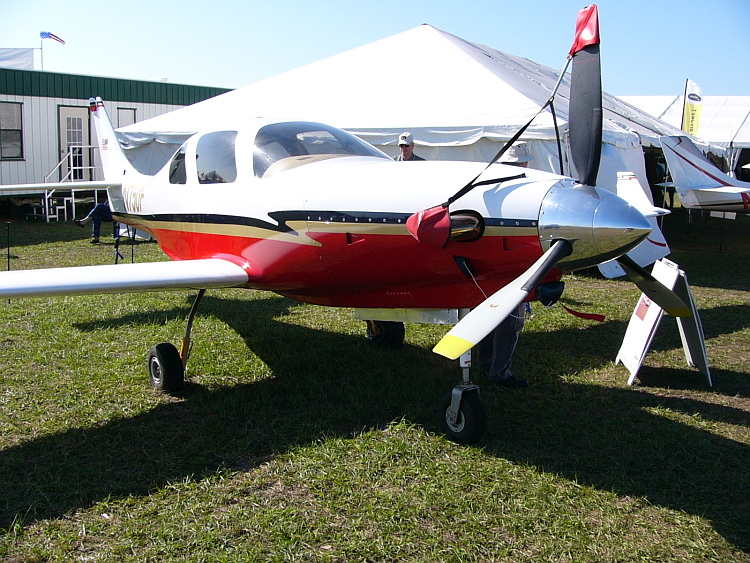
Lancair Propjet

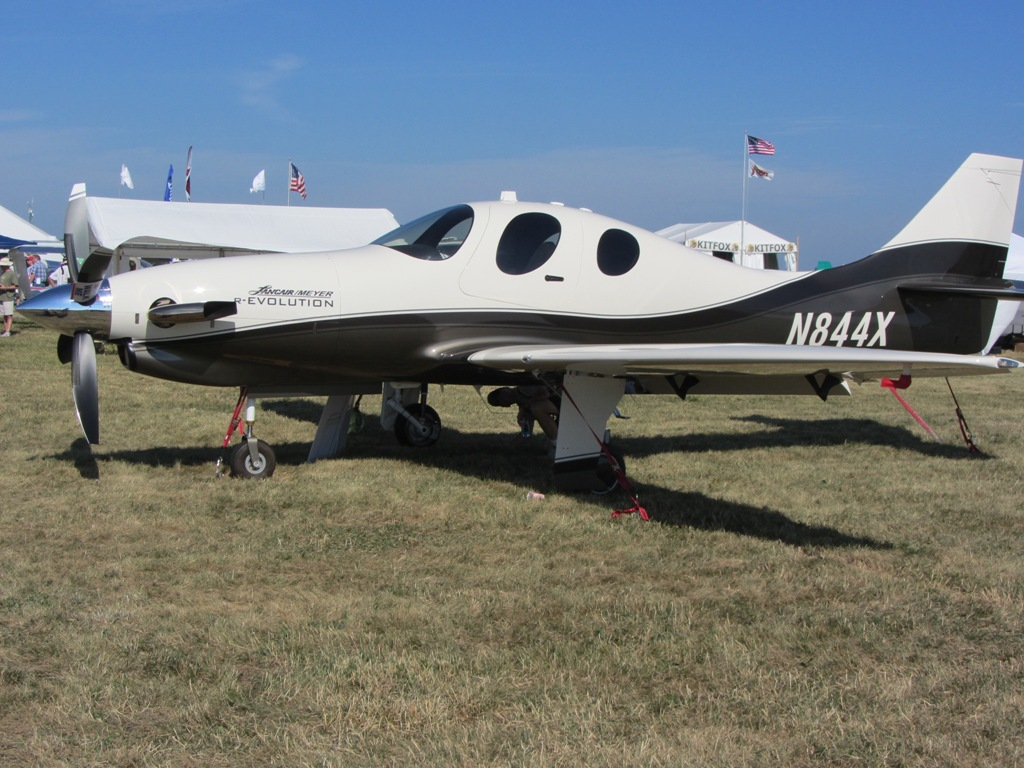
Lancair Evolution

Lancair International, Inc. (pronounced "lance-air") is a U.S. manufacturer of general aviation aircraft kits. They are well known for their series of high-performance single-engine aircraft that offer cruise speeds that surpass many twin-engine turboprop designs. Along with the Glasair series, the early Lancair designs were among the first kitplanes to bring modern molded composites construction to light aircraft.

In early 2017 the company, including all the older aircraft designs, was sold and moved from Redmond, Oregon to Uvalde, Texas under the name Lancair International, LLC. The newest model, the Lancair Evolution, was retained by the existing company, Lancair International, Inc, which changed its name to the Evolution Aircraft Company.

== History ==
=== Introduction ===
The company was founded by Lance Neibauer in 1981 as a producer of composite homebuilt aircraft kits. Neibauer had been introduced to aviation by his uncle Ray Betzoldt, who had collaborated with Al Meyers to build the Meyers 200. Whenever he visited his aunt and uncle, he always took a ride in the Meyers. Hooked, he built a Rand KR-2, a wooden and composite retractable taildragger, and later helped the Rand-Robinson company refine the plans for easier building by customers.

Neibauer began working an all-new design after asking every builder he could find what features they were seeking in a homebuilt design. Looking to improve performance with the latest possible features, he selected the new NASA NLF 0215-F airfoil designed by Dan Somers at Langley. The NLF, short for "Natural Laminar Flow", is a series of designs that replaced the older GAW series with more forgiving laminar flow characteristics. By 1983 the aircraft's basic parameters were fixed, and Neibauer rented a shop in Santa Paula, California and started work on the design.

Intending to introduce aircraft at Oshkosh in 1984, a minor fuel leak in the wing tanks forced them to miss the show so they could fix the problem. A modified version of the prototype, with re-shaped cowling and some changes to the wing profile, emerged as the Lancer 200 in December 1984. Equipped with a 100 hp Continental O-200 engine, the Lancer easily outflew anything powered by the same engine and generated intense interest at Oshkosh '85. However, a naming conflict forced the design to be re-christened, finally going on sale in 1985 as the Lancair 200.

The 200 was quickly replaced by the Lancair 235, equipped with the slightly more powerful Lycoming O-235. Re-engined versions quickly followed; the Lancair 320 with the 150 hp Lycoming O-320, and the Lancair 360 with the 180 hp Lycoming O-360. A new tail was introduced for the later models in order to address stability problems at low speeds with the larger engines.

The Lancair designs provided the highest performance in the single-engine GA class, and as the kit-build market was dominated by pilots looking to outperform existing "off-the-shelf" designs, the Lancair's kits sold well. By the end of 1990 they had sold over 600 kits for the various two-seat models, giving them what Neibauer claimed was 30% of the kit-built market.

A Lancair 320 appeared in a 1995 exhibit at the New York Museum of Modern Art.

=== New models ===
Starting in 1990, Neibauer turned his attention to a four-seat design that would retain the qualities of the earlier two-seaters. These efforts culminated in the Lancair IV, a four-seat optionally pressurized (IV-P) single-engine aircraft with a high cruise speed. The IV broke the speed record for planes in its class in February 1991 when it averaged 360.3 mph between San Francisco and Denver.

Already stretching the limits of their existing facilities, the company started looking for a new factory and after examining 200 potential sites they moved to Roberts Field in Redmond, Oregon in 1992. The company became Lancair International with the move. As of August 1998, according to Flight International, Lancair had sold 1,400 kits, 300 of them the Lancair IV model. Soon after the IV was introduced, Neibauer started work on a simpler fixed-gear version that emerged as the Lancair ES.

=== Columbia Aircraft ===
Lancair's designs were prominent in the homebuilt market, and in 1994 NASA and others encouraged Neibauer to develop a type certified aircraft. On 3 April 1993 he spun off a new company, Pacific Aviation Composites USA, in nearby Bend, Oregon. The new Lancair LC-40 was based on the fixed-gear Lancair ES. The first prototype flew in July 1996, followed by the certification prototype in early 1997. After a lengthy certification process, the design emerged as the Columbia 300 in 1998, followed by the turbocharged Columbia 400 in 2000. The Lancair Company was formed as a separate entity on 7 April 2000, and Pacific Aviation Composites was merged into The Lancair Company on 4 May 2000.

Deciding to focus on the Columbia models, in March 2003 Neibauer sold the kit side of the company to Joseph Bartels, a Louisiana attorney and Lancair IV-P builder and owner. Bartels had already formed Aero Cool to sell air conditioners for the various Lancair models. On 15 July 2005 Neibauer's portion of the company became Columbia Aircraft. The Columbias competed relatively unsuccessfully with the new and first-to-market Cirrus SR22. In 2010, major stockholders, the Wolstenholme family of Colmar, Pennsylvania, purchased the company and appointed Bob Wolstenholme as CEO. Following its entry into bankruptcy in 2007, Columbia Aircraft was sold to Cessna in November 2007. Cessna introduced their models as the Cessna 350 and Cessna 400.

=== Selling off older designs ===
In July 2016 Lancair announced it would be selling the older Lancair lines of aircraft to concentrate on the Lancair Evolution instead. In February 2017 the 200, 360, IV, IVP, IVPT, ES, ESP, and Legacy designs were sold to Mark and Conrad Huffstutler, who now operate the company as Lancair International, LLC, in Uvalde, Texas. They purchased all the assets, intellectual property and will provide parts and other support for all the older Lancair models. They plan to resume production of some of the older models and will develop new models as well. With the sale announced Lancair changed its name to Evolution Aircraft.

== Aircraft ==
Summary of aircraft built by Lancair:

- Lancair 200 (originally "Lancer 200") 2-seat kit powered by a Continental O-200 engine, flown in 1984 and released in 1985
- Lancair 235 2-seat kit powered by a Lycoming O-235 engine, released in 1986
- Lancair 320 2-seat kit powered by a Lycoming O-320 engine, released in 1988
- Lancair 360 2-seat kit powered by a Lycoming O-360 engine, released in 1988
- Lancair ES 4-seat kit powered by a Continental IO-550
- Lancair IV
- Lancair IV-P
- Lancair Legacy
- Lancair Tigress
- Lancair Propjet
- Lancair Sentry
- Lancair Evolution
- Lancair Mako first flown on 18 July 2017
- Lancair Barracuda first flown 2018
