= Aviation Composite Technology =

Aviation Composite Technology (ACT) is an aircraft manufacturer formed in the Philippines in 1990. It was established to produce the Apache 1 for the Philippines military and police service.
