= Lancair Barracuda =

Homebuilt kit aircraft

Barracuda

General information
- Type: Amateur-built aircraft
- National origin: United States
- Manufacturer: Lancair
- Status: In production (2019)

History
- Introduction date: July 2018
- First flight: 2018
- Developed from: Lancair Legacy

The Lancair Barracuda is an American amateur-built aircraft produced by Lancair of Uvalde, Texas. It was introduced at AirVenture in July 2018. The aircraft is supplied as a kit for amateur construction.

The design is a development of the Lancair Legacy, employing a one-piece wing with greater span.

== Design and development ==
The Barracuda was designed to provide more speed, with simplified kit construction over earlier models.

The aircraft features a cantilever low-wing, a two-seats-in-side-by-side configuration enclosed cockpit under a bubble canopy, partially or optionally fully retractable tricycle landing gear and a single engine in tractor configuration.

The aircraft is made from composite material, including e-glass, carbon fiber with a Nomex honeycomb core. Its 28 ft (8.5 m) span wing has a double taper planform and mounts Fowler flaps. The standard engine used is the 210 hp (157 kW) Lycoming IO-390, with the 310 hp (231 kW) Continental IO-550-N powerplant optional. The cockpit is 43.5 in (110 cm) wide and 44.5 in (113 cm) high and the roll rate is 150 degrees per second.

The kit includes the airframe, engine, propeller and the avionics, usually the Garmin G3X Touch glass cockpit flight display and GTN-750 GPS, airband VHF radio, multifunction display.

The kit purchase price includes Lancair's basic two-week Builder Assistance program.

== Operational history ==
The first customer-completed Barracuda was displayed at Sun 'n Fun, in April 2019.

== Specifications (Barracuda) ==
Data from AvWeb and manufacturer

General characteristics

- Crew: one
- Capacity: one passenger
- Length: 22 ft (6.7 m)
- Wingspan: 28 ft (8.5 m)
- Gross weight: 2,200 lb (998 kg)
- Fuel capacity: 65 U.S. gallons (250 L; 54 imp gal) usable
- Powerplant: 1 × Continental IO-550N six cylinder, air-cooled, four stroke aircraft engine, 310 hp (231 kW)
- Propellers: 3-bladed "Raptor" constant speed propeller

Performance

- Maximum speed: 235 kn (270 mph, 435 km/h) max cruise, 12,000 ft
- Cruise speed: 223 kn (257 mph, 413 km/h)
- Stall speed: 52 kn (60 mph, 96 km/h) landing configuration
- Range: 1,000 nmi (1,151 mi, 1,852 km)
- g limits: +4.4/-2.2 g
- Rate of climb: 2,700 ft/min (14 m/s) when solo
