= MSW Votec 221 =

Swiss kitbuilt light-sport aircraft

Votec 221
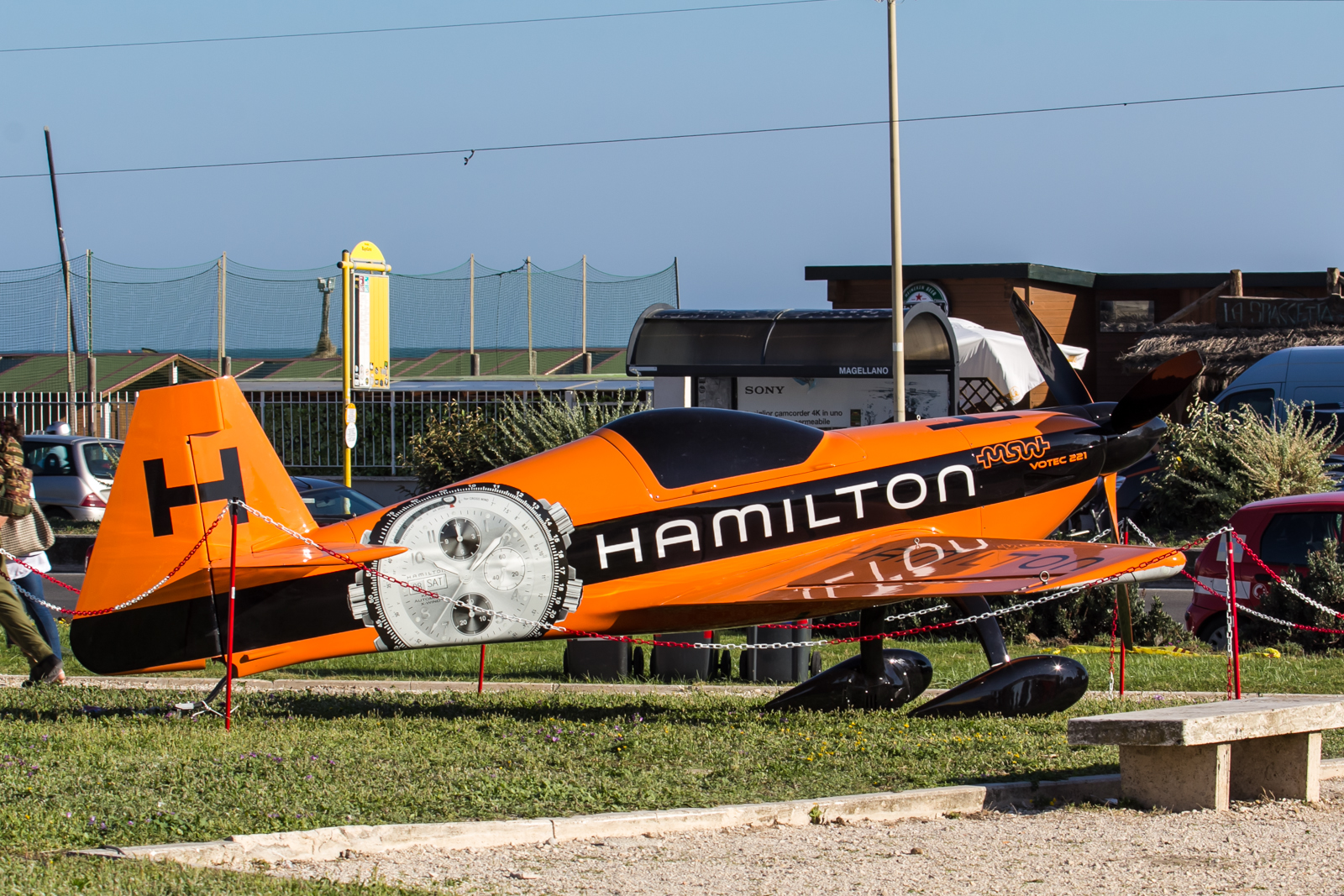

General information
- Type: Single seat homebuilt light-sport aircraft
- National origin: Switzerland
- Manufacturer: MSW Aviation

The MSW Votec 221 is a single engine, single seat kitbuilt light-sport aircraft, designed and built in Switzerland.

== Design and development ==
The Votec 221 is a single seat, low wing monoplane, designed for engines in the power range 90-180 kW (120-240 hp). The first prototype, completed in 2009, has a 157 kW (210 hp) Lycoming AEIO-390 flat-four engine and the second, finished the following year, a 134 kW (180 hp) engine. MSW's numerical designation has two digits indicating power in hp/10, followed by the number of seats, suggesting an optimum 220 hp power unit.

Externally, the Votec 221 resembles a scaled down (span, 80%) MSW Votec 351. It has low aspect ratio straight tapered wings with blunt, almost square tips. Ailerons are assisted by external spades. The empennage is also straight tapered, with a forward set tailplane mounted on top of the fuselage, far enough forward on the fin to require only a small cut-out for movement of the deep rudder. Both elevators have trim tabs and the rudder is horn balanced. The cockpit, placed over the wing, is covered with a single piece, starboard hinged canopy. Like the Votec 351, the 321 has a conventional undercarriage. The mainwheels are mounted on curved, sprung cantilever legs and enclosed by long fairings. It has a steerable tailwheel on a long cantilever.

== Operational history ==
The first prototype is Swiss-registered and the second German, the latter appearing at Aero 2011, held at Friedrichshafen that April. First flight dates were not released by late 2011 but the first prototype was certainly flying by late May 2012. A full scale non-flying mock up has also been exhibited.

== Variants ==
MSW One
Version for the US one design class with a 220 hp (164 kW) Lycoming IO-360 engine.

== Specifications ==
Data from Jane's All the World's Aircraft 2012-13

General characteristics

- Capacity: One
- Length: 5.66 m (18 ft 7 in)
- Wingspan: 5.85 m (19 ft 2 in)
- Wing area: 7.10 m^{2} (76.4 sq ft)
- Empty weight: 420 kg (926 lb)
- Max takeoff weight: 600 kg (1,323 lb)
- Powerplant: 1 × Lycoming AEIO-390 flat-four engine, 160 kW (210 hp)
- Propellers: 3-bladed MT-Propeller MTV-12-B-C.C183-17e, 2.03 m (6 ft 8 in) diameter (diameter from)

Performance

- Range: 1,398 km (869 mi, 755 nmi)
- g limits: 10/-10
- Wing loading: 84.54 kg/m^{2} (17.32 lb/sq ft) maximum
