= Lancair Sentry =

American light kit airplane

Sentry

General information
- Type: Amateur-built aircraft
- National origin: United States
- Manufacturer: Lancair
- Status: Production completed (2002)
- Number built: 2

History
- Manufactured: 2002
- First flight: September 2001
- Developed from: Lancair IV

The Lancair Sentry is an American amateur-built aircraft that was designed and produced by Lancair of Redmond, Oregon, introduced in 2002. The aircraft was supplied as a kit for amateur construction, although it was also intended as a production military trainer aircraft. First flown in September 2001, only two were ever completed.

The design was intended to compete with other similar two-seat civil designs, such as the Thunder Mustang and the Turbine Legend. Military sales prospects included the Mexican Navy, but no orders were forthcoming.

== Design and development ==
The Sentry is a two-seat development of the four-seat Lancair IV, with the door-accessed cabin replaced by a canopy. It also has an enlarged vertical tail fin.

The aircraft features a cantilever low-wing, a two-seats-in-tandem enclosed cockpit under a rear-hinged bubble canopy, retractable tricycle landing gear and a single engine in tractor configuration.

The aircraft is made from composite materials, predominantly carbon fiber reinforced polymer. Its 30.2 ft (9.2 m) span wing employs a McWilliams RXM5-217 root airfoil, tapering to a NACA 64-212 tip airfoil. The wing has an area of 98 sq ft (9.1 m^{2}) and mounts flaps. The standard engine used is the 708 hp (528 kW) Walter M601D turboprop powerplant powering an American 82 in (208.3 cm) three-bladed Hartzell Propeller or a Czech 84 in (213.4 cm) Avia Propeller.

== Specifications (Sentry) ==
Data from Pilot Friend, Skybrary

General characteristics

- Crew: one
- Capacity: one passenger
- Length: 26 ft (7.9 m)
- Wingspan: 30.2 ft (9.2 m)
- Height: 7 ft 10 in (2.40 m)
- Wing area: 98 sq ft (9.1 m^{2})
- Empty weight: 2,200 lb (998 kg)
- Gross weight: 3,550 lb (1,610 kg)
- Fuel capacity: 125 U.S. gallons (470 L; 104 imp gal)
- Powerplant: 1 × Walter M601D turboprop aircraft engine, 708 hp (528 kW)
- Propellers: 3-bladed Hartzell Propeller constant speed propeller

Performance

- Cruise speed: 380 mph (610 km/h, 330 kn)
- Stall speed: 74 mph (119 km/h, 64 kn) power off
- Range: 1,150 mi (1,850 km, 1,000 nmi)
- Rate of climb: 4,000 ft/min (20 m/s)
