= Lancair 360 =

Two-seat monoplane aircraft

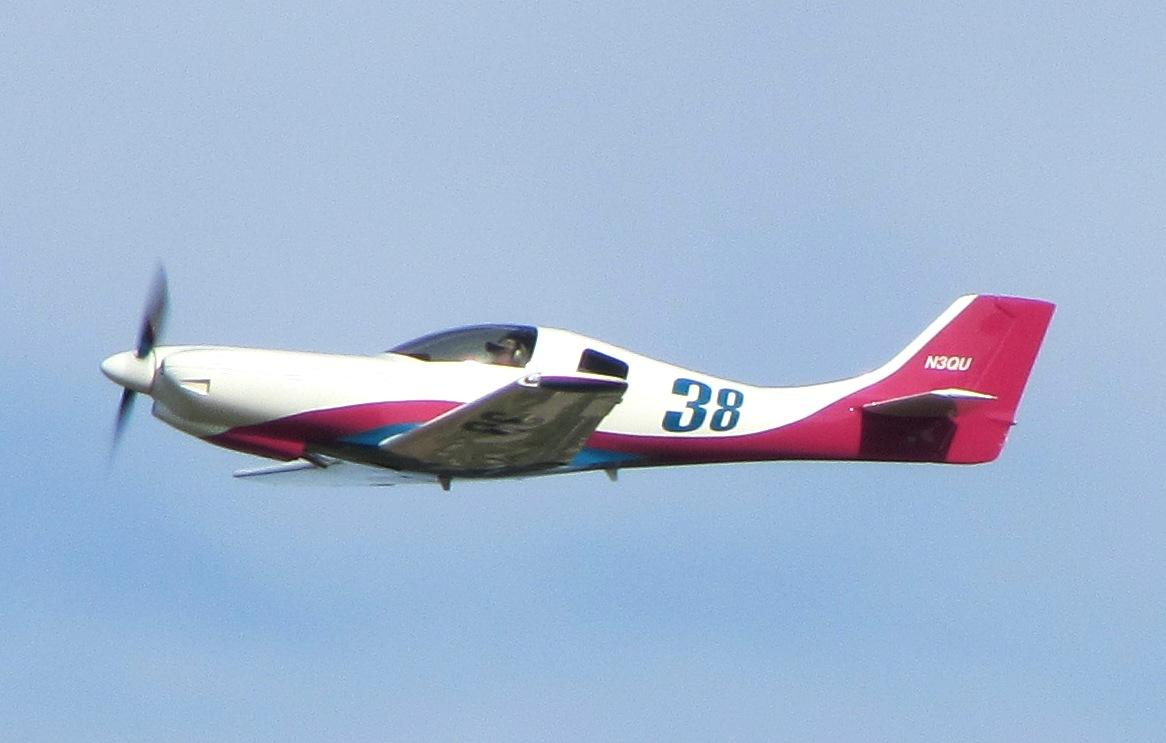

General information
- Type: Kit Plane
- Manufacturer: Lancair
- Designer: Lance A. Neibauer
- Status: Operational
- Primary user: Civilian

History
- Developed from: Lancair 320

The Lancair 360 is a two-seat aircraft marketed in kit form. It is a low-wing monoplane of conventional configuration with retractable tricycle undercarriage. The Lancair Legacy was chosen to replace the Lancair 360 in 1999.

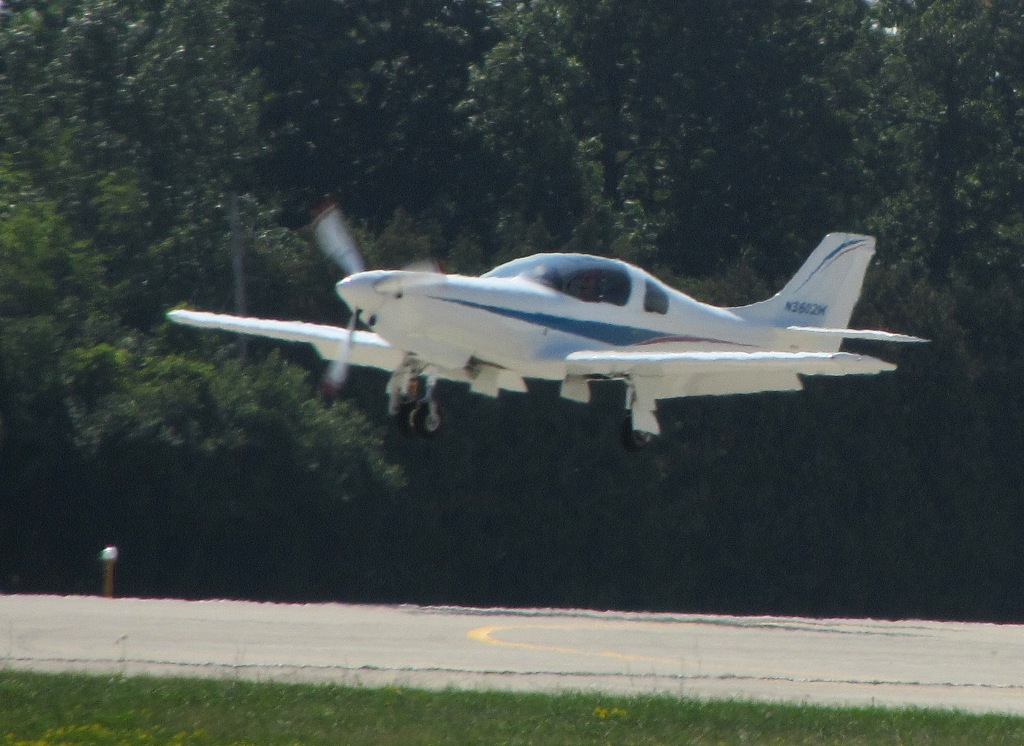
Lancair 360 MKII

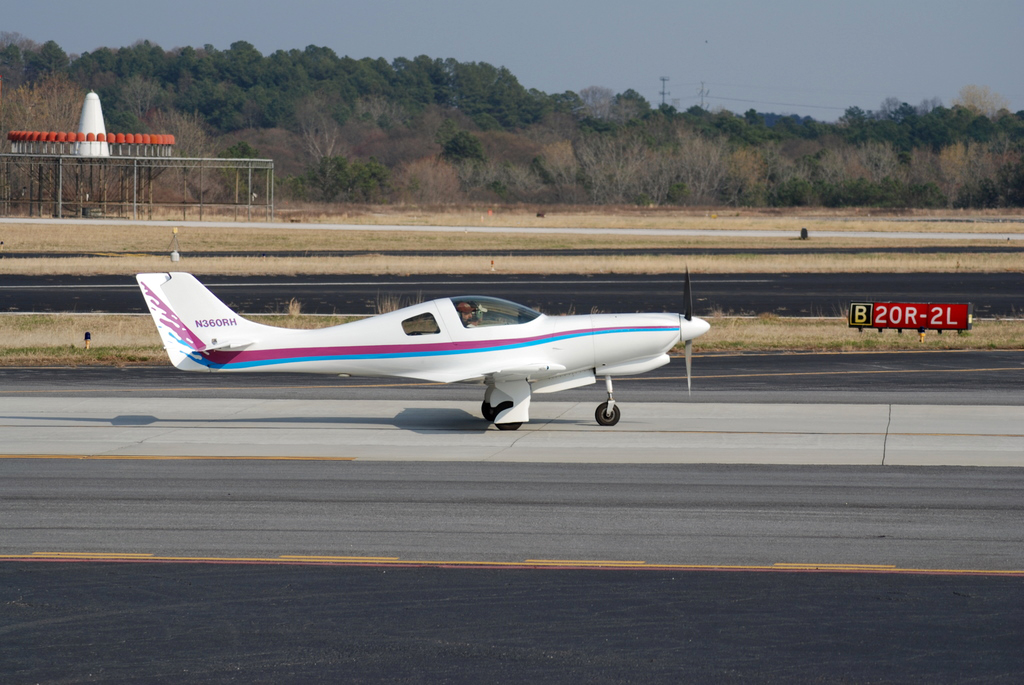
A Lancair 360 at Peachtree-Dekalb Regional Airport.

== Variants ==
- Lancair 360TC - Carbon Fiber Turbocharged

== Specifications (Lancair 360) ==
Data from Lancair

General characteristics

- Crew: 1
- Capacity: 2
- Length: 21 ft (6.4 m)
- Wingspan: 23 ft 6 in (7.162 m)
- Wing area: 76 sq ft (7.1 m^{2})
- Aspect ratio: 7.266
- Airfoil: NASA NLF(1)-0215F
- Empty weight: 1,090 lb (495 kg) Varies, based on Engine and Options
- Gross weight: 1,685 lb (765 kg)
- Fuel capacity: 40-44 gal
- Powerplant: 1 × IO-320/IO360 Lycoming, 160–180 hp (120–130 kW)
- Propellers: 2 or 3-bladed

Performance

- Maximum speed: 222–226 kn (255–260 mph, 410–418 km/h)
- Cruise speed: 205 kn (235 mph, 378 km/h)
- Stall speed: 59 kn (68 mph, 109 km/h) Landing Configuration
- Range: 510–640 nmi (580–730 mi, 940–1,180 km) (75%, std/opt fuel)
- g limits: +9.0 -4.5
- Wing loading: 22.17 lb/sq ft (108.2 kg/m^{2})
- Power/mass: 0.107
