= Lancair 320 =

American homebuilt light aircraft

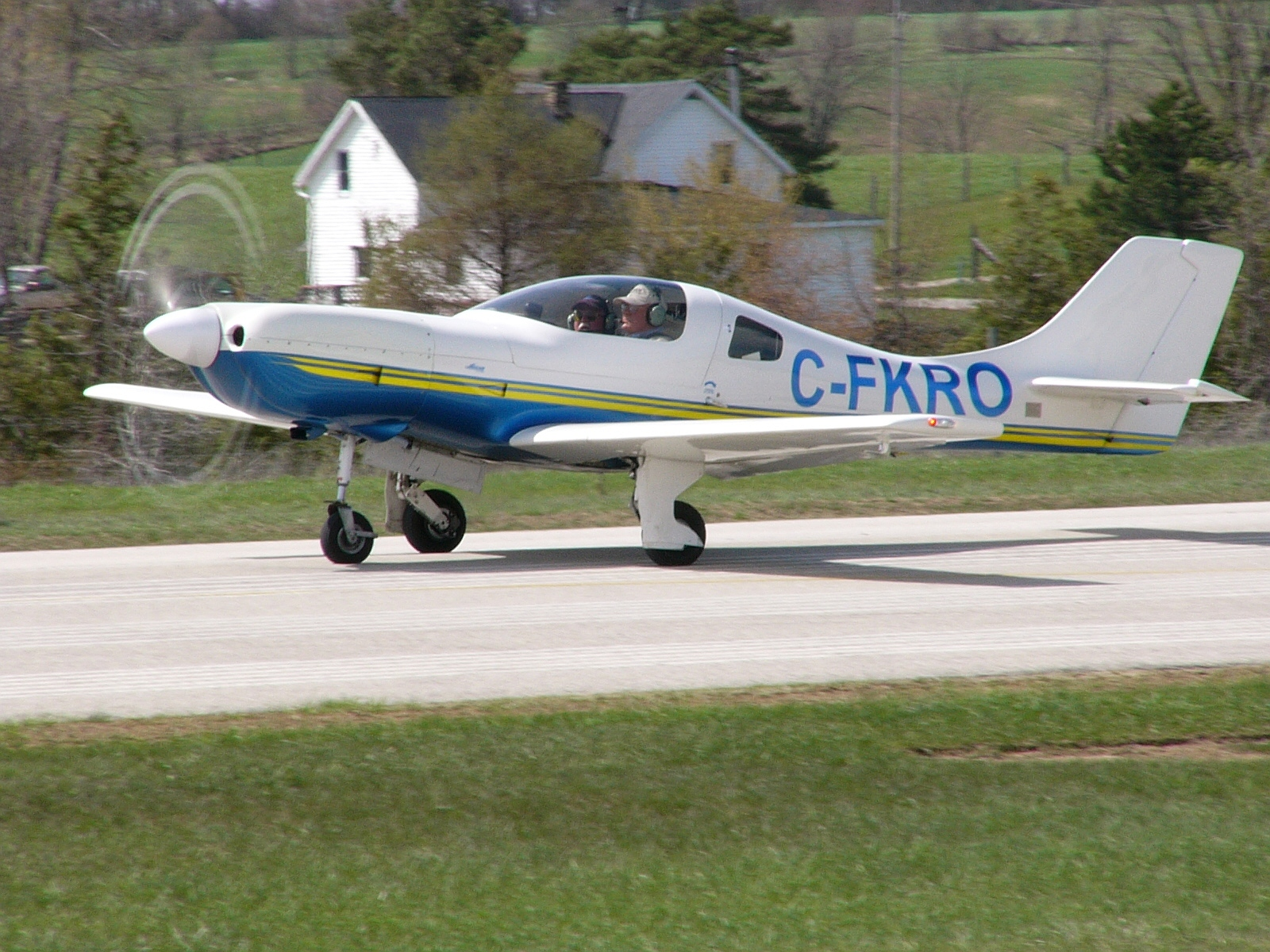
- Lancair 320

General information
- Type: Homebuilt aircraft
- Manufacturer: Lancair
- Designer: Lance A. Neibauer

History
- Introduction date: 1988

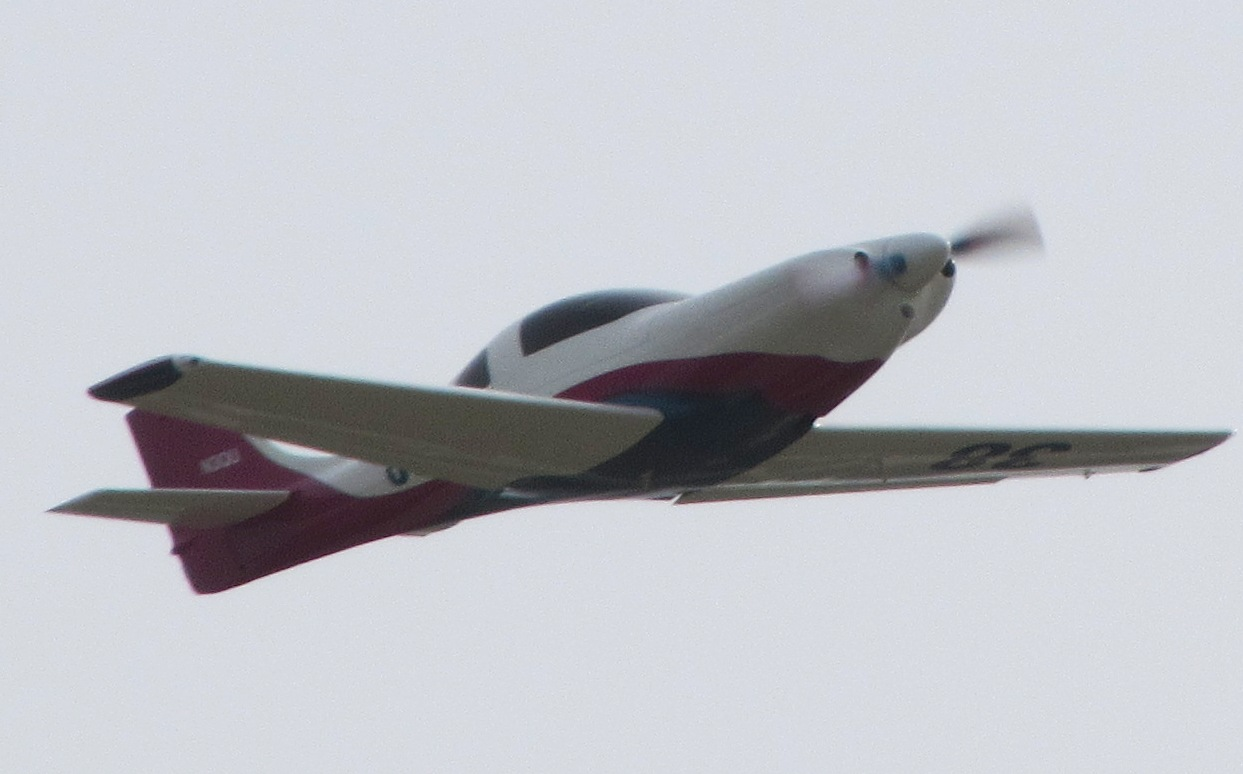
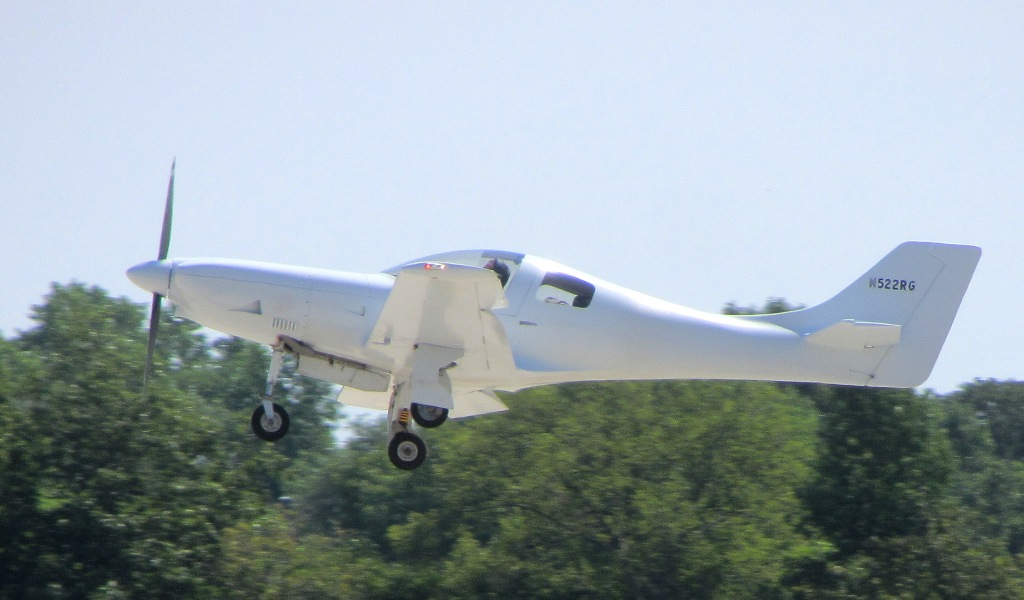
A Lancair 320 departing (left) and on approach

The Lancair 320 is a two-seat single-engined light aircraft marketed in kit form by the U.S. general aviation manufacturer Lancair. It is based on the Lancair 235, but with a larger fuselage and more powerful engine, and like the 235, it is a low-winged monoplane of composite construction with a retractable tricycle undercarriage, with side-by-side seating in an enclosed cockpit. The Lancair 360 is similar, but with a more powerful engine.

In 1990 the ACT Apache 1, based on the Lancair 320 was proposed to be jointly built by Aerotech S.A. of Switzerland and Aviation Composite Technology Inc. in the Philippines for use by the Armed Forces of the Philippines and the Philippine National Police.

== Specifications ==
Data from Jane's All The World's Aircraft 1993-94, Lancair and manufacturer

General characteristics

- Crew: 2
- Length: 21 ft 0 in (6.40 m)
- Wingspan: 23 ft 6 in (7.16 m)
- Height: 7 ft 0 in (2.13 m)
- Wing area: 76.0 sq ft (7.06 m^{2})
- Empty weight: 1,040 lb (472 kg)
- Gross weight: 1,685 lb (764 kg)
- Max takeoff weight: 1,685 lb (764 kg)
- Fuel capacity: 43 gal (163 litres)
- Powerplant: 1 × Textron Lycoming O-320 air-cooled flat four, 160 hp (120 kW)

Performance

- Maximum speed: 260 mph (420 km/h, 230 kn) at sea level
- Cruise speed: 240 mph (390 km/h, 210 kn) at 7,500 ft (2,300 m)
- Stall speed: 63 mph (101 km/h, 55 kn)
- Range: 1,450 mi (2,330 km, 1,260 nmi) (no reserves)
- Service ceiling: 18,000 ft (5,500 m)
- Rate of climb: 1,650 ft/min (8.4 m/s)
