= Lancair Legacy =

American homebuilt aircraft

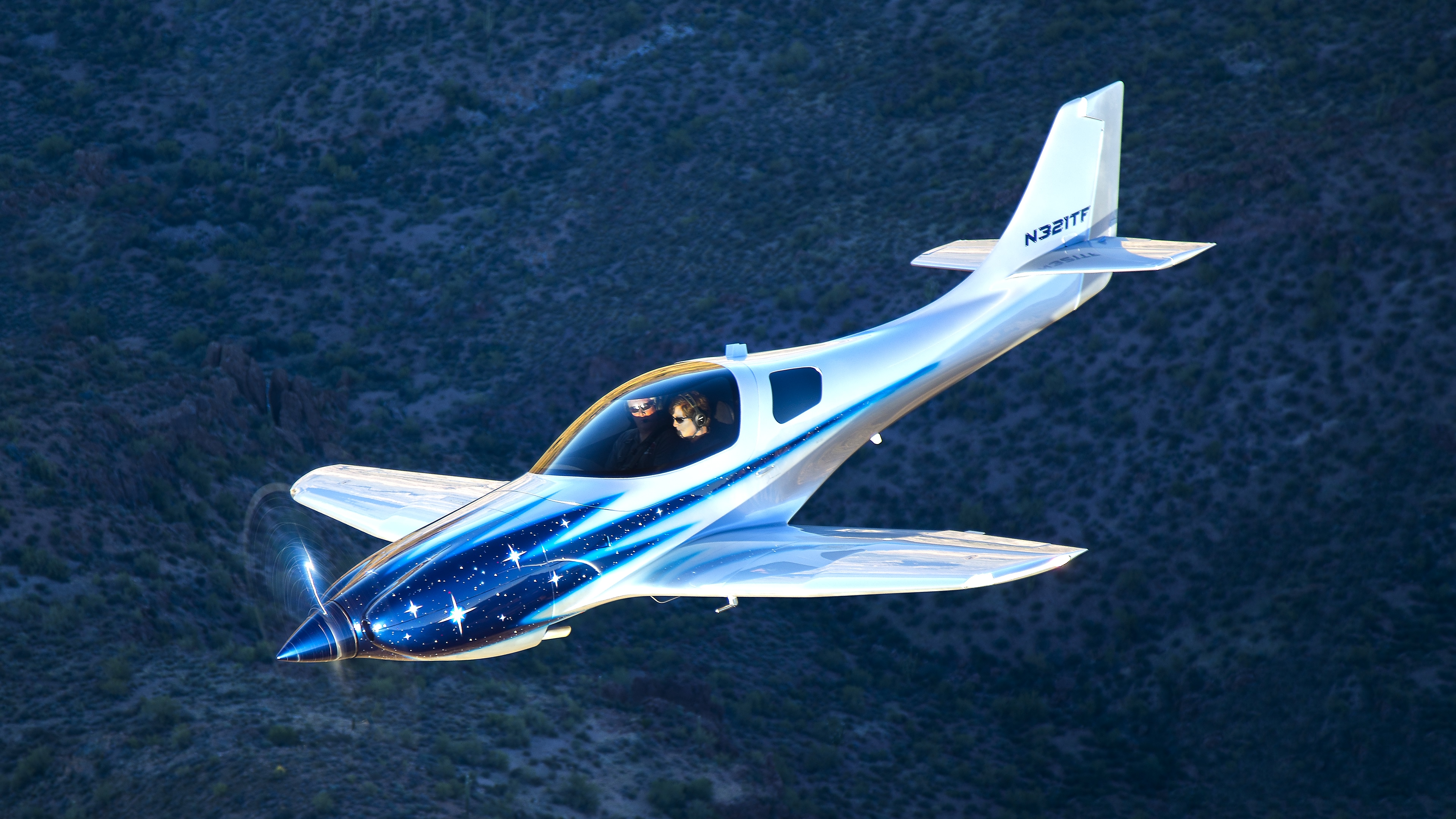
Lancair Legacy RG (Starhawk)

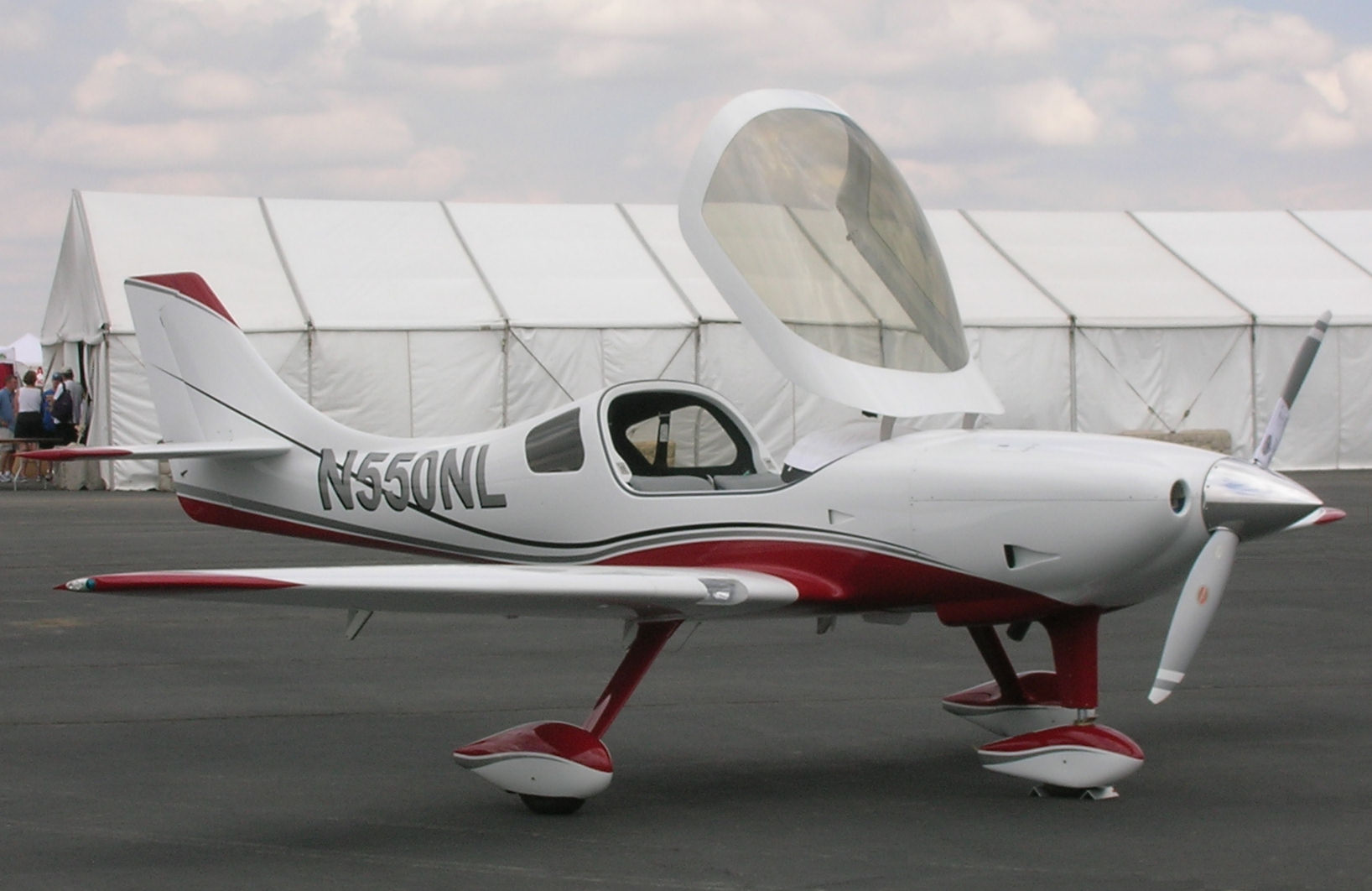
Lancair Legacy FG

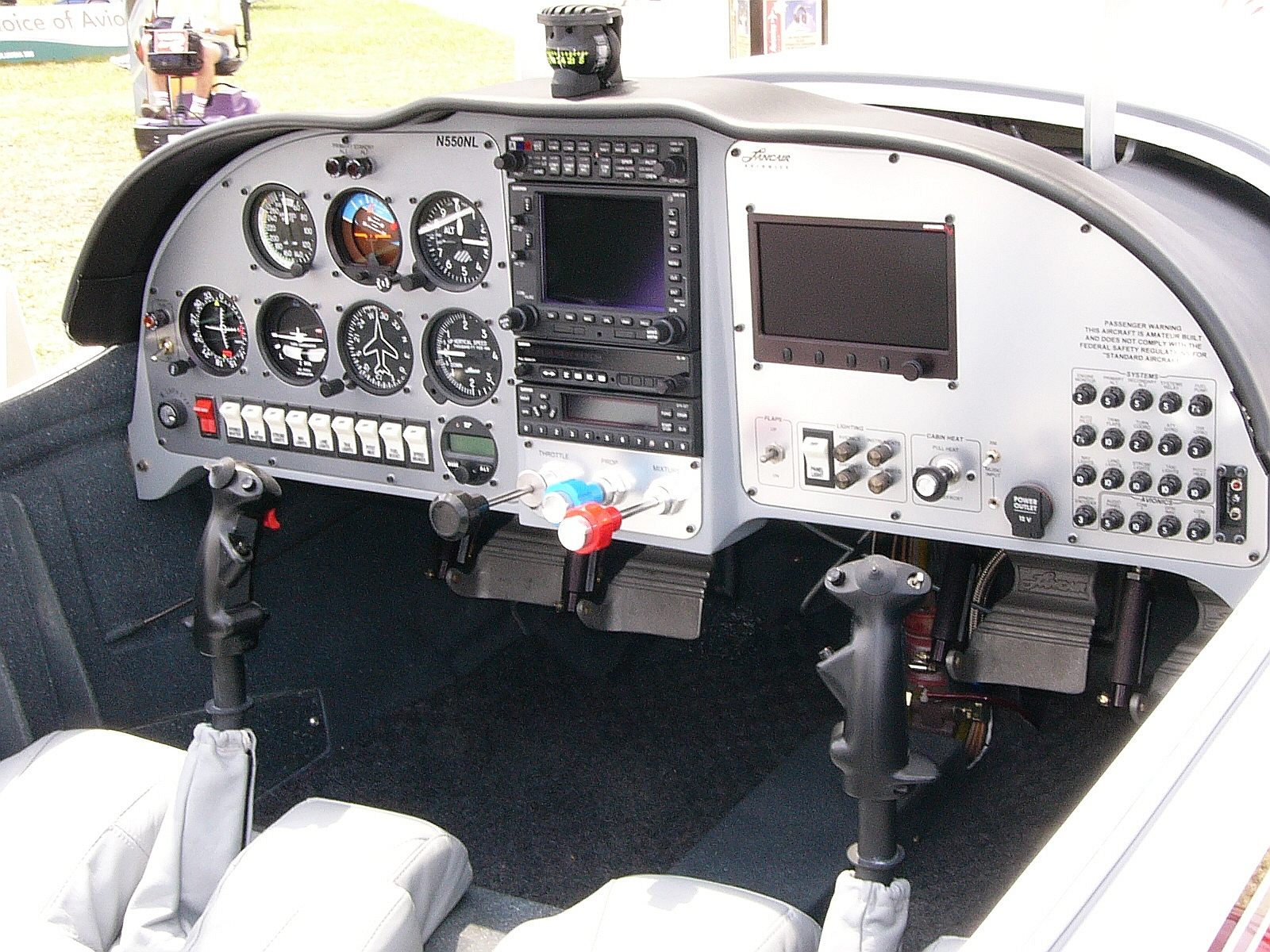
Legacy FG instrument panel

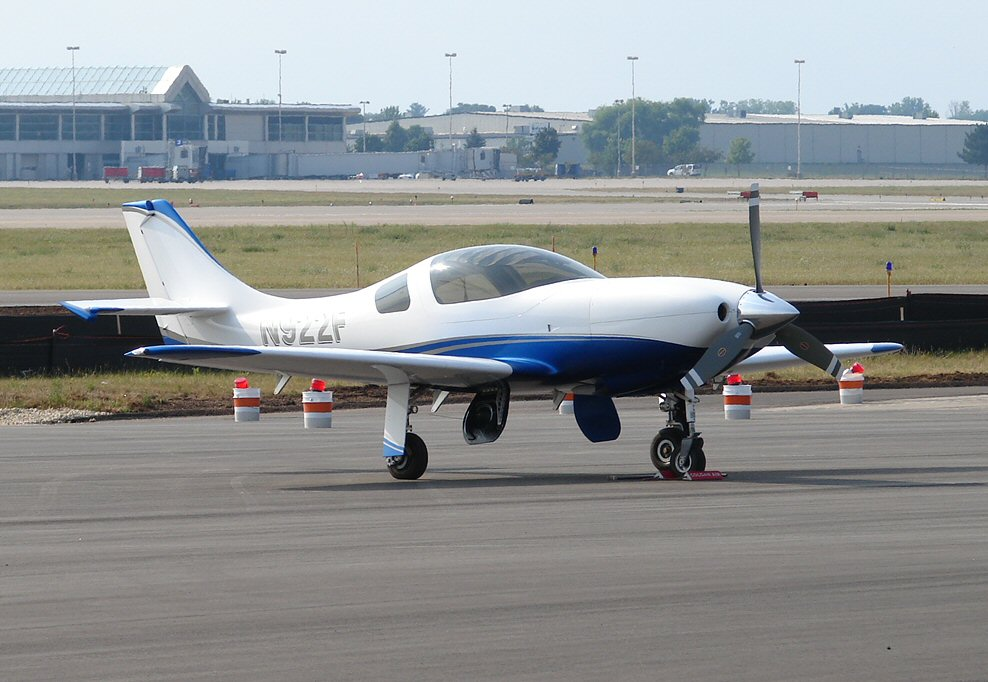
Lancair Legacy

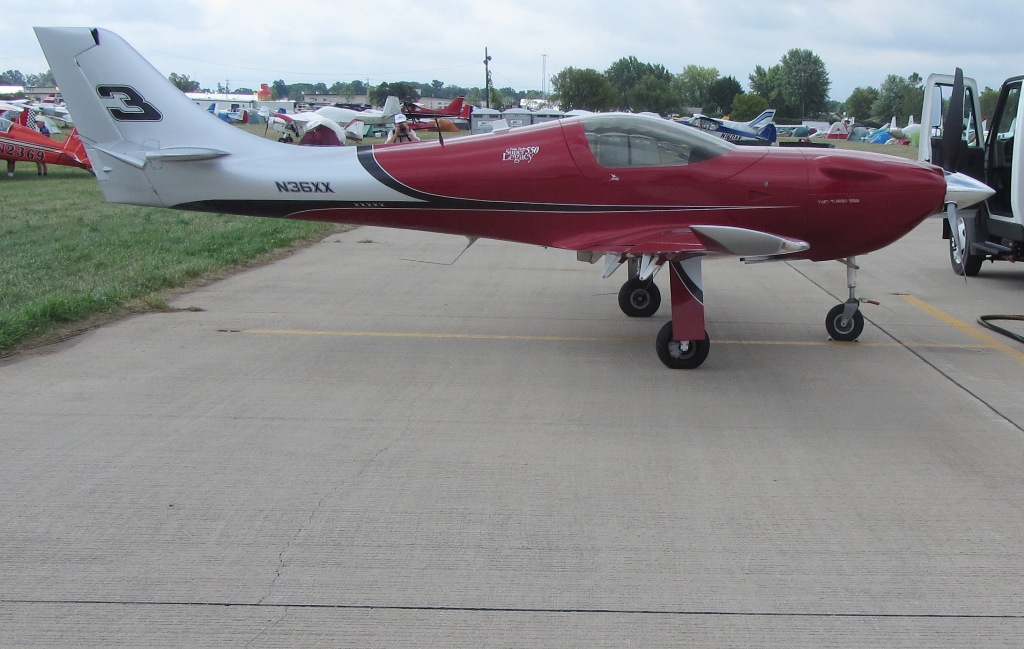
Lancair Super Legacy 550 Twin Turbo

The Lancair Legacy, a modernized version of the Lancair 320, is a low-wing two-place retractable-gear composite monoplane manufactured by the American company Lancair. It is available as a kit that cost US$71,500 in 2011. There is also a fixed-gear version, the Legacy FG. The retractable version of the Legacy cruises at 276 mph at 8,000 ft and the fixed gear version cruises at 215 mph.

== Design and development ==
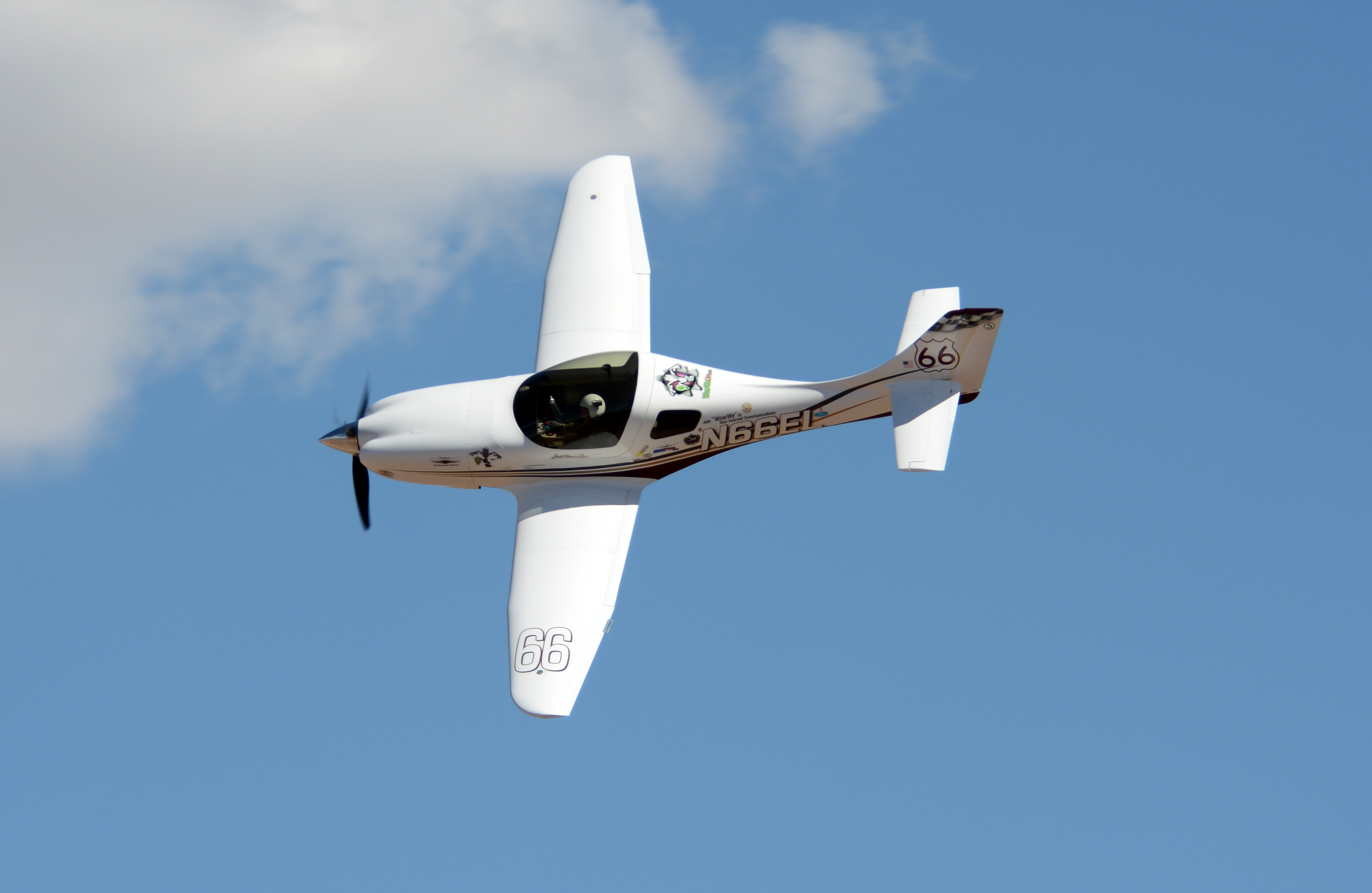
Race 66 Lancair Legacy

The Legacy features a cantilever low wing, a two-seats-in-side-by-side configuration enclosed cockpit under a bubble canopy, fixed or retractable tricycle landing gear and a single engine in tractor configuration.

The aircraft is made from vacuum-formed composite sandwiches. Its 7.8 m (25.6 ft) span wing employs a Cole CG10 airfoil at the wing root and a Cole GC11 airfoil at the wingtip. The wing has an area of 7.6 m^{2} (82 sq ft) and mounts flaps. The aircraft can accept engines of 200 to 310 hp (149 to 231 kW). The standard engine used is the 310 hp (231 kW) Continental IO-550 but engines as small as the 200 hp (149 kW) Lycoming IO-360 four-stroke powerplant can be fitted.

Four Lancair Legacy aircraft have won the Grand Champion Kit Built award at the EAA AirVenture airshow, in 2012, 2013, 2014, and 2016.

In May 2016, Lancair announced that the company was ending production of new Legacy aircraft kits due to the significant investments that would have been needed to continue manufacturing. The company sold the line in 2017 to Mark and Conrad Huffstutler, who now build the design as Lancair International, LLC, in Uvalde, Texas.

== Variants ==
Legacy RG 550
Retractable landing gear model
Legacy FG 390 and FG 550

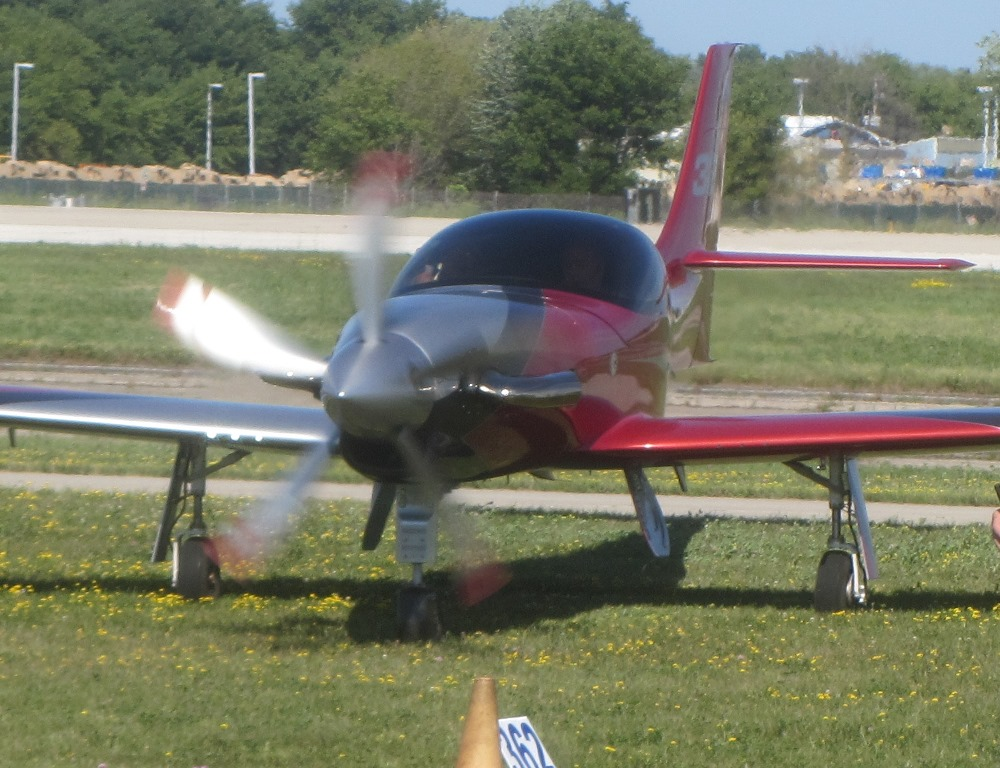
Turbine Lancair Legacy

Fixed landing gear model with Lycoming IO-390 or IO-550
Legacy Turboprop
One example built with the project name "Turbulence"
CIAC T-90 Calima
Licence-built by CIAC in Colombia for the Colombian Air Force

== Operators ==
In 2009 the Colombian Air Force ordered 25 modified Legacy FGs to be used as basic trainers. The aircraft feature 15% more wing area than the standard Legacy FG wing, leading-edge cuffs and a ventral fin to improve stability and low-speed handling along with a reshaped vertical tail and rudder. The aircraft are known as the Lancair Synergy and were delivered as kits for assembly in Colombia. The first Synergy was flown in September 2010.

== Specifications (Legacy RG) ==
Data from Lancair Legacy webpage

General characteristics

- Crew: one
- Capacity: one passenger
- Length: 22 ft 0 in (6.71 m)
- Wingspan: 25 ft 6 in (7.77 m)
- Wing area: 82.5 sq ft (7.66 m^{2})
- Aspect ratio: 7.95
- Empty weight: 1,500 lb (680 kg)
- Gross weight: 2,200 lb (998 kg)
- Fuel capacity: 65 US gallons (246 litres)
- Powerplant: 1 × Continental IO-550-N six cylinder, four-stroke aircraft engine, 310 hp (230 kW)
- Propellers: 3-bladed constant speed

Performance

- Maximum speed: 295 mph (475 km/h, 256 kn)
- Cruise speed: 276 mph (444 km/h, 240 kn) at 8000 feet
- Stall speed: 65 mph (105 km/h, 56 kn) flaps down
- Range: 1,150 mi (1,850 km, 1,000 nmi) at 8000 feet with reserves
- Service ceiling: 18,000 ft (5,500 m)
- g limits: +4.4/-2.2 utility category, +3.8/-2,0 normal category
- Rate of climb: 2,000 ft/min (10 m/s) at gross weight
- Wing loading: 23 lb/sq ft (110 kg/m^{2})
