= List of aircraft (X) =

This is a list of aircraft in alphabetical order beginning with 'X'.

== X ==
=== XADRI ===
(Xi'an Aviation Design & Research Institute)

- Small Eagle 100

=== Xausa ===
(Reanato Xausa)

- Xausa X-001

=== XCOR ===
(XCOR Aerospace, Mojave, California)

- XCOR EZ-Rocket
- XCOR Mark-I X-Racer

=== Xi'an ===
(Xi'an Aircraft Industrial Corporation)

- Xi'an H-6 heavy jet bomber; license-built version of Tu-16
- Xi'an H-8 proposed bomber, intended as H-6 successor
- Xi'an H-20 projected subsonic stealth bomber
- Xi'an KJ-600 carrier-based AEW&C/cargo delivery aircraft
- Xi'an JH-7 fighter-bomber
- Xian JZY-01 carrier-based AEW&C aircraft; KJ-600 testbed
- Xi'an MA60 westernized variant of Y-7
- Xi'an MA600 improved MA60
- Xi'an MA700 twin-engine, medium-range turboprop airliner developed from the MA600
- Xian Y-7 transport/airliner; license-built version of An-24
- Xian Y-14 original designation for the Y-7H (copy of An-26)
- Xi'an Y-20 four-engine large military transport

=== Xianyi ===
- Xianyi Rosamonde (乐士文 (Rosamonde) or 1号 (Aircraft 1).)

=== XIX GmbH ===
(Kronbühl, Switzerland)

- XIX Art
- XIX Form
- XIX Inter
- XIX Sens
- XIX Smile
- XIX Top

=== XMarc ===
(Marc - Ingegno di Alberto Marchini Sas)

- XMarc Parrot

=== Xplorer UltraFlight ===
(Cape Town, South Africa)

- Xplorer Micro80
- Xplorer Xflyer
- Xplorer XS

=== XTI ===
(XTI Aircraft Company)

- XTI TriFan 600

=== XtremeAir ===
- XtremeAir Sbach 300
- XtremeAir Sbach 342
- XtremeAir Sbach X42

=== X-29 ===
- X-29 Forward Swept Wing Jet
