= Found Brothers Aviation =

Canadian aircraft manufacturer

Found Brothers Aviation was a Canadian aircraft manufacturer from its formation in 1948 to its closure in 1968. The company was succeeded by Found Aircraft.

== History ==
The company was formed at Malton, Ontario in 1948 to produce the Found FBA-1, a four-seat cabin monoplane designed by Captain S.R. Found. The aircraft was developed into an all-metal version, the FBA-2C. The aircraft entered production and 34 were built. A further improved version the Centennial was developed, this had just gained type certification in July 1968 when the company went out of business.

== Aircraft designs ==
- 1949 - Found FBA-1
- 1960 - Found FBA-2
- 1967 - Found Centennial
