= Found Aircraft =

Defunct aircraft manufacturer

Found Aircraft Canada
- Company type: Private company
- Industry: Aerospace
- Founded: 1996
- Founder: N.K. (Bud) Found
- Fate: Bankrupt 2013
- Headquarters: Parry Sound, Ontario, Canada
- Products: Certified aircraft
- Website: www.foundair.com

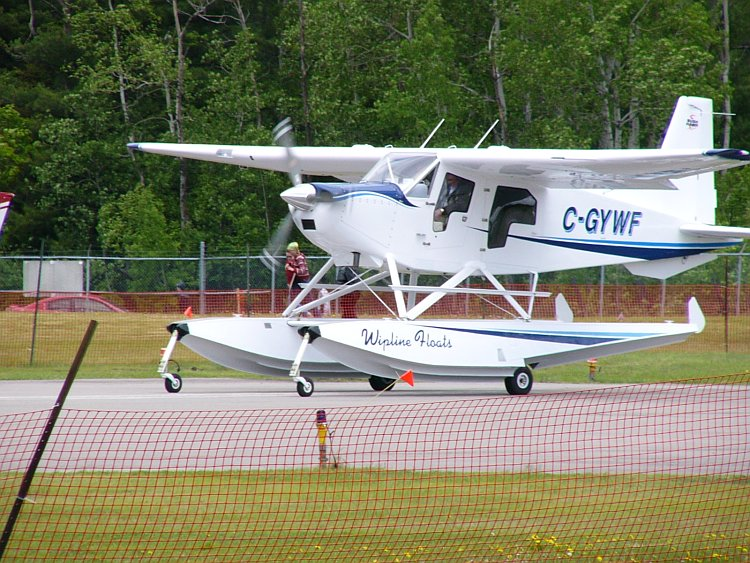
Found Aircraft FBA-2C1 Bush Hawk

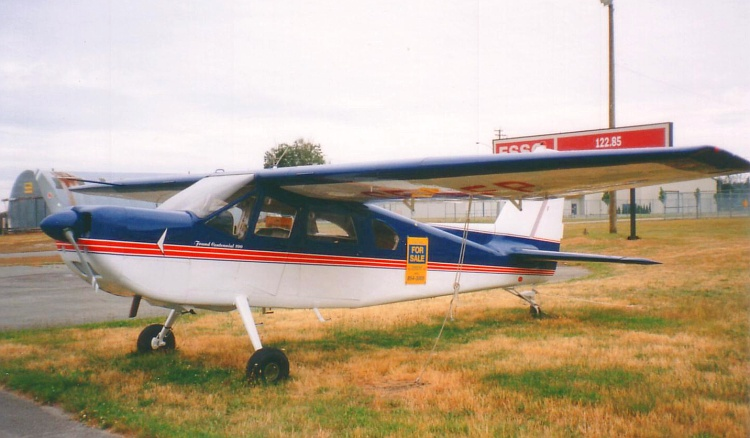
Found Aircraft Centennial 100

Found Aircraft Canada was an aircraft manufacturer based in Parry Sound, Ontario. Found originally formed in 1946 to produce a new bush plane design, the FBA-1, but entered production in 1964 with the Found FBA-2. The original company ceased production of the FBA-2 in 1967. In 1994 the company re-formed and starting in 1997 placed the FBA-2 back in production as the FBA-2C1 Bush Hawk and FBA-2C2 Bush Hawk-XP.

In 2008, two new and improved models were developed for the private pilot market. Both were built under their Expedition Aircraft brand, launched in 2007. The two models (the E350 and the E350XC) were planned for both tricycle and conventional gear. The E350 was marketed as a Cessna 206 competitor, featuring higher performance, four doors, and STOL performance. The Expedition E350 was FAA type certified in December 2008.

Found Aircraft Company ceased trading in early 2014.

== History ==
In 1946, Found Brothers Aviation was established by Nathan Keith (Bud) Found and his brother Sherman "Micky" Found, to design and build the FBA-1 aircraft. The design was based on experience gained from bush operations north of Edmonton, and down the McKenzie River to the Arctic coast. It was designed to operate on wheels, tundra tires, skis and floats and to withstand the rugged use encountered in the undeveloped regions of Canada's bush country. The FBA-1 first flew in 1949 and was used as a proof of concept aircraft.

Design refinements were started in 1950 for the FBA-2. Due to limited funds, progress was slow and this aircraft, with a tricycle landing gear, first flew in 1959. This flight demonstrated the aircraft's excellent handling qualities and, as a result, John David Eaton (of Eaton's Department Stores) purchased two aircraft for Georgian Bay Airways in Parry Sound. Mr. Eaton also ended up being the major investor behind the development of the FBA-2C production model. Certification in Canada and the United States was obtained in 1964, with production starting that year.

The company had difficulty producing the hand-made aircraft in a profitable manner and production ceased in 1967, after only twenty-seven examples had been produced. During the following thirty years, the FBA-2C developed a legendary reputation as a safe, rugged, reliable, and economical aircraft. Nine FBA-2C's remain flying in Canada today, some having over 13,000 hours of operation.

The Centennial 100 was developed as an improved version of the Found FBA-2 in 1966-67. Only five were built.

In 1994, Bud Found regained control to the rights of the aircraft. In 1996, these rights were then transferred to Found Aircraft Development. This company, and its wholly owned manufacturing subsidiary, Found Aircraft Canada, were established to develop and produce the FBA-2C1 Bush Hawk, essentially a minor update to the original in order to comply with new regulations. In 1997, Transport Canada reinstated the FBA-2C's type certificate. After two years of redevelopment work to the design, the Bush Hawk was certified in Canada in March 1999 and the United States in March 2000.

Found Aircraft's largest customer was the United States Department of the Interior, which uses the aircraft mainly in its U.S. Fish and Wildlife Service division in Alaska.

Found aircraft produced and sold the FBA-2C3 E350, which is an evolution of the 2C2 Bush Hawk, with tricycle landing gear, five seats and a Lycoming IO-580 engine producing 315 hp (235 kW).

The company entered receivership in 2013 and ceased trading completely in 2014.

== Aircraft on display ==
- The Canadian Air and Space Museum at Downsview Airport in Toronto, Ontario has the FBA-2A prototype.
- The Canada Aviation and Space Museum at the Rockcliffe Airport in Ottawa, Ontario, has FBA-2C serial #4 in its Storage Wing.
