= Found FBA-1 =

Four-seat Canadian bush airplane

FBA-1A

General information
- Type: Cabin monoplane
- Manufacturer: Found Brothers Aviation
- Designer: S.R. Found
- Number built: 1

History
- First flight: 13 July 1949
- Variants: Found FBA-2

The Found FBA-1 was a 1940s Canadian four-seat cabin monoplane produced by Found Brothers Aviation.

== Design and development ==
Found Brothers Aviation was formed in 1946 to produce a new design by Captain S.R. Found, the Found FBA-1A. The FBA-1 was a high-wing monoplane powered by a 140 hp (104 kW) de Havilland Gipsy Major engine, designed from its inception to be operated on wheels, tundra tires, skis and on floats.

The aircraft first flew on 13 July 1949. It was later developed into an all-metal four/five seater the Found FBA-2.

== Specifications (FBA-1A) ==
Data from Jane's All The World's Aircraft 1951–52

General characteristics

- Crew: 1
- Capacity: 3 passengers
- Length: 25 ft 4 in (7.72 m)
- Wingspan: 30 ft (9.1 m)
- Height: 9 ft (2.7 m)
- Wing area: 165 sq ft (15.3 m^{2})
- Powerplant: 1 × de Havilland Gipsy Major four-cylinder air-cooled inverted inline engine, 140 hp (100 kW)
