= XtremeAir =

German aircraft manufacturer

XtremeAir GmbH
- Company type: Privately held company
- Industry: Aerospace
- Founded: December 2005
- Founder: Harro Moewes
- Defunct: 2021
- Fate: Out of business
- Headquarters: Magdeburg–Cochstedt Airport, Cochstedt, Germany
- Key people: CEO: Qing Liu
- Products: Aerobatic aircraft
- Owner: Zair Aerospace
- Number of employees: 50
- Website: www.xtremeair.com

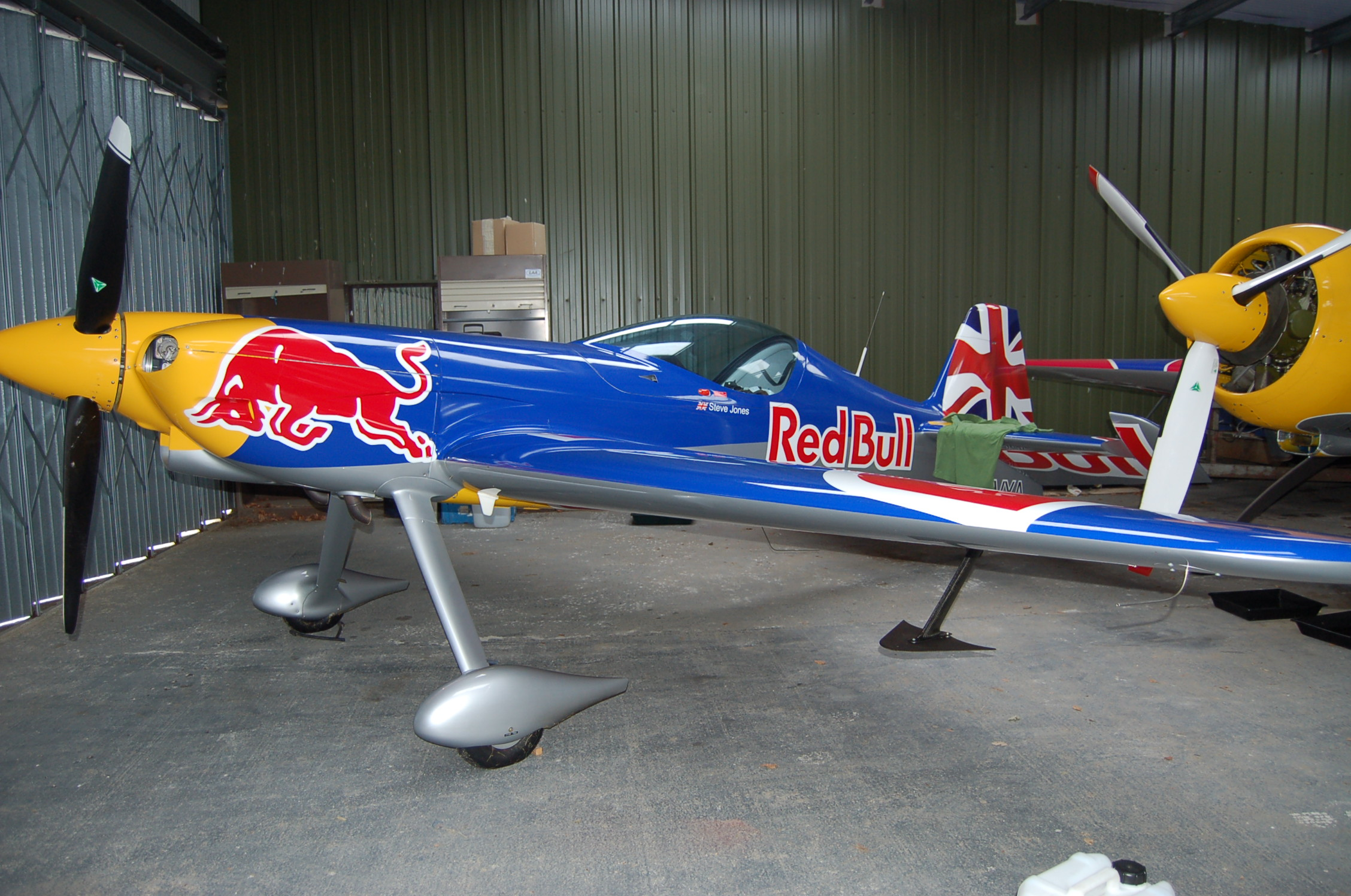
XtremeAir Sbach 300

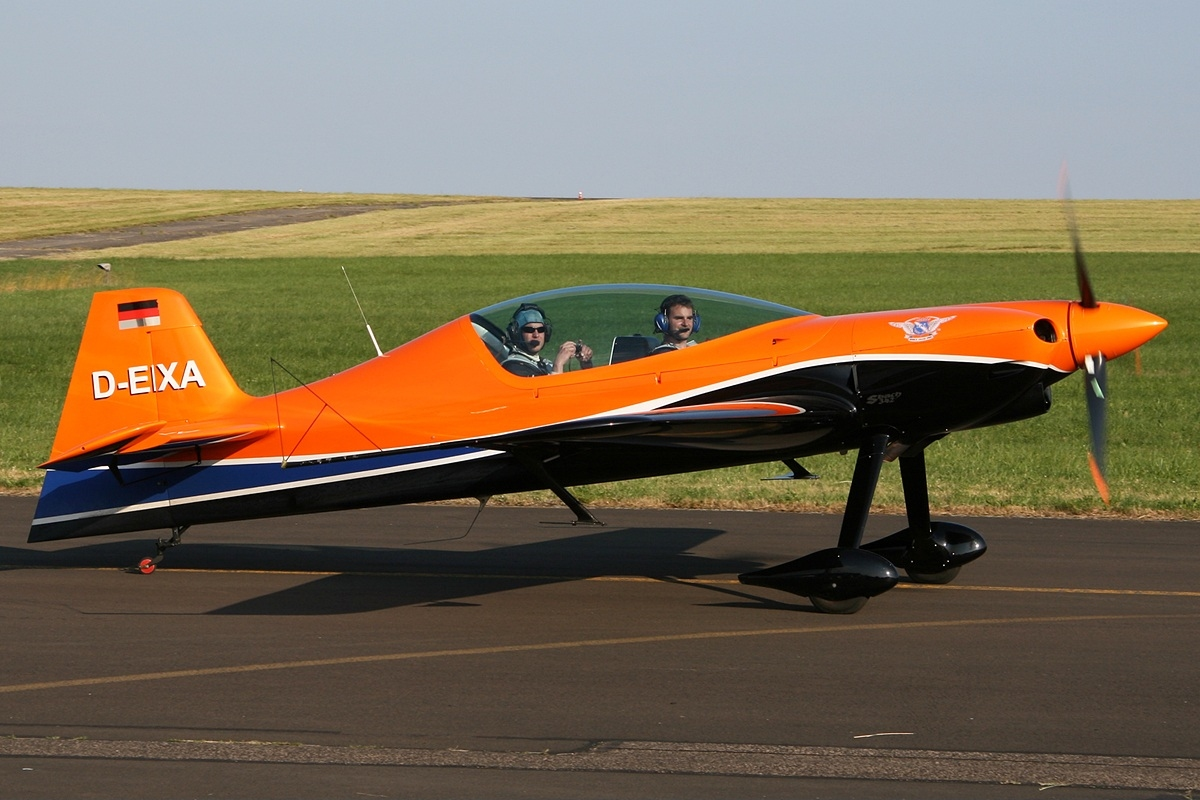
XtremeAir Sbach 342

XtremeAir GmbH was a Chinese aircraft manufacturer based in Cochstedt, Germany that was founded by Harro Moewes in December 2005. The company specialized in the design and manufacture of aerobatic aircraft in the form of type-certified designs.

== Personnel ==
The company employed about 50 people. XtremeAir's last CEO was Qing Liu and Quality Manager was Waldemar Sawenko. The Sbach series of aircraft were designed by Philipp Steinbach.

== History ==
In December 2006, the company moved into a newly constructed 2,400 m^{2} (26,000 sq ft) manufacturing plant at the Magdeburg–Cochstedt Airport.

The Sbach 300 was flown to a German national unlimited class aerobatic championship.

In 2018, XtremeAir was purchased by Chinese firm Zair Aerospace headquartered in Wuhan,

The company went into liquidation in March 2021.

== Aircraft ==
Summary of aircraft built by XtremeAir
Model name	First flight	Number built	Type
XtremeAir XA41 Sbach 300	2006		Single seat unlimited aerobatic competition aircraft
XtremeAir XA42 Sbach 342	2007	more than 44	Two seat unlimited aerobatic competition aircraft
