= Found Centennial 100 =

Canadian light aircraft

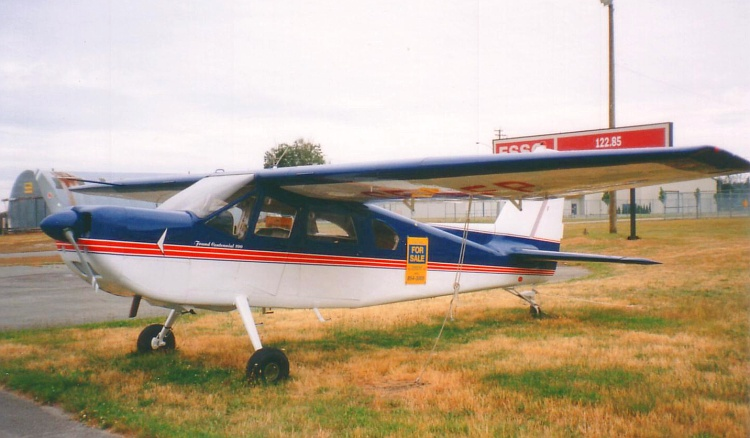

General information
- Type: Cabin monoplane
- Manufacturer: Found Brothers Aviation
- Designer: S.R. Found
- Number built: 5

History
- First flight: 7 April 1967
- Developed from: Found FBA-2

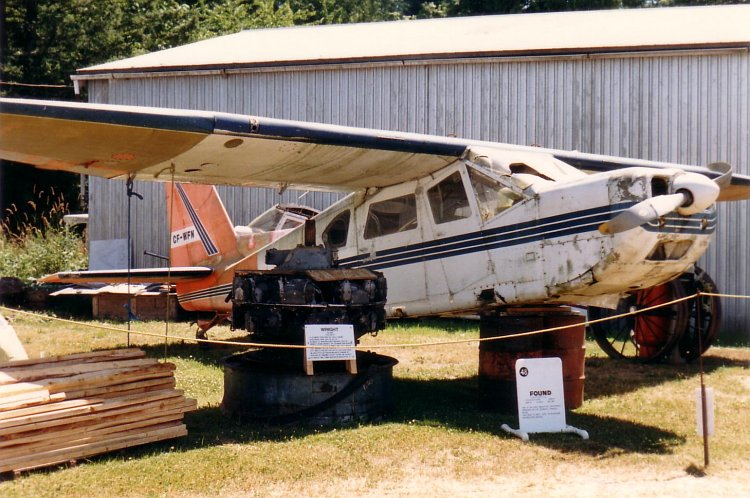
Found Centennial 100 CF-WFN at the Canadian Museum of Flight in 1988

The Found Centennial 100 is a Canadian six-seat cabin monoplane produced by Found Brothers Aviation.

== Design and development ==
The Centennial 100 was developed as an improved version of the Found FBA-2. Design work started in October 1966 and the prototype first flew on 7 April 1967. The aircraft is powered by a 290 hp (216 kW) Avco Lycoming IO-540-G1D5 engine. Three prototypes and two production aircraft were built and were used to gain certification for the type in July 1968. No further aircraft were built as the company went out of business.

== Specifications (Centennial) ==
Data from Jane's All The World's Aircraft 1969-70

General characteristics

- Crew: 1
- Capacity: 5 passengers
- Length: 26 ft 6 in (8.08 m)
- Wingspan: 39 ft 0 in (11.89 m)
- Height: 8 ft 4 in (2.54 m)
- Wing area: 196.6 sq ft (18.26 m^{2})
- Aspect ratio: 7.2:1
- Airfoil: NACA 23016 at root, NACA 23012 at tip
- Empty weight: 2,000 lb (907 kg)
- Max takeoff weight: 3,500 lb (1,588 kg)
- Fuel capacity: 50.5 imp gal (60.6 US gal; 230 L)
- Powerplant: 1 × Avco Lycoming IO-540-G1D5 air-cooled flat-six engine, 290 hp (220 kW)
- Propellers: 2-bladed Hatzell metal constant speed propeller, 7 ft 4 in (2.24 m) diameter

Performance

- Maximum speed: 162 mph (261 km/h, 141 kn) at sea level
- Cruise speed: 140 mph (230 km/h, 120 kn) (Econ. cruise, 65% power)
- Stall speed: 55 mph (89 km/h, 48 kn) (flaps down)
- Range: 700 mi (1,100 km, 610 nmi)
- Service ceiling: 18,000 ft (5,500 m)
- Rate of climb: 1,250 ft/min (6.4 m/s)
- Takeoff run to 50 ft (15 m): 1,020 ft (310 m)
- Landing run from 50 ft (15 m): 950 ft (290 m)

== See also ==
- Found Aircraft
- Found FBA-2
