= 2002 Pirelli Tower airplane crash =

Airplane crash in Milan, Italy

- Impact zone in the Pirelli Tower

Accident
- Date: 18 April 2002; 23 years ago
- Summary: Collision with building
- Site: Pirelli Tower, Milan, Italy; 45°29′05″N 9°12′05″E
- Total fatalities: 3
- Total injuries: 60-70

Aircraft
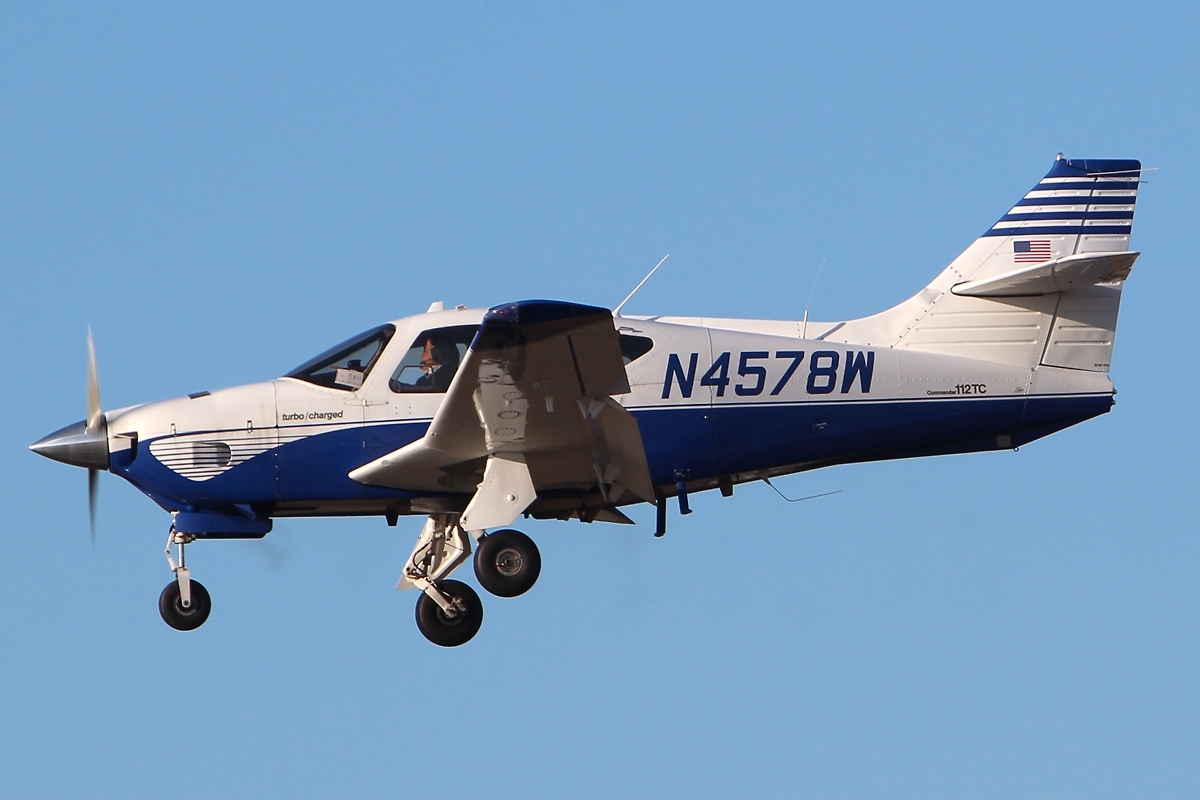
- A Rockwell Commander 112, similar to the aircraft involved
- Aircraft type: Rockwell Commander 112TC
- Operator: Private
- Registration: HB-NCX
- Flight origin: Locarno Airport, Magadino, Switzerland
- Destination: Milan Linate Airport, Milan, Italy
- Occupants: 1
- Crew: 1
- Survivors: 0

Ground casualties
- Ground fatalities: 2
- Ground injuries: 60-70

On 18 April 2002, a privately operated single-engine Rockwell Commander 112TC flying from Locarno Airport, Switzerland, to Milan Linate Airport, Italy, crashed into the upper floors of the Pirelli Tower in Milan, Italy. The pilot – the aircraft's sole occupant – and two building employees were killed, and 60-70 others were injured.

Although initial suspicions pointed to a terrorist attack, owing to the crash occurring a few months after the September 11 attacks, investigators stated that the crash was likely an accident. Despite ensuing suspicions that the pilot had intentionally flown the aircraft into the tower, the theory was ruled out. A subsequent investigation by the ANSV found that the pilot was likely unable to "adequately manage the final phase of the flight in the presence of technical, operational, and environmental issues."

== Aircraft and crew ==
The aircraft involved was a Rockwell Commander 112TC registered as HB-NCX, manufactured in 1976. The Rockwell Commander is a small aircraft powered by a Lycoming TO-360-C1A6D piston engine; the aircraft can reach a maximum altitude of 6,000 metres (20,000 ft) and can seat a pilot and three passengers. The Rockwell Commander also has a fuel tank capacity of 257 litres (68 US gal). The aircraft was owned and piloted by 67-year-old Luigi Fasulo.

== Accident ==
At 17:45, the aircraft crashed into the deck beams of the 26th and 27th floor of the Pirelli Tower, resulting in the explosion of the aircraft's fuel tanks placed near the wings.

The crash killed the pilot and two lawyers who were in the tower. At the time of the crash, most of the region's workers had left their offices; 300 people were in the Pirelli Tower compared to an average of 1300 people.

Between thirty and forty people were taken to the hospital with moderate injuries, while fire-fighters contained the fire that resulted from the crash. Immediately after the crash, the nearby Milan central railway station, metro station and the Linate airport were closed.

== Aftermath ==
The crash aroused fears of a terrorist attack since it occurred seven months after the September 11 attacks. Because of this, stock markets around the United States and Europe fell sharply, and business trading in Milan was suspended. The fears ended when investigators concluded that the crash was not an act of terrorism.

== Investigation ==
The National Agency for the Safety of Flight (ANSV) was first notified of the crash by a journalist. The ANSV then formed an investigative team and proceeded to the crash site to begin their investigation.

== See also ==
- 1945 Empire State Building B-25 crash
- 2002 Tampa Cessna 172 crash
- 2006 New York City Cirrus SR20 crash
