= Rockwell Commander 112 =

US four-seat single-engined general aviation aircraft, USA

Commander 112/114
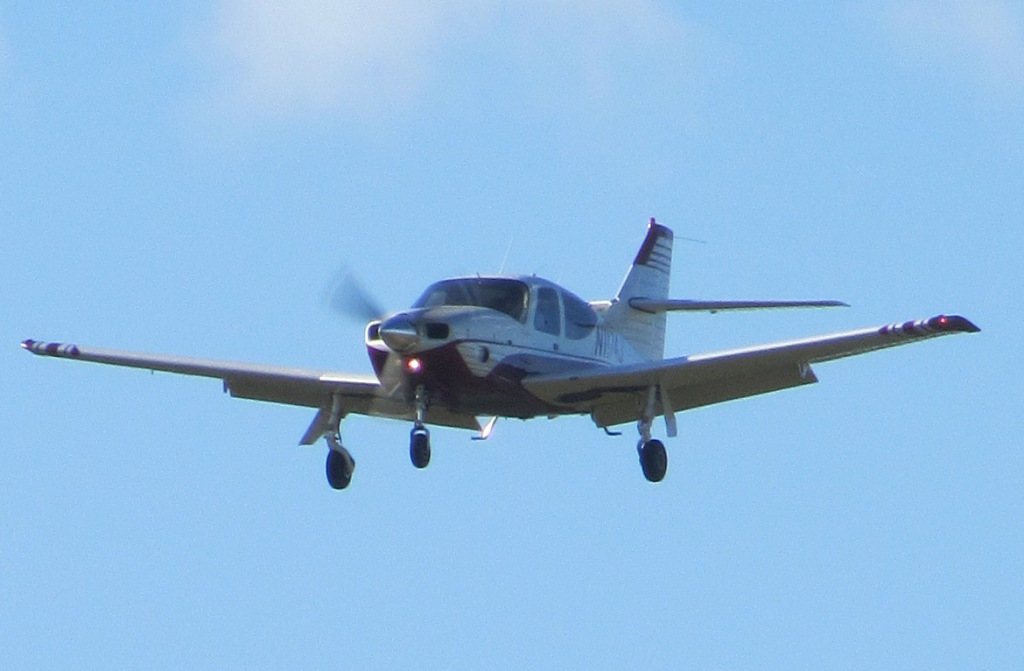
- Commander 112

General information
- Type: Four-seat personal transportation
- National origin: United States
- Manufacturer: North American Rockwell; Rockwell International; Commander Aircraft Co.
- Status: In service
- Primary user: Private individuals, aeroclubs, military
- Number built: 1,490 (111:2, 112:803, 114:501, 114B:154, 115:30)

History
- Manufactured: 1972–1980, 1992–2002
- Introduction date: 1972
- First flight: 4 December 1970

The Rockwell Commander 112 is an American four-seat single-engined general aviation aircraft designed and built by North American Rockwell (later Rockwell International) starting in 1972. In 1976, they introduced the turbocharged version 112TC and mounting a larger engine with other minor improvements they introduced the Rockwell Commander 114. A total of approximately 1,300 examples of all models were produced before the production line shut down in 1980. In 1981, the type certificate owner was Gulfstream Aerospace, but that company had no interest in single-engine piston production.

The rights to the design were sold to Commander Aircraft Company in 1988. They improved the interior and made other upgrades to the Commander 114B series, released in 1992. Approximately 200 examples were produced before they shut down in 2002. Aircraft produced between 2000 and 2002 were named Commander 115 for commercial purposes. Between 2005 and 2012, the Commander Premier Aircraft Corporation (CPAC) was producing spare parts only. An attempt to begin production was made by CPAC who planned a Commander 115 series; however, as of 2016, financial issues had delayed production indefinitely. The total number of all airframes produced under the Commander name was approximately 1490 examples (111:2, 112:803, 114:501+154, 115:30).

== Development ==
=== Original production ===
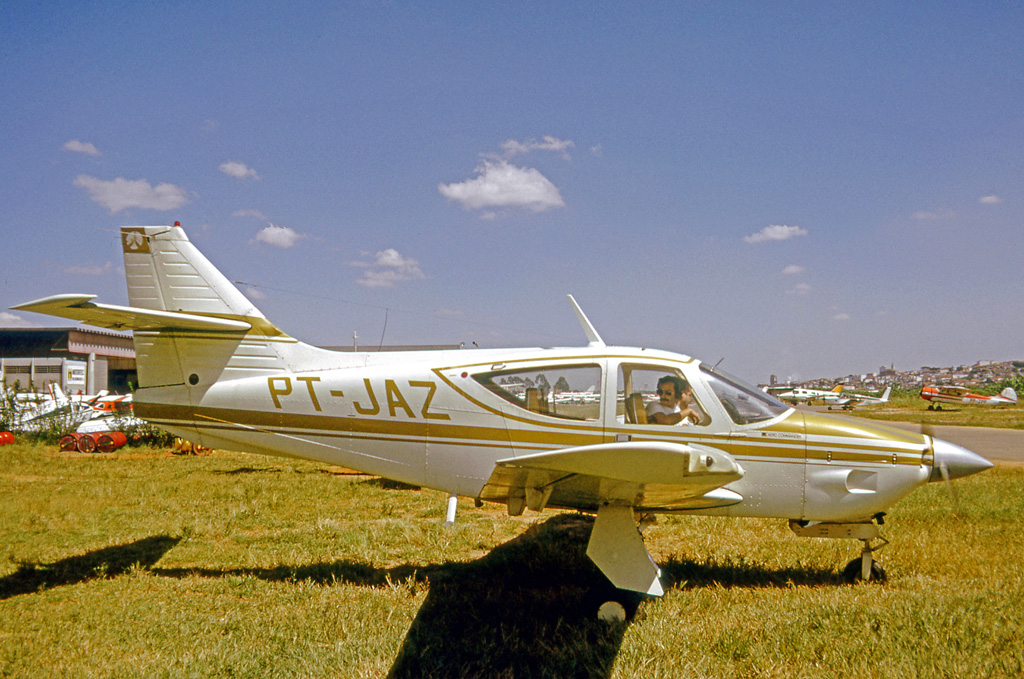
Brazilian-registered Commander 112 at São Paulo's Campo de Marte Airport in 1975.

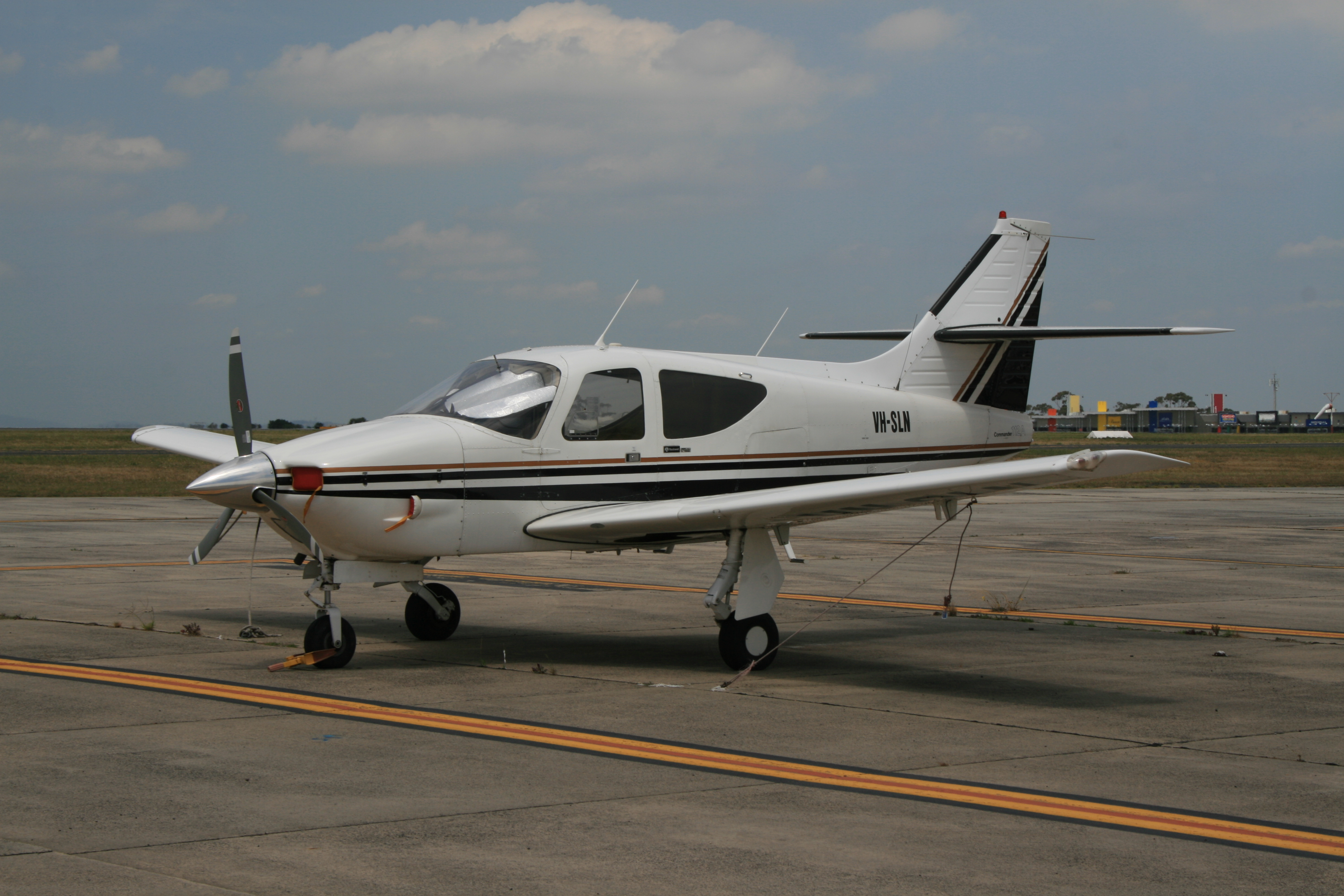
A late-build Commander 112A, sharing many similarities with the 114.

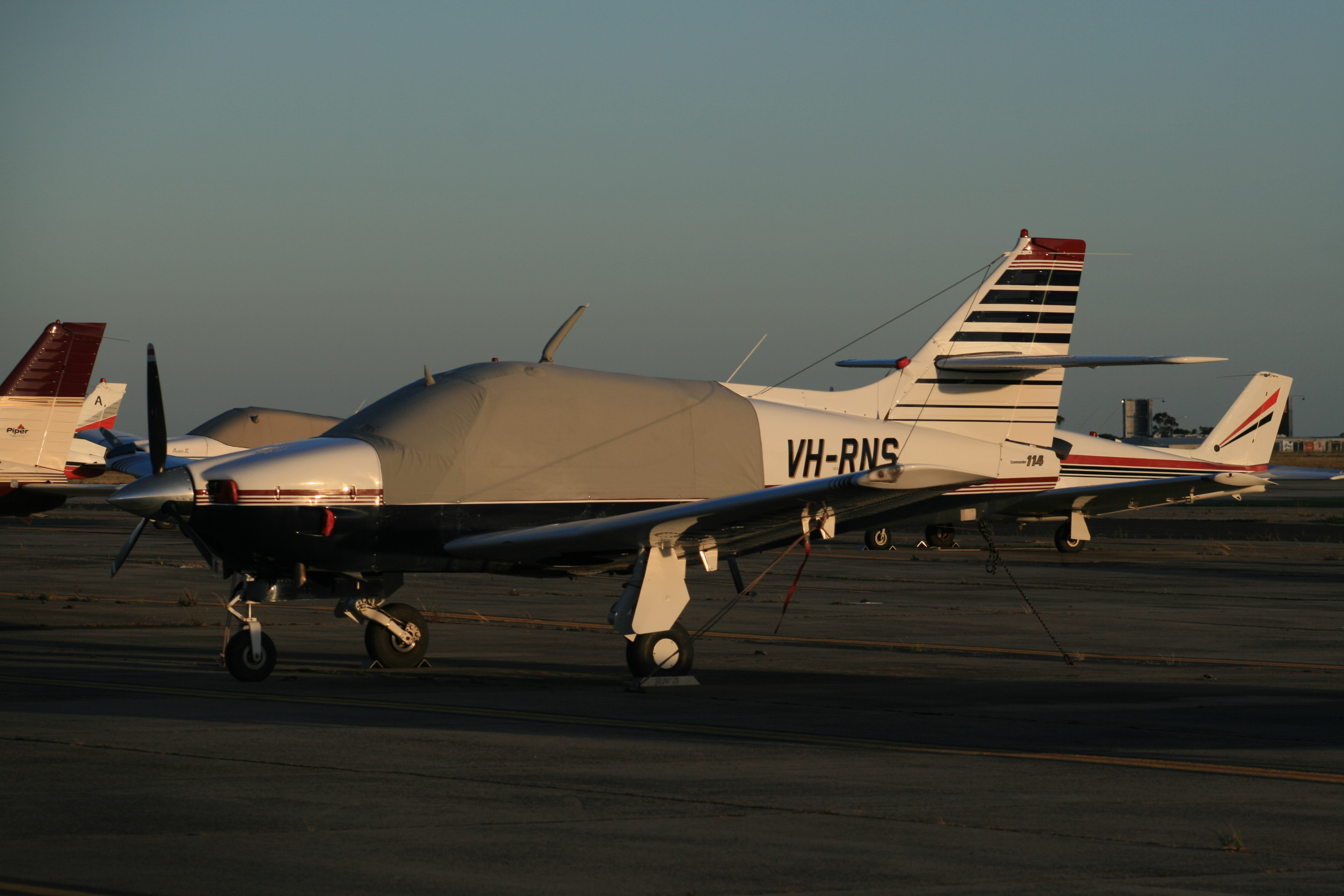
A late-model 114; with a different-shaped engine cowling and fresh-air inlet in the leading edge of the tail fin (seen in this photo with a red plug to prevent birds entering).

In 1970, Rockwell's Aero Commander division developed a new line of aircraft that would span everything from the fixed-gear four-seat market to a retractable twin-engine six-seat design

The first models of this lineup were two versions of a four-seat low-wing monoplane, the fixed tricycle landing gear Commander 111 and the retractable tricycle landing gear Commander 112. The 111 was marketed at $17,950 and 112 at $22,100 ($148814 and $183220 in 2025). Only two prototype Commander 111s were built; the company decided that only the Commander 112 would go into production.

The design had a modern look and considerable interior room that set it apart from older designs like the Piper Cherokee and Beechcraft Bonanza. As one reviewer put it:

If people bought airplanes based on looks and roominess alone, there would likely be a lot more Rockwell Commanders out in the field. This stout, four-seat single has a stylish look that is noticeably absent among many airplane designs dating to the 1950s and '60s. On the ramp the Commander's rakish nose, towering tail, and upright stance set it apart from its dowdy-looking competitors. Likewise, its interior volume is closer to that of a cabin-class twin than other four-seat singles.

The design had been made to follow the newly released FAR Part 23 standards for light aircraft, which had an emphasis on gust response and fatigue mitigation. The resulting design boasted considerable strength, a fact that Rockwell marketed heavily. Unfortunately, this also had an impact on performance, and in spite of its clean lines the 112 was slightly slower than similar aircraft like the Piper Arrow.

A prototype Commander 112 crashed after the tail failed during testing, which led to a redesign of the tail unit. This delayed the delivery of the first production aircraft until late in 1972. It also led to changes that further increased the weight of the aircraft. This resulted in its being seriously underpowered; the 112 prototype was powered by a 180 hp (134 kW) Lycoming O-360 engine, this was replaced by a 200 hp (149 kW) IO-360 engine in production aircraft. Even with this engine, there is widespread agreement that the aircraft was underpowered. Another annoyance was that the fibreglass composite doors did not fit well and tended to leak.

=== New versions ===
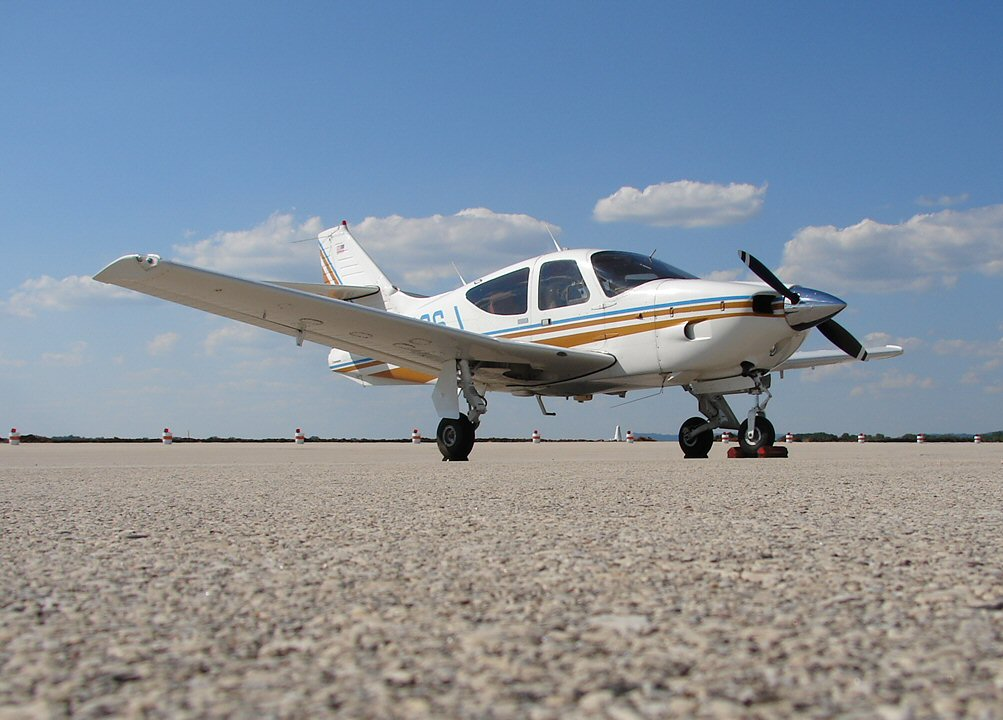
Commander 112

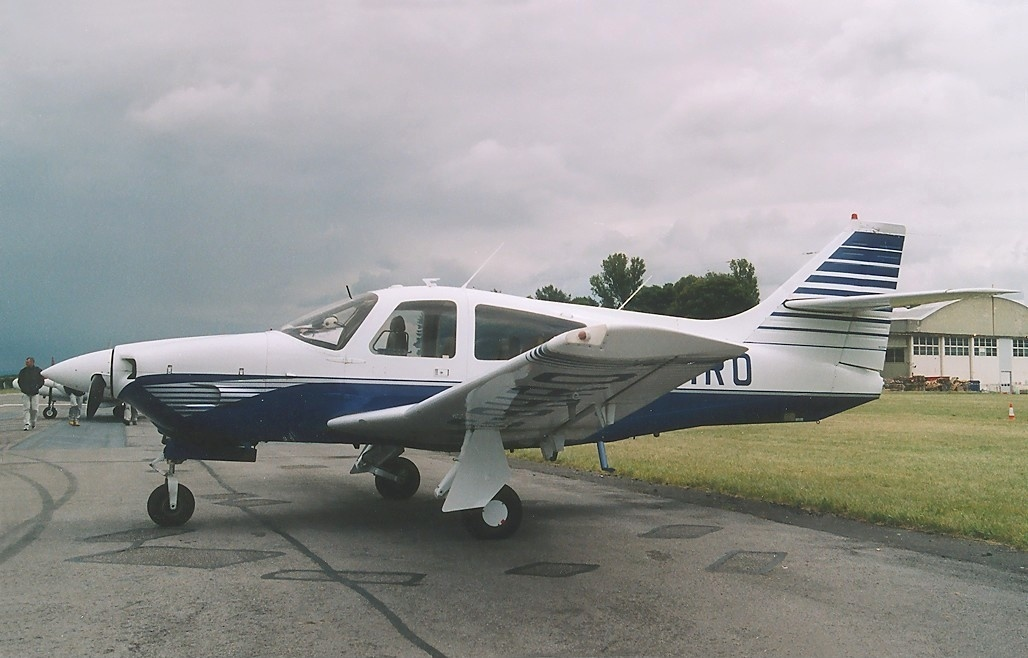
Commander 112A

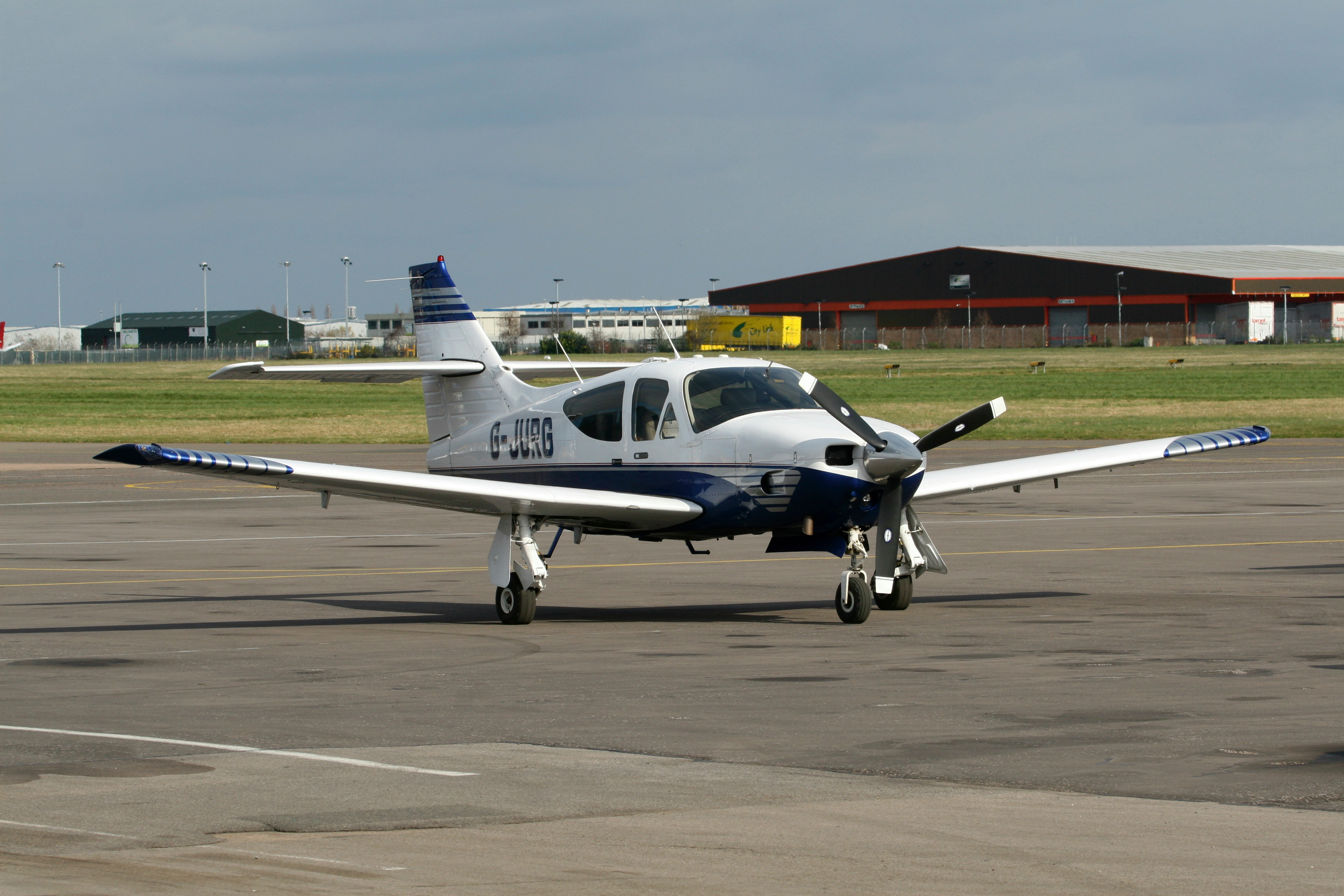
Commander 114A

In 1974, after 123 production aircraft had been built, a number of improvements were made to the 112, producing the 112A. The doors were fixed by replacing them with new aluminum units, which added still more weight, but had the benefit of making the cabin quieter. The wing was redesigned internally with increased fuel capacity and a 100 lb increase in maximum takeoff weight (MTOW) to 2,650 lb. After another 30 112s were built, Rockwell offered an option for increased fuel capacity (68 US gallon vs. 48 gallon standard tanks).

The 1976 Commander line introduced two new models, the Commander 112TC with a turbocharged engine of 210 hp and MTOW of 2,850 lb, and the Commander 114 with a six-cylinder Lycoming IO-540 engine of 260 hp. The 112TC had a significantly improved cruise speed of 160 knots (300 km/h; 180 mph) when flying at higher altitudes, as high as 20,000 feet (6,100 m), which was aided by a 32 inches (810 mm) increase in wingspan. However, the low climb performance made this useful only on long trips where the climb time was not a serious issue. In comparison, the 114 offered a far better powerplant for the airframe, providing roughly the same cruise speed as the 112TC but at lower altitudes, and the extra power giving it far better climb performance.

In 1977, the wing span stretch of the TC model was applied to the base 112 to produce the 112B. This allowed the 112B's maximum takeoff weight to rise to 2,800 pounds (1,300 kg), giving it a respectable useful load of 1,000 pounds (450 kg). Production of the 112B ended in 1979, while the 112TC was further upgraded with a 50 pounds (23 kg) maximum weight increase and minor detail changes. The major change was a complete makeover of the avionics suite with a three-axis autopilot, producing the 112TCA "Alpine". This offered little more performance than the original 112TC, and was more expensive than similar offerings from other companies. A smaller set of upgrades, notably a three-bladed propeller and a slightly raised maximum takeoff weight of 3,250 pounds (1,470 kg), produced the 114A "Gran Turismo". The 112TCA and 114A remained in production until 1980, when Rockwell shut down the production line with about 1,000 examples of the different models having been delivered.

=== Commander Aircraft ===
Following the end of production in 1981, Rockwell sold the design rights to the Aero Commander suite to Gulfstream American. Gulfstream was only interested in the Turbo Commander, and did not restart production of the 112/114 series. In 1988, Gulfstream sold the rights to Randall Greene, who set up Commander Aircraft to provide support for existing aircraft and build new aircraft.

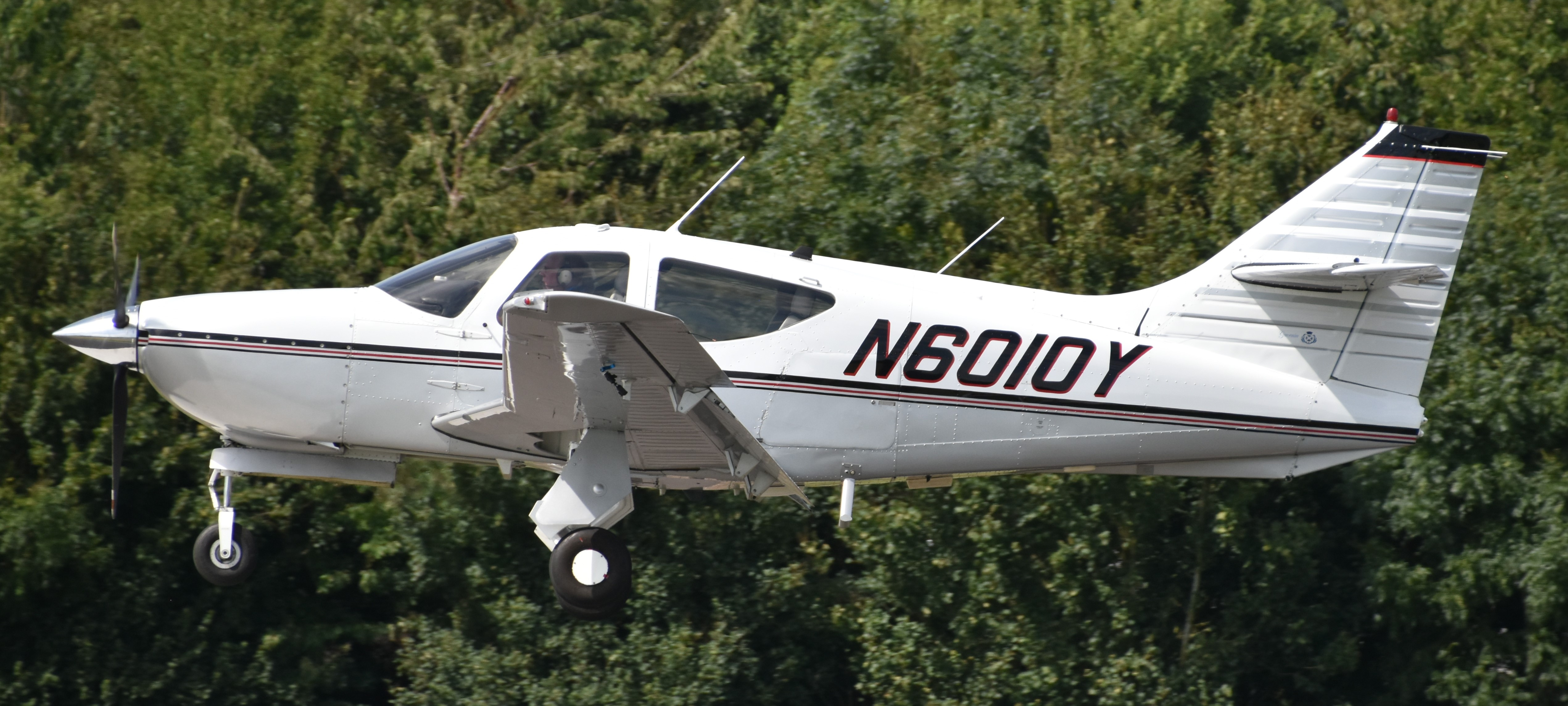
Commander 114B produced by CAC

The design was given a fairly extensive set of upgrades and recertified as the Commander 114B in 1992. Among the changes were a new streamlined cowling, strengthening of the airframe, changes to various air intakes, and a new prop. These improved cruise speed by a significant 8 knots (15 km/h; 9.2 mph), making it more competitive with similar models from other companies. More significant upgrades were carried out in the interior, which received a high-quality leather upholstery upgrade, reading lamps, better soundproofing and an optional powerful air conditioning unit. One reviewer summed it up as "an ultra-spacious interior that looks more like a luxury car than a spam can".

In 1995, they added the 114TC, a version of the 114B with a 260 hp turbocharged engine, primarily to improve high altitude cruise speed to just over 200 knots (370 km/h; 230 mph)s. The company marketed the aircraft primarily to non-traditional markets, namely Wall Street executives, via The Wall Street Journal, Forbes, and Fortune, and middle eastern executives, for whom the extremely powerful air conditioning system was added.

The company had plans to reintroduce the 114B and 114TC as the 115 and 115TC. These featured a host of upgrades, mostly to the interior and avionics. However, these plans ended when production ended in 2002 after about 200 114Bs and turbocharged 114TCs had been built, and Commander Aircraft was subsequently liquidated.

=== Commander Premier Aircraft ===
In 2005, the Commander Premier Aircraft Corporation (CPAC) was formed by over 50 owners of Commanders, in order to provide spare parts support for their aircraft. Commander Premier purchased the assets of Commander Aircraft from the bankruptcy trustee in mid-2005 and moved all production equipment from Oklahoma City to a new facility in Cape Girardeau, Missouri.

In addition to planning to produce the 115 and 115TC, they also planned on selling a cut-down 115AT ("Advanced Trainer") with a simplified interior, crew training and a complete set of spares, intending to sell it to pilot training schools looking for a high performance trainer.

CPAC was sold to Ronald G. Strauss in 2009, and was to fall under the ownership of Aero-Base, a firm which Strauss owned. While CPAC had failed to establish a stable aircraft manufacturing operation in the city-financed factory at the Cape Girardeau Regional Airport, it did at least manufacture parts and provide aircraft service. In October 2011, CPAC was evicted from its city-owned hangar for unpaid lease obligations. By May 2012, CPAC was back in bankruptcy, the deal by Canadian financier Strauss having failed to achieve traction, with an unnamed firm not associated with Strauss showing interest in purchasing the company.

=== Super Commander ===
Jim Richards purchased a 1977 Commander 114, was unimpressed with its performance, and began looking for a solution. This presented itself in the form of the Lycoming IO-580, released in 1997. This is roughly the same size as the IO-540 and only slightly heavier, but offers 320 hp, a significant improvement over the 260 hp of the stock 114. Richards formed Aerodyme Corporation to sell and service conversions consisting of the engine, 78-inch Hartzell three-blade Scimitar prop and a new cowl to fit it. At least one 115 was also converted in this fashion, known as the "Super Commander".

== Description ==
The 112 and 114 are conventional layout monoplanes with the main wing set low and a mid-mounted horizontal stabilizer. This places the stabilizer outside the prop wash, and results in heavier handling at lower speeds.

The cabin is 47 inches (1,200 mm) wide and 49 inches (1,200 mm) high, compared to a contemporary aircraft like the Piper Arrow at 41 inches (1,000 mm) by 38 inches (970 mm). This was the most spacious cabin of any design of the era. There is a full-sized door on both sides of the aircraft, while most aircraft of this class have a full-sized passenger door on one side and a smaller door for the pilot on the other.

The low mounted wing has significant dihedral and features fully faired retractible main landing gear. The gear use the trailing-link design for additional travel and softer "even less-than-perfect" landings. The 112B, 112TC-A and 114A received larger main wheels and disc brakes as part of their upgrades.

Both the wings and fuselage were built using new construction methods that built sections as complete assemblies rather than riveting together many individual parts. The aircraft has far fewer rivets than contemporary designs. As part of the 1976 modifications, various air scoops were moved and redesigned, offering a slight performance increase, while the extended wing tips reduced the stall speed from 62 miles per hour (100 km/h) to 58 miles per hour (93 km/h) in the 112A.

Early models featured front seat three-point harnesses where the shoulder belt was fixed to the seat itself. This was found to offer too little strength and was replaced with one fixed to the fuselage behind the seat as part of a 1987 Airworthiness Directive (AD). In spite of being designed specifically to avoid fatigue issues, the series has been subject to a number of ADs due to fatigue cracking, both in the main wing and the elevator.

== Variants ==
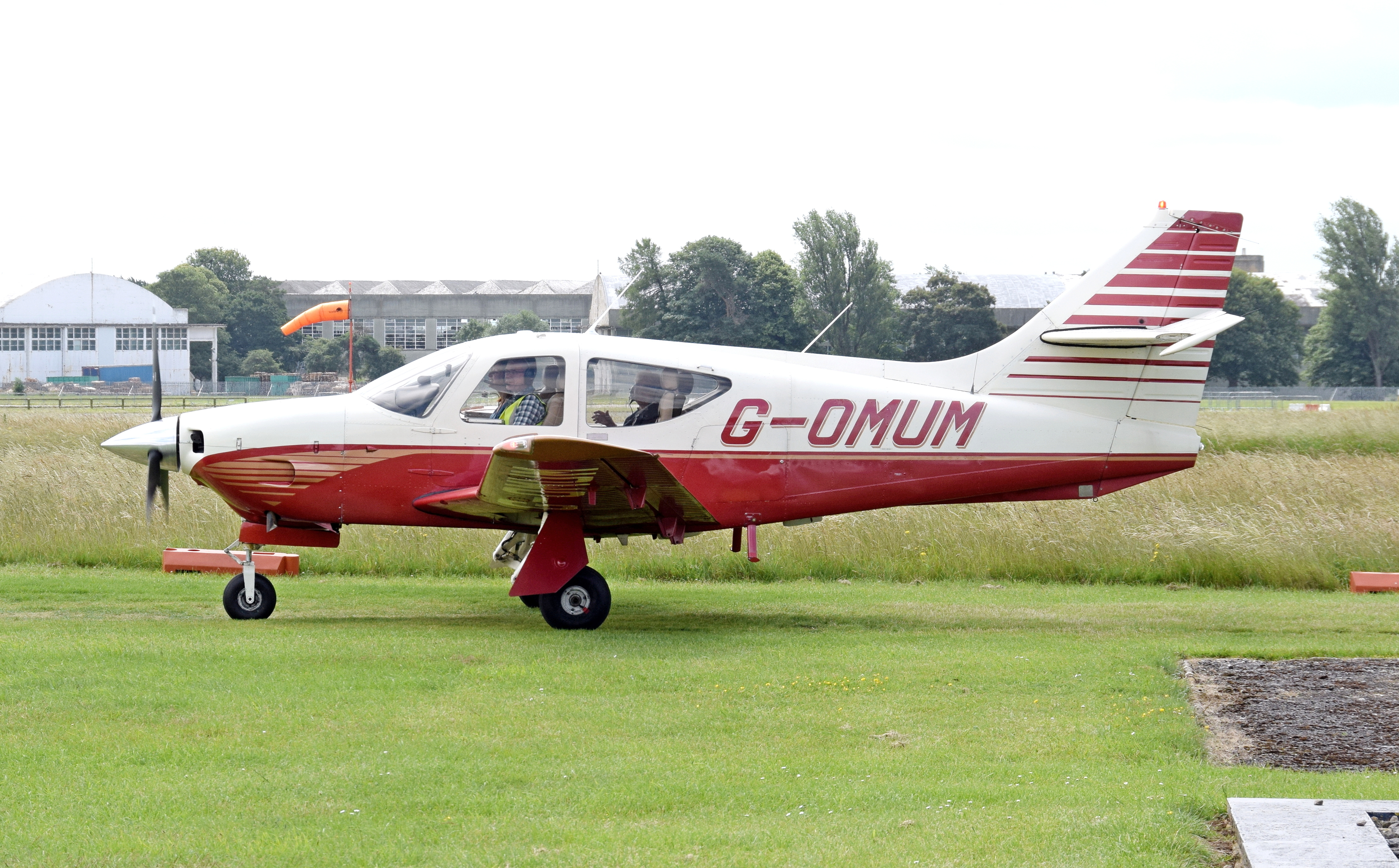
Rockwell Commander 114 (built 1976)

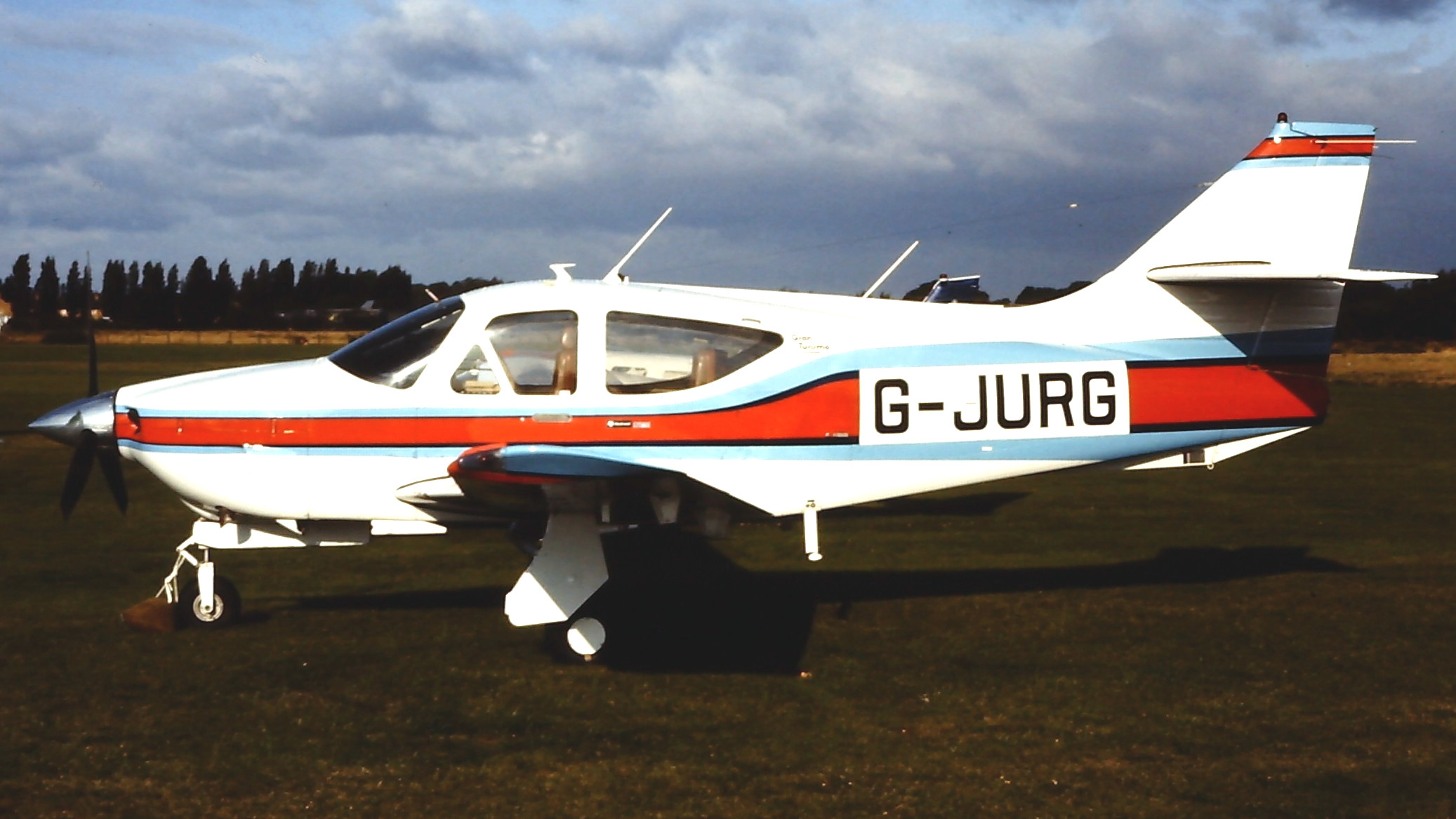
A 1979-built 114A.

111
Fixed landing gear variant powered by a 180 hp (130 kW) Lycoming O-360-A1G6 engine, two prototypes built.
112
Production variant with retractable landing gear and powered by a 200 hp (150 kW) Lycoming IO-360-C1D6, 125 built.
112A
Marketing name for a strengthened variant of the 112 to meet the FAR23 Amendment 7 requirements with increased maximum takeoff weight, 363 built.
112B
112A with an increased maximum takeoff weight, increased wingspan, new propeller and larger wheels, 44 built.
Serial numbers 500 and subsequent.
112TC
112A with turbocharged Lycoming TO-360-C1A6D engine, 109 built.
Serial numbers 13000 thru 13108.
112TCA
112TC with increased load and higher takeoff weight and other improvements similar to 112B, later named Alpine Commander, 160 built.
Serial numbers 13150 and subsequent.
114
112 with a 260 hp (190 kW) Lycoming IO-540-T4A5D engine, 460 built.
114A
114 updated similar to 112B, later named Gran Turismo, 41 built.
114B
Variant of 114A built by Commander Aircraft with new propeller, revised engine cowling and a Lycoming IO-540-T45BD engine. Marketed as 115 from 2000.
114AT
Trainer version of 114B with dual controls and modified interior. Marketed as 115AT from 2000.
114TC
Variant of 114B with 270 hp (200 kW) turbocharged Lycoming TIO-540-AGIA engine. Marketed as 115TC from 2000.
Super Commander
Supplemental Type Certificate modification package including the Lycoming IO-580 engine, three bladed prop, and new cowling.

== Operators ==
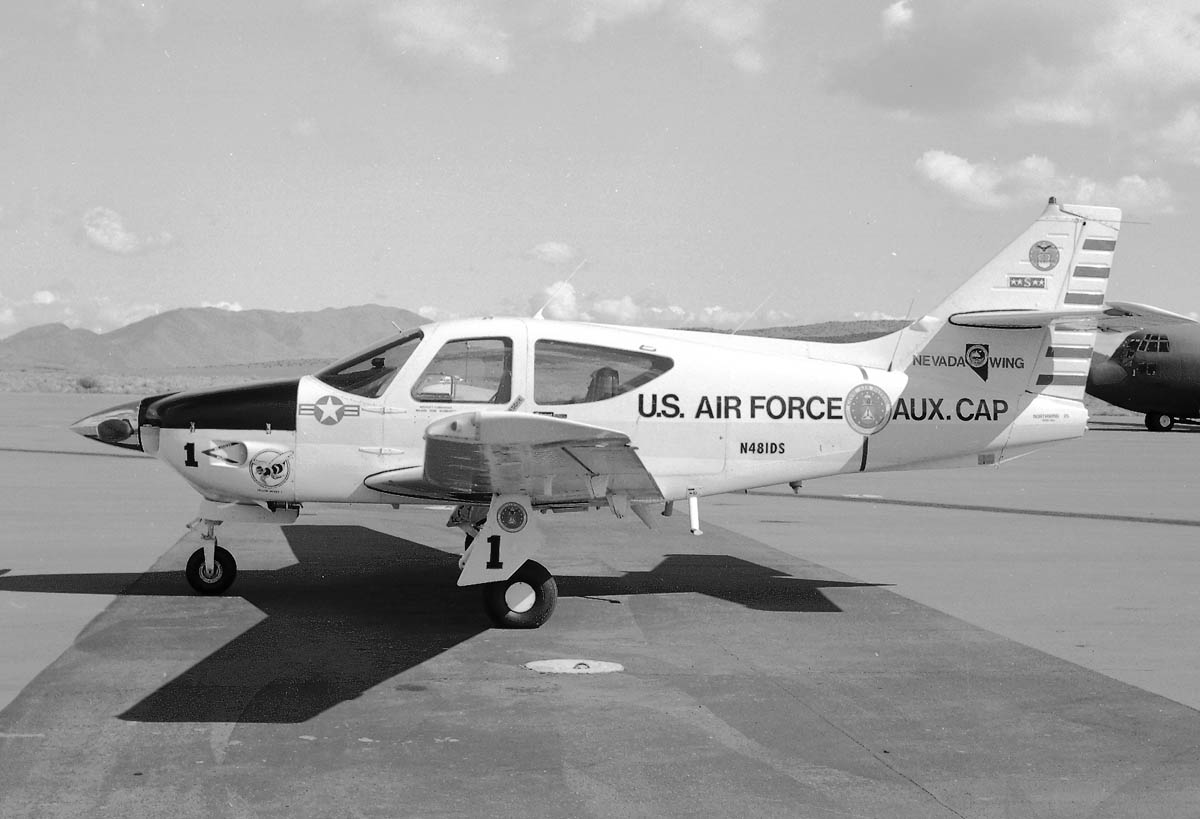
Rockwell Commander 112TC N481DS 1985

=== Civilian operators ===
The 114 is popular with some flight training organizations in the US for complex and high-performance airplane endorsement according to FAR 61.31. In the EASA environment, it is used for variable pitch propeller and retractable undercarriage endorsement flight training. It is suitable for CPL(A) license training and single-engine instrument rating. The Commander is mostly operated by flying clubs and private individuals.

United States

- Eagle Aircraft Flight Academy: Rockwell Commander 112TC

Slovenia

- Letalski center Maribor: Commander 114B (in service), Rockwell Commander 112A (historical)

=== Military operators ===
Gibraltar
El Salvador
Honduras
United States

- Civil Air Patrol Nevada Wing: Rockwell Commander 112TC (historical)

== Specifications (114B 1992) ==
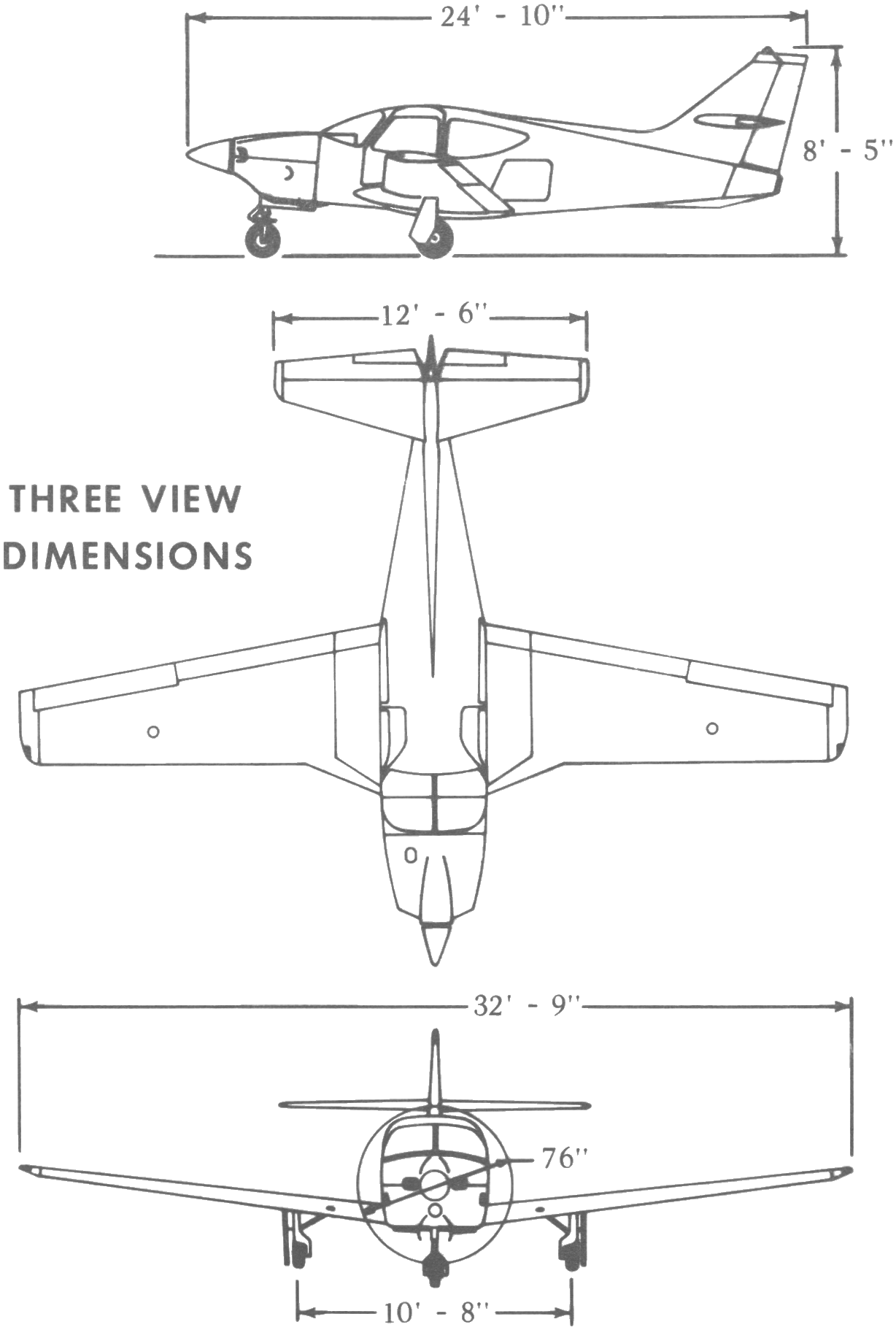
3-view line drawing of the Aero Commander 112

Data from

General characteristics

- Crew: 1
- Capacity: 3 passengers
- Length: 24 ft 11 in (7.59 m)
- Wingspan: 32 ft 9 in (9.98 m)
- Height: 8 ft 5 in (2.57 m)
- Wing area: 152 sq ft (14.1 m^{2})
- Empty weight: 2,077 lb (942 kg)
- Gross weight: 3,260 lb (1,479 kg)
- Max takeoff weight: 3,250 lb (1,474 kg)
- Fuel capacity: 70 USGal
- Max landing weight: 3,140 lb (1,420 kg)
- Max zero fuel weight: 3,000 lb (1,400 kg)
- Max baggage weight: 200 lb (91 kg)
- Powerplant: 1 × Textron Lycoming IO-540-T4B5, 260 hp (190 kW)
- Propellers: 3-bladed McCauley B3O32C4 L 9/82NHA-5

Performance

- Maximum speed: 164 kn (189 mph, 304 km/h)
- Cruise speed: 135–155 kn (155–178 mph, 250–287 km/h)
- Stall speed: 60 kn (69 mph, 110 km/h)
- Never exceed speed: 187 kn (215 mph, 346 km/h)
- Range: 600 nmi (690 mi, 1,100 km) at 75% Power
- Ferry range: 720 nmi (830 mi, 1,330 km) Long Range Cruise at 55% Power
- Endurance: 4h 10' at 75%, 5h 50' at 55%
- Service ceiling: 14,200 ft (4,300 m) at MTOM
- g limits: +3.8g to -1.52g Aerobatic maneuvers are prohibited
- Maximum glide ratio: 9.9 (gear up)
- Rate of climb: 1,070 ft/min (5.4 m/s) Initial Sea Level Rate
- Wing loading: 21.4 lb/sq ft (104 kg/m^{2})
- Takeoff distance to 50 ft (15 m): 1,985 ft (605 m) at Sea Level
- Landing distance from 50 ft (15 m): 1,200 ft (370 m) at Sea Level

Avionics
BendixKing, Garmin, Sandel, Hoskins, Insight, S-TEC, Bennett

== See also ==
- 2002 Pirelli Tower plane crash
