= XtremeAir Sbach 300 =

German Aerobatic aircraft

Sbach 300
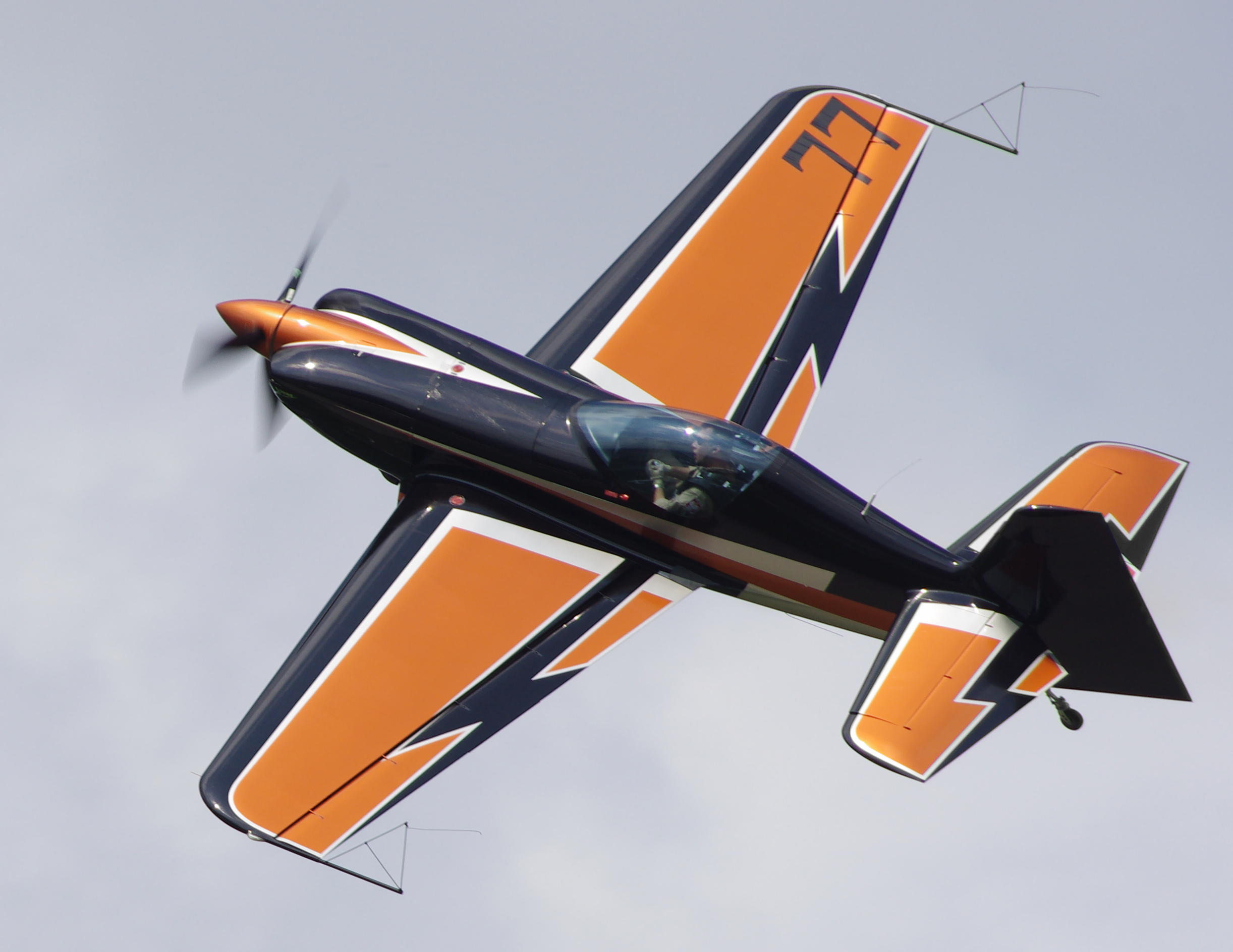

General information
- Type: Aerobatic aircraft
- National origin: Germany
- Manufacturer: XtremeAir
- Designer: Philippe Steinbach
- Status: In production (2012)

History
- Variant: XtremeAir Sbach 342

The XtremeAir Sbach 300 is a German aerobatic aircraft, designed by Philippe Steinbach and produced by XtremeAir, of Cochstedt. The aircraft is supplied as a complete ready-to-fly-aircraft.

The aircraft bears the company designation XA41, but is marketed under the name Sbach 300, although use of this name was later abandoned.

== Design and development ==
The Sbach 300 is an all-composite design, predominantly constructed of carbon fibre. It features a cantilever low-wing, a single-seat enclosed cockpit under a bubble canopy, fixed conventional landing gear and a single engine in tractor configuration. The aircraft's 7.50 m (24.6 ft) span wing has an area of 11.25 m^{2} (121.1 sq ft) and mounts full-span ailerons with spades to lighten control forces, which give a roll rate of 450° per second. The standard engine employed is the 315 hp (235 kW) Lycoming IO-580 four-stroke powerplant. The aircraft has an empty weight of 570 kg (1,260 lb) and a gross weight of 850 kg (1,870 lb) for aerobatics and a gross weight of 999 kg (2,202 lb) for non-aerobatic flight.

The 300 was later developed into a two-seat version, the XtremeAir Sbach 342, which was introduced in 2007.

== Operational history ==
The Sbach 300 was flown to a German national aerobatic championship in the unlimited class. Seven XA41s were completed by XtremeAir by 2020, with an additional example completed from a kit. Another XA41, powered by a 360 hp (270 kW) Vedeneyev M14P was completed with the name Angry Fish.

== Specifications (Sbach 300) ==
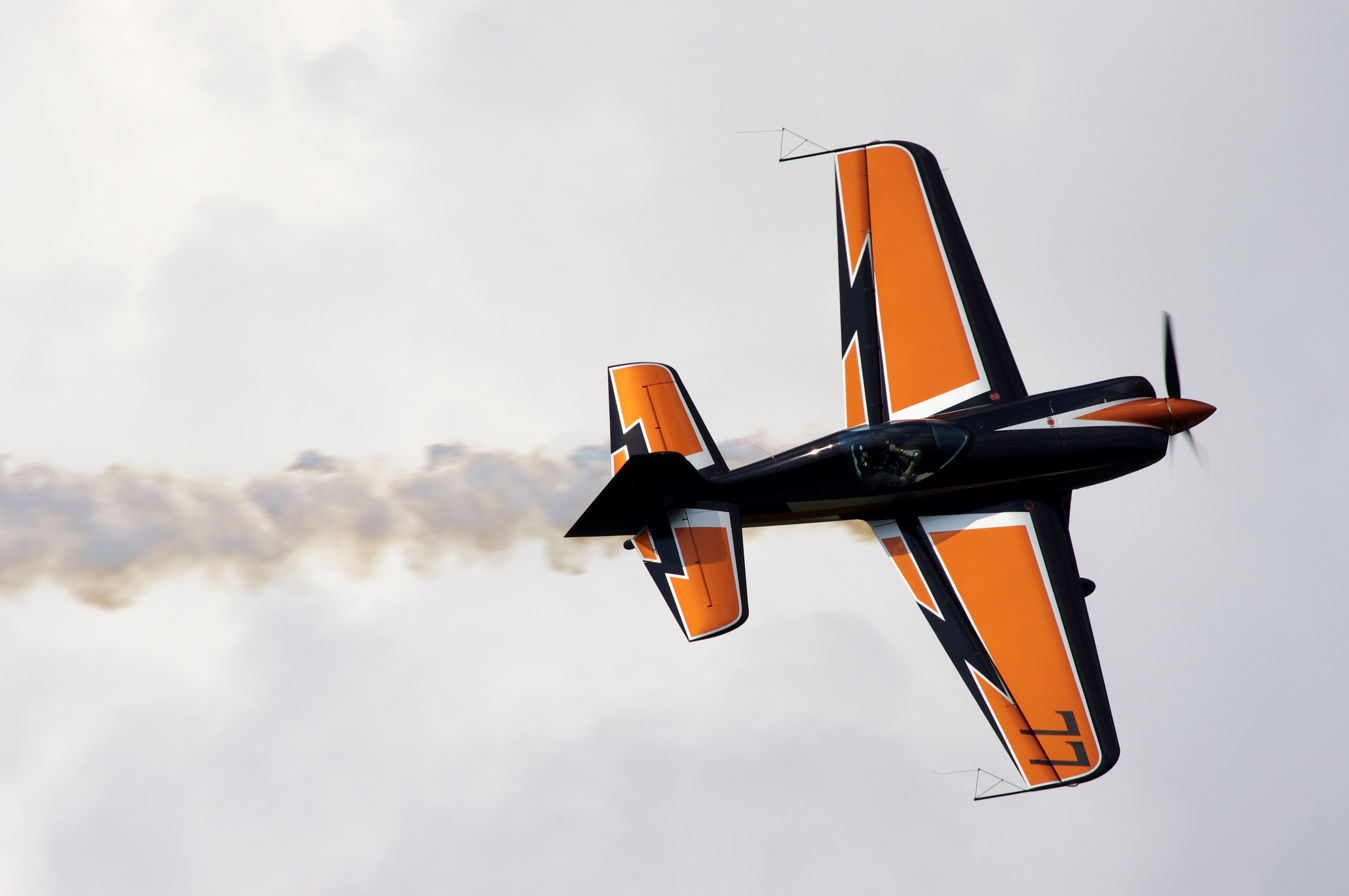
XtremeAir XA-41

Data from Bayerl and XtremeAir

General characteristics

- Crew: one
- Length: 6.30 m (20 ft 8 in)
- Wingspan: 7.50 m (24 ft 7 in)
- Height: 2.3 m (7 ft 7 in) in three-point attitude
- Wing area: 11.25 m^{2} (121.1 sq ft)
- Aspect ratio: 5:1
- Empty weight: 570 kg (1,257 lb)
- Gross weight: 850 kg (1,874 lb) for aerobatics
- Fuel capacity: 245 litres (54 imp gal; 65 US gal)
- Powerplant: 1 × Lycoming IO-580 six cylinder, air-cooled, four stroke aircraft engine, 235 kW (315 hp)
- Propellers: 3-bladed constant speed

Performance

- Maximum speed: 390 km/h (240 mph, 210 kn)
- Cruise speed: 345 km/h (214 mph, 186 kn)
- Stall speed: 94 km/h (58 mph, 51 kn)
- Never exceed speed: 417 km/h (259 mph, 225 kn)
- Range: 1,500 km (920 mi, 800 nmi)
- g limits: +/-10
- Rate of climb: 20.7 m/s (4,070 ft/min)
- Wing loading: 57.8 kg/m^{2} (11.8 lb/sq ft) for aerobatics

== See also ==
- List of aerobatic aircraft
