= Found FBA-2 =

1960s Canadian cabin monoplane

FBA-2
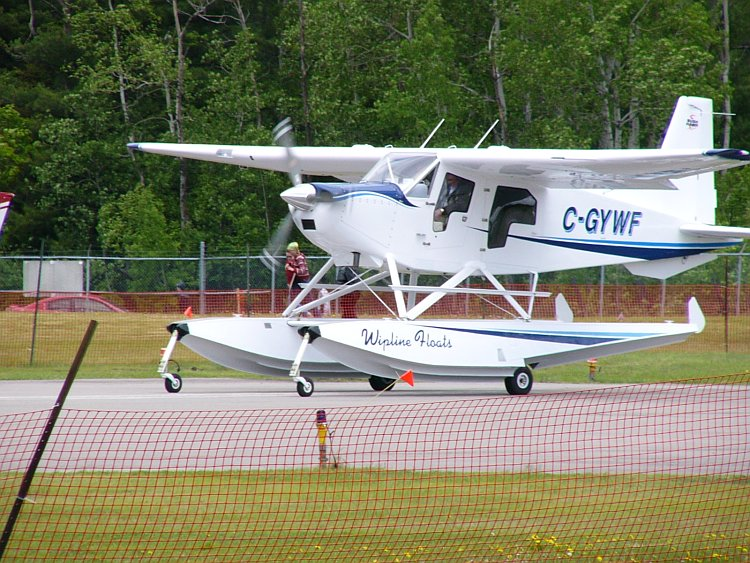
- Found Aircraft FBA-2C1 BushHawk

General information
- Type: Cabin monoplane
- National origin: Canada
- Manufacturer: Found Aircraft
- Designer: S.R. Found
- Status: Production completed
- Number built: 68

History
- First flight: 11 August 1960
- Developed from: Found FBA-1
- Variant: Found Centennial

The Found FBA-2 is a 1960s Canadian four/five-seat cabin monoplane that was produced by Found Aircraft.

== Design and development ==
The Found FBA-2 is an all-metal development of the company's first design, the Found FBA-1. The prototype aircraft, the FBA-2A, first flew on 11 August 1960. It is a high-wing monoplane with a fixed tricycle undercarriage. The production version was to be the Found FBA-2B but the aircraft was produced with a conventional tail-wheel landing gear as the Found FBA-2C. The first production FBA-2C first flew on 9 May 1962. It is powered by an Avco Lycoming O-540-A1D engine and had a slightly longer cabin and enlarged cabin doors than the prototype. Originally, float or ski landing gear was available through third parties, and later became a factory option. Production ended in 1965 to concentrate on building the newer and larger Centennial 100. Thirty-four had been built.

=== Bush Hawk-XP ===
In 1996 the design was acquired by Found Aircraft Development who developed an improved model the FBA-2C2 Bush Hawk-XP. This model was certified by Transport Canada in March, 1999 and by the Federal Aviation Administration in March, 2000. This version was manufactured between 2000-2007, after which it was replaced by a new version of the same basic airframe designated the Expedition E350 and the Expedition E350XC.

=== Expedition E350 ===
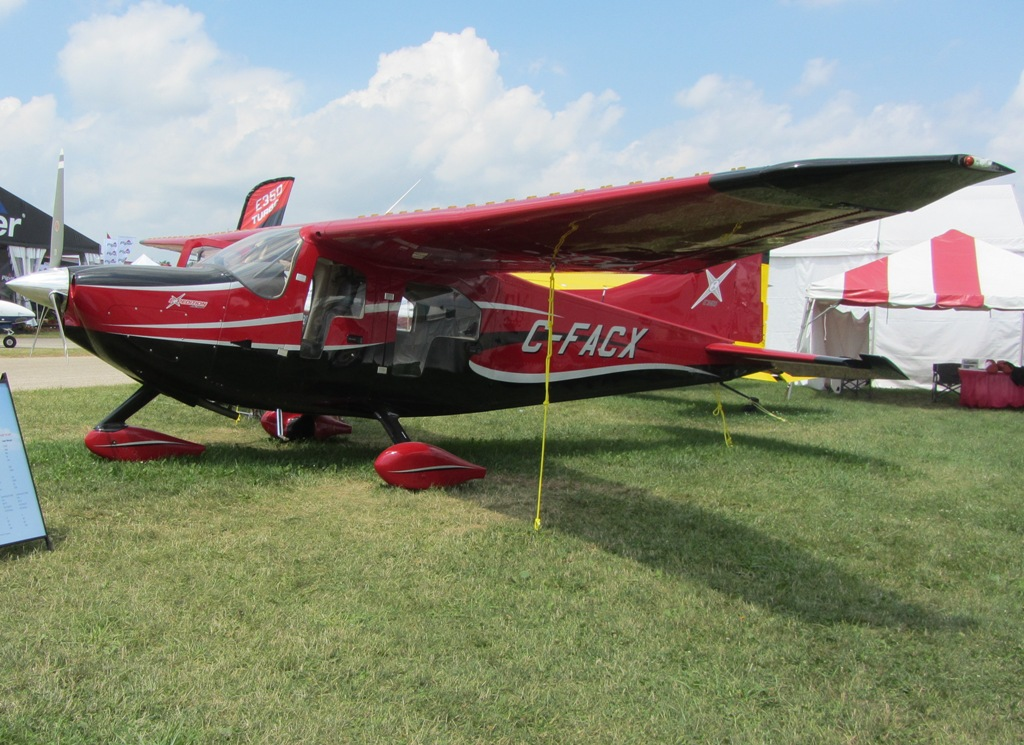
Expedition E350

The E350 is an evolutionary development of the basic FBA-2 aimed at the personal use market. The Expedition E350 was FAA type certified in December 2008. The aircraft can be equipped with four or five seats and has a full fuel payload in excess of 900 pounds. It has a range of 700 nmi (1,296 km) at a cruise speed of 156 kn (289 km/h) and is powered by a Lycoming IO-580 powerplant producing 315 hp (235 kW). The E350 has been designed with rugged landing gear for operating from unprepared surfaces and has STOL performance.

Pacific Aerospace acquired the E-350 program in early 2016 from Found Aircraft. In September 2016, the E-350 Expedition tooling was shipped to its Hamilton, New Zealand plant. Pacific Aerospace planned to relaunch production of the five-seat type in the first half of 2017, but this date was not achieved. It is also planned to produce the E-350 in its joint venture plant in China with Beijing General Aviation Company. The joint venture will be known as Beijing Pan-Pacific Aerospace Technology.

== Variants ==
FBA-2
Prototype, one built.
FBA-2C
Initial production variant, 26 built.
FBA-2C1 Bush Hawk 300
Improved variant with a 300hp Lycoming IO-540L, one built.
FBA-2C1 Bush Hawk XP
Production variant of the Bush Hawk 300, 31 built.
FBA-2C2 Bush Hawk 300XP
Minor changes, 6 built.
FBA-2C3 Expedition E350
Tricycle landing gear first flown in 2006, 3 built.
FBA-2C4 Expedition E350XC
Tail-wheel, one built.
FBA-2D
Proposed variant powered by a 290hp Lycoming engine, not built.

== Specifications (FBA-2C) ==
Data from Jane's All The World's Aircraft 1965-66

General characteristics

- Crew: 1
- Capacity: 4 passengers
- Length: 26 ft 5 in (8.05 m)
- Wingspan: 36 ft 0 in (10.97 m)
- Height: 8 ft 4 in (2.54 m)
- Wing area: 180 sq ft (17 m^{2})
- Empty weight: 1,550 lb (703 kg)
- Max takeoff weight: 2,950 lb (1,338 kg)
- Fuel capacity: 56 imp gal (67 US gal; 250 L)
- Powerplant: 1 × Avco Lycoming O-540-A1D air-cooled flat-six engine, 250 hp (190 kW)
- Propellers: 2-bladed Hartzell constant-speed, 7 ft 4 in (2.24 m) diameter

Performance

- Maximum speed: 147 mph (237 km/h, 128 kn) at sea level
- Cruise speed: 129 mph (208 km/h, 112 kn) at 5,000 ft (1,500 m) (econ cruise, 60% power)
- Stall speed: 48 mph (77 km/h, 42 kn) (power off, 35 degree flaps)
- Range: 610 mi (980 km, 530 nmi)
- Service ceiling: 16,000 ft (4,900 m)
- Rate of climb: 1,100 ft/min (5.6 m/s)
