= XIX GmbH =

Swiss aircraft manufacturer

- Company type: Gesellschaft mit beschränkter Haftung
- Industry: Aerospace
- Founded: prior to 1998
- Defunct: circa 2009
- Headquarters: Kronbühl, Switzerland
- Key people: Michi Kobler
- Products: Paragliders

XIX GmbH was a Swiss aircraft manufacturer based in Kronbühl .The company was founded by Michi Kobler. It specialized in the design and manufacture of paragliders in the form of ready-to-fly aircraft.

The company seems to have been founded before 1998 and gone out of business in about 2009.

It was organized as a Gesellschaft mit beschränkter Haftung, a Swiss limited liability company.

In 2003, the company had a wide range of paragliders in their line, including the beginner Smile, the beginner to intermediate Art, the intermediate Form and Inter, the performance Top and the Sens competition wing series.

== Aircraft ==
Summary of aircraft built by XIX:

- XIX Art
- XIX Form
- XIX Inter
- XIX Sens
- XIX Smile
- XIX Top
