= Xplorer UltraFlight =

South African aircraft manufacturer

- Type: Privately held company
- Industry: Aerospace
- Founder: Keith Pickersgill
- Headquarters: Cape Town, South Africa
- Products: Paramotors
- Services: Flight training
- Website: www.xplorer.co.za

Xplorer UltraFlight is a South African aircraft manufacturer based in Cape Town and founded by Keith Pickersgill. The company specializes in the design and manufacture of paramotors in the form of ready-to-fly aircraft for the US FAR 103 Ultralight Vehicles rules and the European Fédération Aéronautique Internationale microlight category. The company also provides paramotor flight training.

The company has produced a number of paramotor designs. In the mid-2000s these included the Xflyer and the XS, both powered by the Solo 210 engine. In 2016, the company was producing the Micro80, powered by the Italian Per Il Volo Top 80 motor and also acted as a dealer for the Spanish Marbella Parapente Paramotor PAP line.

== Aircraft ==
Summary of aircraft built by Xplorer UltraFlight
Model name	First flight	Number built	Type
Xplorer Xflyer	mid-2000s		paramotor
Xplorer XS	mid-2000s		paramotor
Xplorer Micro80	mid-2010s		paramotor
