= XtremeAir Sbach 342 =

German aerobatic aeroplane

Sbach 342 (XA42)
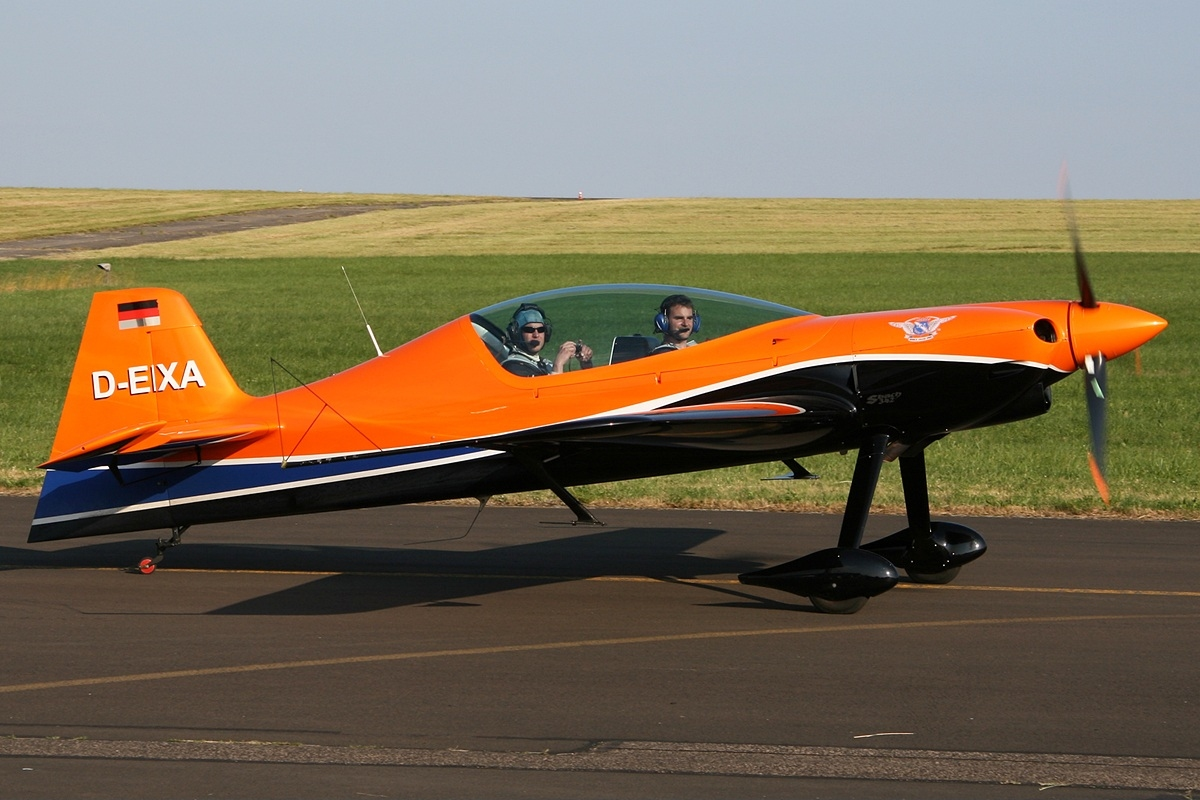
- On Bitburg Airport, Germany, 2010.

General information
- Type: Aerobatic monoplane
- National origin: Germany
- Manufacturer: XtremeAir GmbH
- Number built: 60+

History
- Developed from: XtremeAir Sbach 300

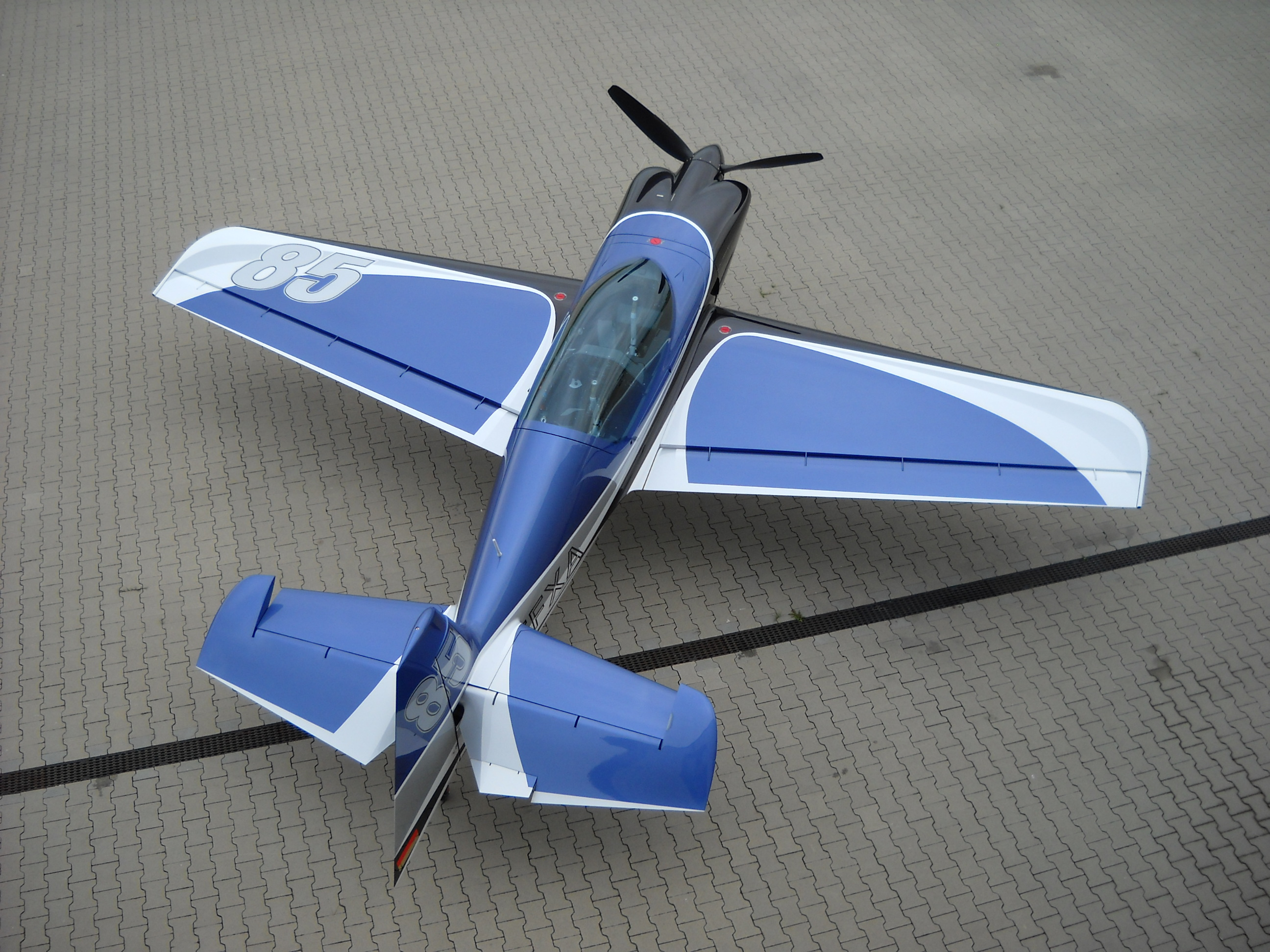
In front of XtremeAir GmbH, 2010

The XtremeAir Sbach 342 (XA42) is a German high performance two-seat aerobatic and touring monoplane designed by Philipp Steinbach with Albert Mylius and built by XtremeAir GmbH of Hecklingen.

The Sbach 342 (a marketing name for the XA42) is a composite structure low-wing monoplane with a fixed conventional landing gear with a tailwheel and carbon fiber fuselage. It is powered by a 315 hp (235 kW) Lycoming AEIO-580-B1A piston engine driving a three-bladed propeller. It is the tandem version of the single-seater XA 41 (XtremeAir Sbach 300) which was designed by the same team in Speyer in 2004. The XA42 received a type certificate from the European Aviation Safety Agency in March 2011. In November 2012 it received its type certification through the FAA.

== Specifications (acrobatic) ==
Data from Type Certificate Data Sheet,Airplane Flight Manual

General characteristics

- Crew: 1
- Capacity: 2
- Length: 6.67 m (21 ft 11 in)
- Wingspan: 7.5 m (24 ft 7 in)
- Height: 2.54 m (8 ft 4 in)
- Wing area: 11.25 m^{2} (121.1 sq ft)
- Airfoil: PS-1-16 (wing), PS-1-09 (wing tip), DU86-MOD1 (horizontal tail including elevator and vertical tail including rudder)
- Empty weight: 670 kg (1,477 lb)
- Gross weight: 850 kg (1,874 lb) for acrobatic flight, 999 kg (2,200 lb) for utility flight
- Fuel capacity: 275 L (72.6 US gal) total, 273 L (72.1 US gal) usable, 64 L (16.9 US gal) usable for aerobatics
- Powerplant: 1 × Lycoming AEIO-580-B1A horizontally-opposed six-cylinder four stroke piston engine, 235 kW (315 hp) at 2,700 rpm
- Propellers: 3-bladed MT-Propeller MTV-9-B-C/C203-20d, 2.03 m (6 ft 8 in) diameter ± 5 mm

Performance

- Maximum speed: 417 km/h (259 mph, 225 kn)
- Cruise speed: 343 km/h (213 mph, 185 kn)
- Stall speed: 100 km/h (62 mph, 54 kn)
- Never exceed speed: 417 km/h (259 mph, 225 kn)
- Range: 1,296 km (806 mi, 700 nmi) at 73% power and 4,000 ft with 60 min reserve
- Ferry range: 1,945 km (1,208 mi, 1,050 nmi) at 50% power at 10,000 ft with 60 min reserve
- Service ceiling: 4,572 m (15,000 ft)
- g limits: ± 10
- Roll rate: 450 °/sec
- Maximum glide ratio: 1:7
- Rate of climb: 16.59 m/s (3,266 ft/min) in acrobatic flight, 13.82 m/s (2,720 ft/min) in utility flight
- Wing loading: 75.5 kg/m^{2} (15.5 lb/sq ft) in acrobatic flight, 84.4 kg/m^{2} (17.3 lb/sq ft)
- Power/mass: 276 W/kg (0.17 hp/lb) in acrobatic configuration, 235 W/kg (0.14 hp/lb) in utility configuration
- Fuel flow: 57 L/h (15.1 US gal/h)
