= Lycoming IO-580 =

1997 six-cylinder airplane engine

IO-580
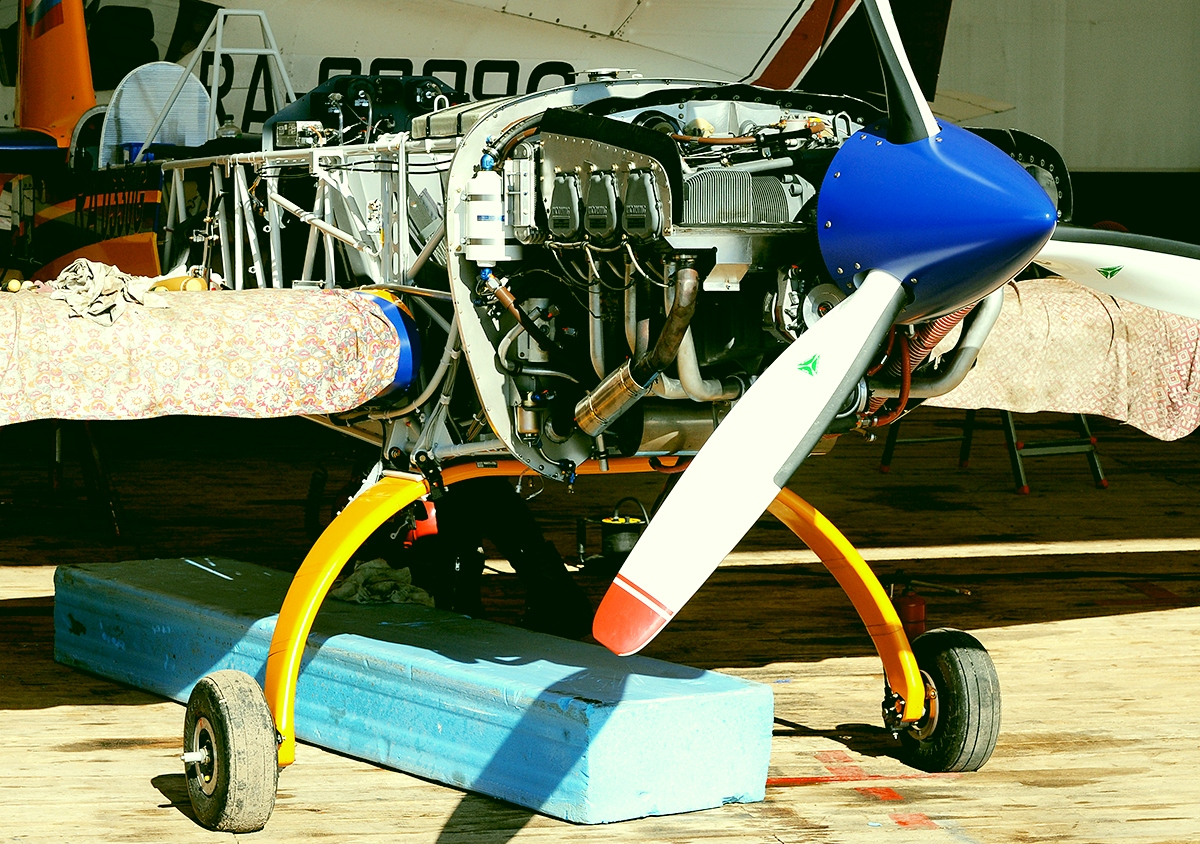
- Lycoming AEIO-580 installed in an Extra 330LC
- Type: Piston aero engine
- National origin: United States
- Manufacturer: Lycoming Engines
- First run: 1996
- Major applications: Extra 330; Expedition E350; XtremeAir Sbach 342
- Manufactured: 1997–present
- Developed into: Lycoming IO-390

The Lycoming IO-580 engine is a horizontally opposed, six-cylinder aircraft engine featuring three cylinders per side, manufactured by Lycoming Engines.

There is no carburetted version of the engine, which would have been designated O-580 and therefore the base model is the IO-580.

This engine family competes with the Continental IO-550 series which are also six-cylinder engines with similar power output and weight.

== Design and development ==
The IO-580 had originally been developed at the behest of Cessna, who were looking for a modern engine to power their Cessna 206 Stationair. Development was slow, and the aircraft was delayed to wait for the engine. When production began, Cessna found problems with the cylinders, and instead of further delaying the introduction, they moved the 206 to the older and less powerful 260 hp Lycoming IO-540. Lycoming eventually addressed all of the problems, and the engine found some use in various aerobatic aircraft, but no serious production was undertaken.

The IO-580 family of engines covers a range from 300 to 315 hp (224 to 235 kW). The engine has a fuel injection system which meters fuel in proportion to the induction airflow through air-bled nozzles at the individual cylinder intake ports. The engine has a displacement of 583 cubic inches (9.554 litres) and produces a maximum of 315 hp (235 kW) in its B1A version. The cylinders have air-cooled heads cast from aluminum-alloy with a fully machined combustion chamber.

The first IO-580 was type certified on 12 August 1997 on the regulatory basis of FAR 33 effective February 1, 1965 as amended to 33-1 through 33-18. The engine is certified for use in either tractor or pusher configuration installations.

== Variants ==
IO-580-A1A
Six-cylinder, horizontally opposed, air-cooled direct drive, 583 cubic inches (9.55 litres), 300 hp (224 kW) at 2500 rpm, dry weight 444 lb (201 kg), PAC-RSA-10ED1 fuel-injection system, certified 12 August 1997
IO-580-B1A
Six-cylinder, horizontally opposed, air-cooled direct drive, 583 cubic inches (9.55 litres), 315 hp (235 kW) at 2700 rpm, dry weight 434 lb (197 kg), PAC-RSA-10ED1 fuel-injection system, certified 23 March 2001
AEIO-580-B1A
Six-cylinder, horizontally opposed, air-cooled direct drive, 583 cubic inches (9.55 litres), 315 hp (235 kW) at 2700 rpm, dry weight 446 lb (202 kg), certified 13 August 2007. This model has an aerobatic fuel and oil system. It may be equipped with either the PAC-RSA-10ED1 fuel-injection system or a Lycoming FM-250 system.

== Applications ==
- Bearhawk 5
- Cessna NGP
- MSW Votec 252T
- Rockwell Super Commander

IO-580-B1A

- Expedition E350 - factory installation
- Evektor VUT100-131i SuperCobra

AEIO-580-B1A

- Extra 330
- Extra NG
- Game Composites GB1 GameBird
- XtremeAir Sbach 342 (XA 42)
- XtremeAir XA41

== Specifications (IO-580-A1A) ==
Data from Lycoming Specialty Datasheet and Type Certificate Data Sheet No. E00004NY, Revision 1.

=== General characteristics ===
- Type: 6-cylinder fuel-injected horizontally opposed aircraft engine
- Bore: 5.319 in (135.1 mm)
- Stroke: 4.375 in (111.1 mm)
- Displacement: 583 in^{3} (9.55 L)
- Length: 39.34 in (999 mm)
- Width: 34.25 in (870 mm)
- Height: 21.04 in (534 mm)
- Dry weight: 444 lb (201 kg) dry

=== Components ===
- Fuel system: PAC-RSA-10ED1 fuel-injection
- Fuel type: 100LL avgas
- Cooling system: air-cooled

=== Performance ===
- Power output: 300 hp (220 kW) at 2500 rpm
- Specific power: 0.51 hp/in³ (24.7 kW/L)
- Compression ratio: 8.90:1
- Power-to-weight ratio: 0.68 hp/lb (1.12 kW/kg)

== See also ==
Related development

- Lycoming GSO-580

Comparable engines

- Continental IO-550

Related lists

- List of aircraft engines
