= Magdeburg–Cochstedt Airport =

Magdeburg – Cochstedt Airport Flughafen Magdeburg – Cochstedt

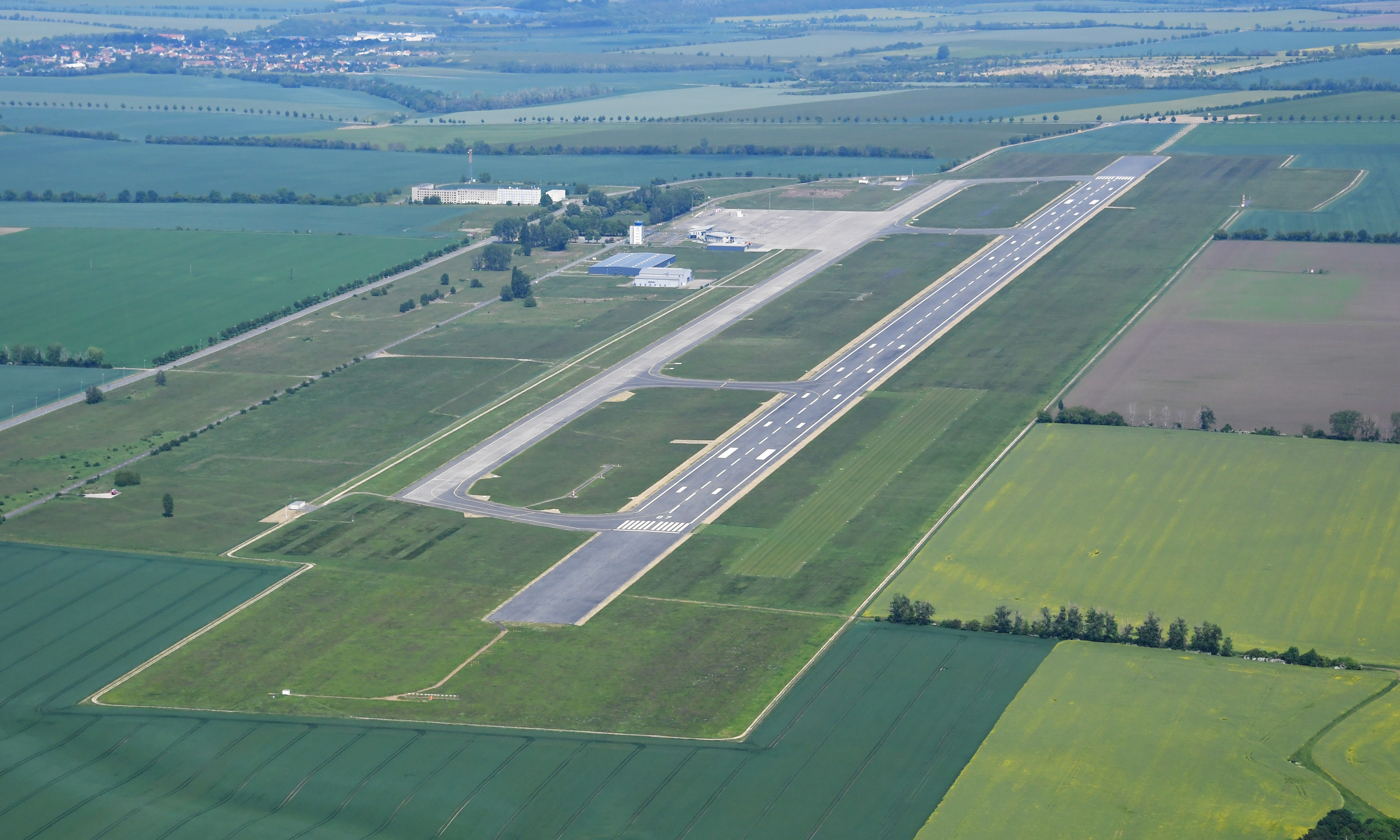
- IATA: CSO; ICAO: EDBC

Summary
- Airport type: Public
- Operator: Flughafen Magdeburg-Cochstedt Betriebsgesellschaft mbH
- Serves: Magdeburg, Germany
- Location: Cochstedt
- Elevation AMSL: 601 ft / 183 m
- Coordinates: 51°51′21″N 011°25′06″E
- Website: Official website

Map
- Location of airport in Saxony-Anhalt CSO (Germany) CSO (Europe)

Runways
Direction	Length		Surface
Direction	m	ft	Surface
26/08	2,500	8,202	Asphalt
- Sources: AIP at German air traffic control., cochstedt-airport.de

Magdeburg–Cochstedt Airport (IATA: CSO, ICAO: EDBC) is a minor unscheduled airport located in Cochstedt, Germany. It is located approximately 37 km (23 mi) southwest of Magdeburg, capital of the Bundesland Saxony-Anhalt, and about 190 km (118 miles) west from the center of Berlin. As of 1 September 2016, the airport had been closed by the authorities. In 2019 it was sold as a testing facility to the German Aerospace Center and since 2022, flight operations for small aircraft have started again.

== History ==
=== Early years ===
The airport Cochstedt dates from the year 1957, when an air force base of the Soviet troops was established. In 1968, the runway extension was completed and airport logistics operation expanded. After the German reunification and the withdrawal of Soviet troops, the first steps for continued existence as a civil airport were taken.

On 26 May 1994 the airport was given an operating license as a commercial airport with class D airspace and full day and night operation. From November 1997 until early 1999 the operations were suspended due to a complete refurbishment of the airport, including runway, apron, taxiways, control tower.

=== Development in the 2000s ===
In June 2000, an instrument landing system (ILS) Category I and a high-performance approach lights were put into operation allowing the operation under instrument flying rules. In the summer of 2001 a new fire station was put into operation and the construction of a new terminal building for the General Aviation ("GAT") started. However, before works were completed, on 31 December 2001 operation was suspended due to insolvency of the airport operator.

On behalf of the state of Saxony-Anhalt GSA acquired all assets from the bankrupt estate. The new operating company FMC mbH was founded in 2005 jointly with the Landkreis Aschersleben-Staßfurt. On 4 March 2010 the airport was acquired by the Danish company Development A/S.

On 31 August 2016, the state authorities revoked the airport's operational license for instrumental approaches and therefore de facto closing it until further notice from 1 September 2016. It was stated that the airport failed to provide required documentation needed to keep the license.

In 2019, the German Aerospace Center purchased the entire airport to establish a testing facility for drones and helicopters. Since 2022, flight operations for small aircraft have started again.

== Airlines and destinations ==
Ryanair operated summer seasonal flights out of Magdeburg–Cochstedt from 2011 to 2013, the last remaining destinations served being Girona and Palma de Mallorca. In December 2013 Ryanair announced the cancellation of these routes, leaving the airport without any scheduled flights. The airport was however used for few occasional leisure charter services once or twice per month after that.

== Ground transportation ==
The airport can be reached via federal highway B180. Magdeburg can be reached within 40 minutes. There are currently no public scheduled transportation services.

== See also ==
- Transport in Germany
- List of airports in Germany
