= Raptor Aircraft Raptor =

Homebuilt aircraft

Raptor
- Prototype Raptor

General information
- Type: Homebuilt aircraft
- National origin: United States/Australia
- Manufacturer: Raptor Aircraft
- Designer: Peter Muller
- Status: Development ended
- Number built: one prototype

History
- First flight: 10 October 2020

The Raptor was a four to five-seat single-engined canard-wing homebuilt light aircraft, whose prototype was under development by Raptor Aircraft of Ball Ground, Georgia, United States. The Raptor's tricycle landing gear was fully retractable, and the streamlined pressurized airframe was to be optimized for a fast cruising speed at high altitudes. The aircraft was intended to be supplied in kit form for amateur construction.

The aircraft's designer is Australian Peter Muller, whose design goals were to provide a fast, spacious aircraft with IFR capability. Muller intended that the kit would be sold "at cost".

The prototype made its first substantive flight on 10 October 2020.

During a ferry flight on 6 August 2021 the Raptor prototype crashed in a cornfield, suffering substantial damage. Subsequently, Muller announced that development of the Raptor would end and the company would move onto developing a derivative design, the Raptor Aircraft Raptor NG.

== Design and development ==
The Raptor was a canard design whose main wings have no flaps, a feature which may extend landing and take-off distances, but whose reduced drag may allow higher speeds and reduced fuel consumption. Instead of a fuselage-mounted fin and rudder, each main wing has a winglet and rudder. The tricycle landing gear is fully retractable. The aircraft has been designed using CAD techniques, and was constructed primarily of carbon fibre, glass fibre and epoxy. The design was conducted to satisfy the area rule, however the aircraft will not travel at high enough speeds for the area rule to be of any benefit. The Raptor is to be powered by an Audi 3.0 TDI automotive conversion driving a constant-speed pusher propeller and giving a design cruise speed of 300 kn (556 km/h).

The company made a point of favourably comparing their aircraft against the Cirrus SR22, which has been the world's best-selling general aviation airplane every year since 2002. Raptor Aircraft claim that its plane, compared to the SR22, will be roomier, with a much higher speed, much lower drag, much better economy, and a much lower purchase price. The "finished and flying" price, including engine, is intended to be under US$130,000, with an intention to bring that below $100,000. Prospective buyers made a $2,000 deposit, held in escrow. By December 2018, 1,500 deposits had been received and the company had stopped taking further deposits. The company does not advertise conventionally; rather it posts regular video bulletins on YouTube to illustrate progress to interested parties.

The company proposed that the Raptor would be suitable as a new air taxi aircraft and for light cargo services and they plan on partnering with a company such as Uber. Also, they proposed that a turboprop version would become available in due course. The company claimed they would be "Changing General Aviation in a Big Way", saying:

"We are offering a completed Raptor 'At Cost' and Open Sourcing the whole program so universities and businesses will be able to have access to the design and make improvements and modifications in the same way that open source works in the software world. We will be opening the parts and airframe construction, support and flight training so companies world-wide can compete for your business thereby keeping availability high and prices low. This will also ensure that there is no single point of failure for parts, airframes or support. This distributed model will eliminate any chance of the Raptor not having support. Much like the internet, the open and distributed nature makes it virtually impossible to destroy. The competition will have a difficult time trying to stop us."

In an August 2019 video the prototype was weighed at an empty weight of 3,144 lb (1,426 kg), which is 1,344 lb (610 kg) heavier than originally estimated. At a gross weight of 3,800 lb (1,724 kg) the aircraft's useful load is 656 lb (298 kg). With full fuel of 121 U.S. gallons (460 L; 101 imp gal) the payload is −70 lb (−32 kg).

=== Flight tests ===
The prototype made a short hop on 21 July 2020, during which it took longer to reach take-off speed than expected and cameras revealed the main landing gear legs exhibited a shimmy on landing. Flight testing took place after those issues were addressed.

The first real flight took place on 10 October 2020 at Valdosta Regional Airport. The aircraft experienced oscillations in yaw and pitch. Also, oil and coolant temperatures were quite high, and climb rate was less than expected, so Muller landed on runway 04 before completing a full circuit. Muller felt that the issues could be caused by not having raised the landing gear, which increased drag and not having the coolant air intake fully open.

On 4 February 2021 during a test flight, the Raptor experienced an oil leak followed by an engine failure caused by an out of position oil seal. The aircraft was glided to an uneventful landing with minor damage from runway contact by one wing tip. During post event testing it was discovered that the #2 cylinder wrist pin had failed as well and an engine swap was required.

On 6 August 2021, the aircraft suffered an engine failure and was substantially damaged in the subsequent crash in a corn field Nebraska. Designer and pilot, Peter Muller was unharmed in the incident.

=== Raptor NG ===
After the crash of the prototype, Muller announced that he was ending development of the Raptor and moving onto development of the Raptor Aircraft Raptor NG. The now unpressurized NG would use a similar fuselage design (but two inches larger in all three dimensions). The Raptor NG would have a shorter box wing design, along with twin electric motors driving ducted fans. The design has been further developed to have a third ducted fan on a vertical axis in the nose, with both main engines able to pivot back 90° to provide upwards thrust and VTOL ability. Some online commentators have, while wishing the project well, reckoned this VTOL plan to be "a bridge too far" and unrealistic for a small firm to achieve. A 2023 detailed technical analysis entitled "Raptor NG VTOL Reality or Renderware?" comprehensively disparages the NG concept as being so mathematically unsound that none of its design targets are achievable.

== Specifications (projected) ==
Data from the manufacturer

General characteristics

- Crew: one
- Capacity: three-four passengers
- Length: 22 ft 2 in (6.76 m)
- Wingspan: 33 ft 9 in (10.29 m)
- Height: 10 ft 0 in (3.05 m)
- Wing area: 167 sq ft (15.5 m^{2})
- Empty weight: 3,144 lb (1,426 kg)
- Gross weight: 3,800 lb (1,724 kg)
- Fuel capacity: 124 U.S. gallons (470 L; 103 imp gal) usable
- Powerplant: 1 × Audi 3.0L TDI V6 turbocharged diesel engine , 300 hp (220 kW)

Performance

- Cruise speed: 300 kn (350 mph, 560 km/h) at 25,000 feet
- Stall speed: 65 kn (75 mph, 120 km/h)
- Range: 3,600 nmi (4,100 mi, 6,700 km)
- Service ceiling: 27,000 ft (8,200 m)
- Rate of climb: 2,000 ft/min (10 m/s) solo
- Wing loading: 21.5 lb/sq ft (105 kg/m^{2})

== See also ==
- Berkut 360
- Cozy III
- Glassic SQ2000
- Pusher configuration
- Rutan Defiant
- Rutan Long-EZ
- Rutan VariEze
- Steve Wright Stagger-Ez
- Synergy Aircraft Synergy
- Velocity SE
- Velocity XL
