= Cozy III =

Type of aircraft

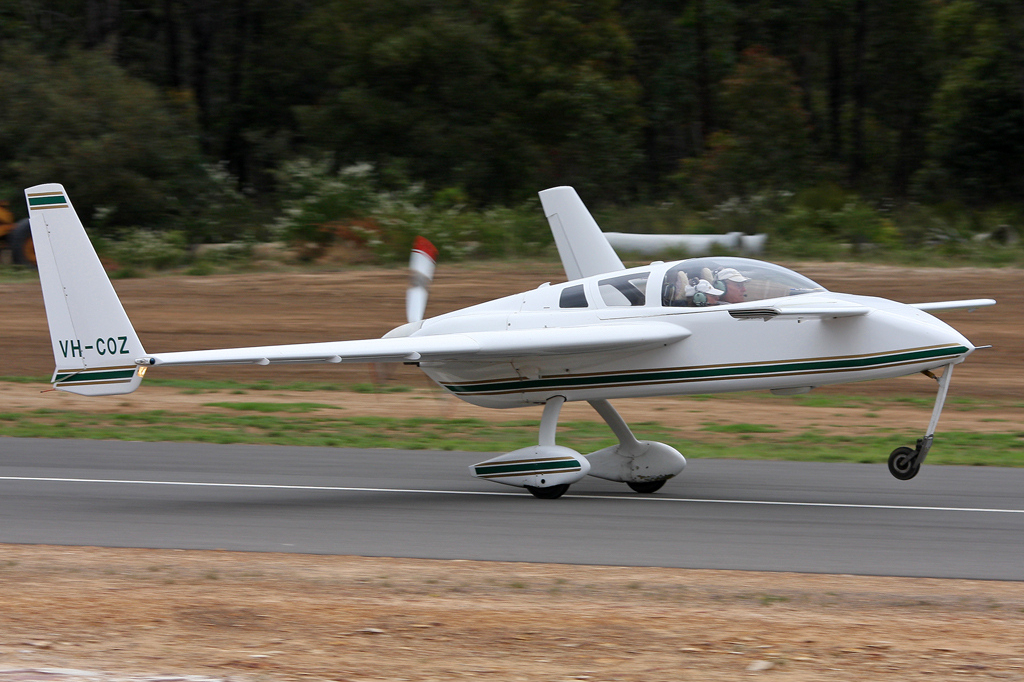
- Cozy MK III

General information
- Type: Homebuilt aircraft
- National origin: United States
- Manufacturer: Co-Z Development Company
- Designer: Nat Puffer

History
- Introduction date: 1982
- First flight: 1982
- Developed from: Rutan Long-EZ

The Cozy III is a 3-seat, single engine, homebuilt light aircraft designed by Nat Puffer. The aircraft is built from plans using basic raw materials. It is not a kit aircraft, though many small parts are available prefabricated. The Cozy is similar in design and construction to the 2-seat Rutan Long-EZ, from which it is derived, with approval from Burt Rutan.

The Cozy utilizes foam and fiberglass sandwich construction, with foam suited to the usage, fiberglass oriented for the stresses, and epoxy to bond them together.

Nat Puffer designed the aircraft as a high speed cross-country VFR aircraft, although many builders equip their planes with IFR capabilities.

== Design and development ==
The aircraft is constructed primarily of fiberglass, foam, and epoxy. Urethane foam is used to form highly curved, hand-carved shapes such as the nose and wing tips. Blue rigid styrofoam is cut with a hot wire saw to form the wing cores. Thin PVC foam sheets are used to form bulkheads and the fuselage sides. Two types of woven fiberglass are used to provide the surface strength of the composite sandwich. The builder does not need pre-fabricated items to finish the aircraft except for the landing gear bow and nose gear strut which require forms and an oven for post curing, but suppliers exist for these parts, such as Featherlite of Ukiah CA.

The recommended engine is the 120 hp (89 kW) Lycoming O-235, but a variety of powerplants from 160 to 220 hp (119 to 164 kW) have been used.

== Previous Versions and Related Aircraft ==
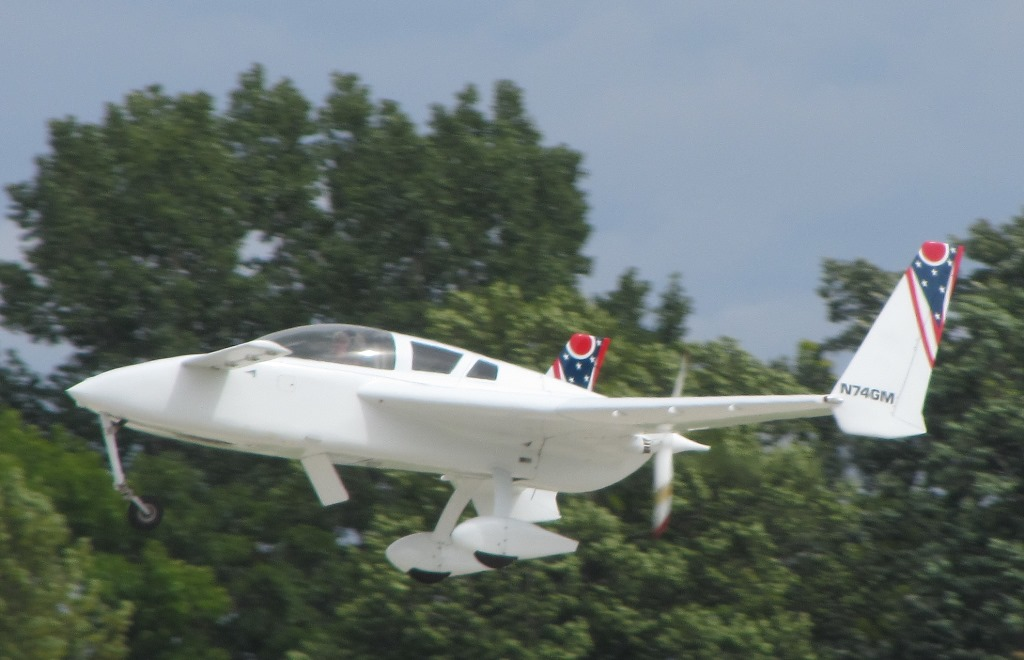
Cozy on Landing

Cozy
Like the Long-EZ, the design includes a retractable nose gear and fixed main gear. With both front seats unoccupied, the center of gravity with the aircraft level is aft of the main gear. Thus, like the Long-EZ, the Cozy is parked with the nose resting on the ground, sometimes called "grazing". The nose-down position is very stable. The aircraft can withstand high winds as the wings are beyond a flying angle of attack. Some Cozy builders modify the design to include retractable main gear. This modification increases the maximum speed by a few knots. Maximum fuel tank capacity is reduced to accommodate the retracted gear.

Cosy Classic
The Cosy Classic is the European version of Cozy III, changed to a forward opening canopy and other modifications. The forward opening canopy design is available from Uli Wolter, the designer of the Cosy Classic modifications.

Cozy IV
The Cozy Mark IV is a 4-seat aircraft and the successor to the 3-seat Cozy III. Also designed by Nat Puffer, the Cozy IV first flew in 1988.

== Specifications (Cozy III) ==
General characteristics

- Crew: one
- Capacity: two passengers
- Length: 16.8 ft (5.1 m)
- Wingspan: 26.1 ft (8.0 m)
- Height: 7.9 ft (2.4 m)
- Wing area: 95.6 sq ft (8.88 m^{2})
- Empty weight: 906 lb (411 kg)
- Gross weight: 1,500 lb (680 kg)
- Powerplant: 1 × Lycoming O-235 four-cylinder, direct-drive, horizontally opposed, air-cooled, piston aircraft engines, 120 hp (89 kW)

Performance

- Cruise speed: 160 kn (180 mph, 290 km/h) @ 75% power
- Range: 1,000 nmi (1,200 mi, 1,900 km) At 75% power
- Service ceiling: 18,000 ft (5,500 m)
- Rate of climb: 800 ft/min (4.1 m/s) gross

1200 ft/min solo

== See also ==
- Rutan Long-EZ
- Rutan VariEze
- Rutan Defiant
- Cozy Mark IV
- Berkut aircraft
- Velocity SE
- Velocity XL
- Steve Wright Stagger-Ez
- Canard
- Pusher configuration
