= Cozy MK IV =

Light aircraft in the US

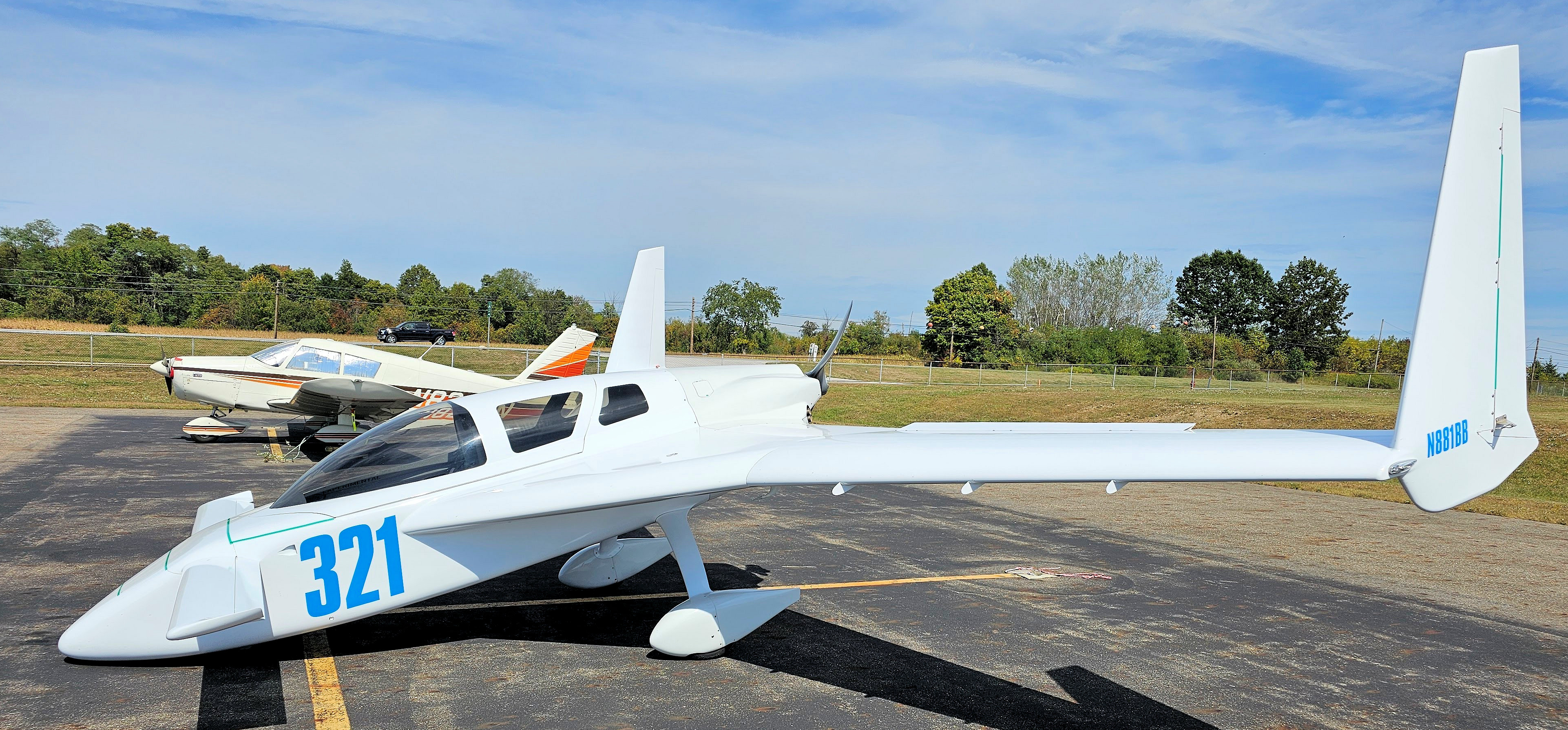
- Cozy MK IV parked with nose gear retracted

General information
- Type: Homebuilt aircraft
- National origin: United States
- Manufacturer: Aircraft Spruce & Specialty Co
- Designer: Nat Puffer
- Number built: 350 (2015)

History
- Introduction date: 1991
- First flight: 1993
- Developed from: Rutan Long-EZ

The Cozy Mark IV is a 4-seat, single engine, homebuilt light aircraft designed by Nat Puffer, with parts and plans supplied by Aircraft Spruce & Specialty Co. The aircraft is built from plans using basic raw materials. It is not a kit aircraft, though many small parts are available prefabricated. The Cozy is similar in design and construction to the 2-seat Rutan Long-EZ, from which it is derived, with approval from Burt Rutan.

The Cozy Mark IV utilizes foam and fiberglass sandwich construction, with foam suited to the usage, fiberglass oriented for the stresses, and epoxy to bond them together.

Nat Puffer designed the aircraft as a high speed cross-country visual flight rules (VFR) aircraft, although many builders equip their planes with instrument flight rules (IFR) capabilities.

== Features and capabilities ==
The Cozy Mark IV is a canard aircraft, utilizing a canard wing in front and a main wing in the rear. Both wings are lifting surfaces, and the aircraft is designed to be stall-proof, as the canard will stall before the main wing. As designed, the main landing gear are fixed, while the nose gear is retractable, although some builders have chosen to build their aircraft with retractable main gear, and at least one third-party vendor offers such a system. The plans-built Cozy MK IV has a canopy which is hinged on the right side of the fuselage.

The Cozy does not have aerodynamic flaps, but instead utilizes a retractable landing brake on the belly of the aircraft to help slow the aircraft. The Cozy is suited for hard-surfaced runways, and typically requires a longer takeoff and landing roll than equivalent traditional aircraft. It is however far more efficient than traditional aircraft when in flight, achieving high cruise speeds and low fuel consumption.

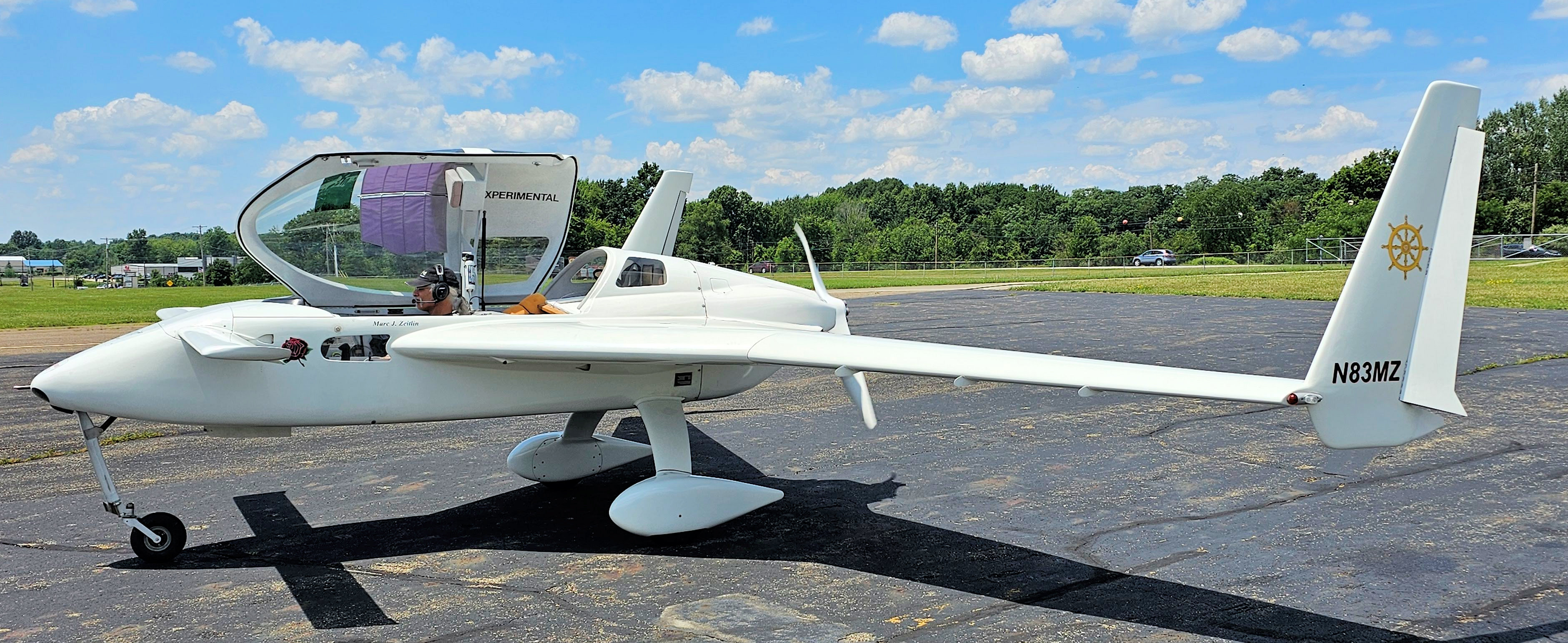
Cozy MKIV with nose gear extended and canopy open

== Design and development ==
The aircraft is constructed primarily of fiberglass, foam, and epoxy. Urethane foam is used to form highly curved, hand-carved shapes such as the nose and wing tips. Blue rigid styrofoam is cut with a hot wire saw to form the wing cores. Thin PVC foam sheets are used to form bulkheads and the fuselage sides. Two types of woven fiberglass are used to provide the surface strength of the composite sandwich. RA7715 fiberglass is almost entirely unidirectional in its fiber orientation. RA7725 has an equal portion of perpendicular fiberglass strands. Epoxy systems used include EZ-Poxy, Safe-T-Poxy, MGS L285 and L335, and West Systems. The builder does not need pre-fabricated items to finish the aircraft except for the landing gear bow and nose gear strut which require forms and an oven for post curing, but several suppliers exist for these parts.

The recommended engine is the 180 hp (134 kW) Lycoming O-360, but a variety of powerplants from 160 to 220 hp (119 to 164 kW) have been used. One installation uses two Suzuki 1600 automobile engines driving two concentric contrarotating propellers.

== Previous versions and related aircraft ==
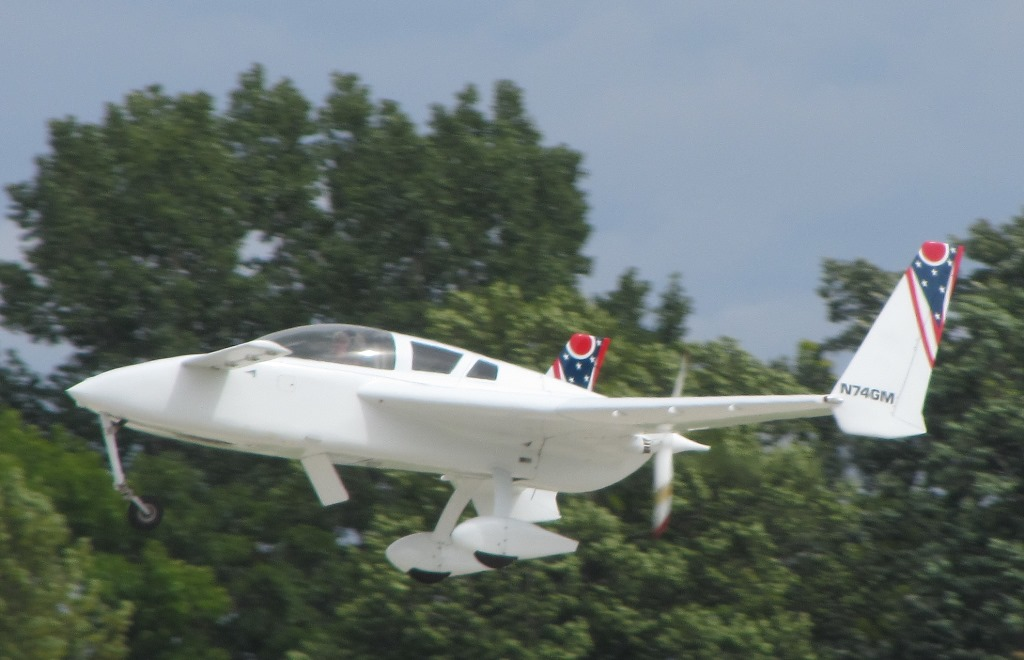
Cozy landing

Cozy
Like the Long-EZ, the design includes a retractable nose gear and fixed main gear. With both front seats unoccupied, the center of gravity with the aircraft level is aft of the main gear. Thus, like the Long-EZ, the Cozy is parked with the nose resting on the ground, sometimes called "grazing". The nose-down position is very stable. The aircraft can withstand high winds as the wings are beyond a flying angle of attack. Some Cozy builders modify the design to include retractable main gear. This modification increases the maximum speed by a few knots. Maximum fuel tank capacity is reduced to accommodate the retracted gear.

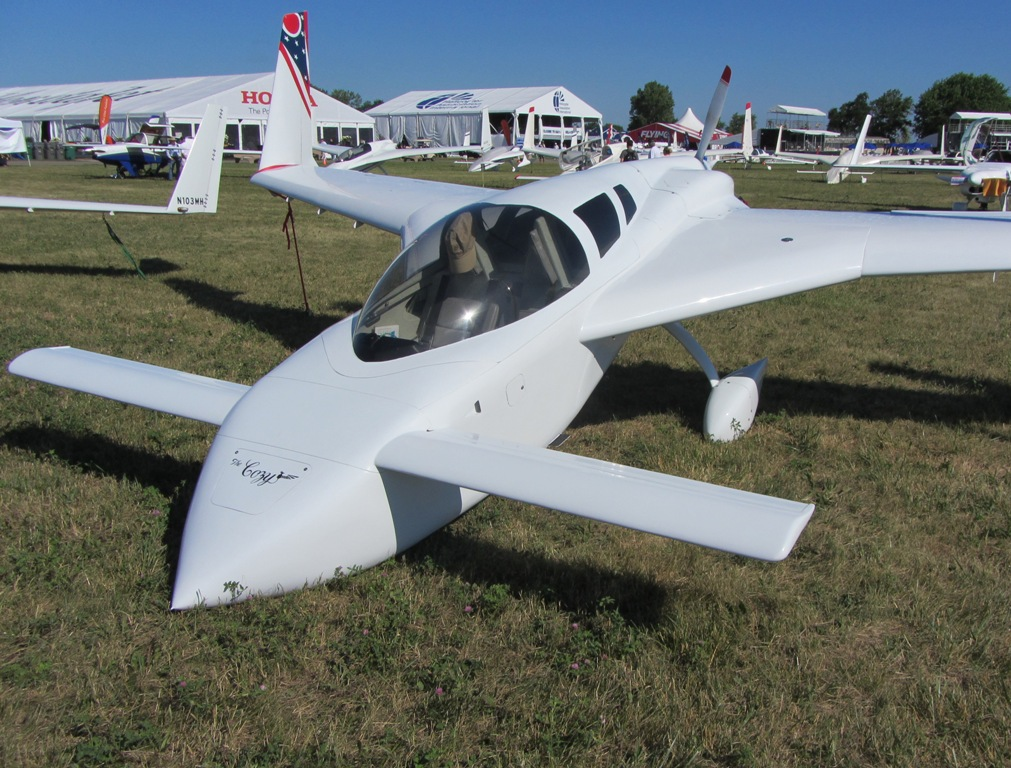
A Cozy III

Cozy III
The Cozy III was a 3-seat aircraft and the predecessor of the 4-seat Cozy Mark IV. Also designed by Nat Puffer, the Cozy III was initially referred to as simply "The Cozy". When the 4-place was announced, the qualification of the Cozy IV name was required.

Cosy Classic
The Cosy Classic is the European version of Cozy III, changed to a forward opening canopy and other modifications. The forward opening canopy design is available from Uli Wolter, the designer of the Cosy Classic modifications.

== Specifications (Cozy MK IV) ==
Data from

General characteristics

- Crew: one
- Capacity: three passengers
- Length: 16 ft 10.8 in (5.151 m)
- Wingspan: 28 ft 1.2 in (8.565 m)
- Height: 7 ft 10.8 in (2.408 m)
- Wing area: 88.3 sq ft (8.20 m^{2})
- Empty weight: 1,050 lb (476 kg)
- Gross weight: 2,050 lb (930 kg)
- Powerplant: 1 × Lycoming O-360 four-cylinder, direct-drive, horizontally opposed, air-cooled, piston aircraft engines, 180 hp (130 kW)

Performance

- Cruise speed: 190 kn (220 mph, 350 km/h) @ 75% power
- Range: 1,300 nmi (1,500 mi, 2,400 km) At 50% power
- Service ceiling: 20,000 ft (6,100 m)
- Rate of climb: 1,200 ft/min (6.1 m/s) gross

2000 ft/min (10.16 m/s) solo

== See also ==
- Berkut 360
- Canard
- Cozy III
- Glassic SQ2000
- Pusher configuration
- Raptor Aircraft Raptor
- Rutan Defiant
- Rutan Long-EZ
- Rutan VariEze
- Steve Wright Stagger-Ez
- Velocity SE
- Velocity XL
