= Velocity XL =

American amateur-built aircraft

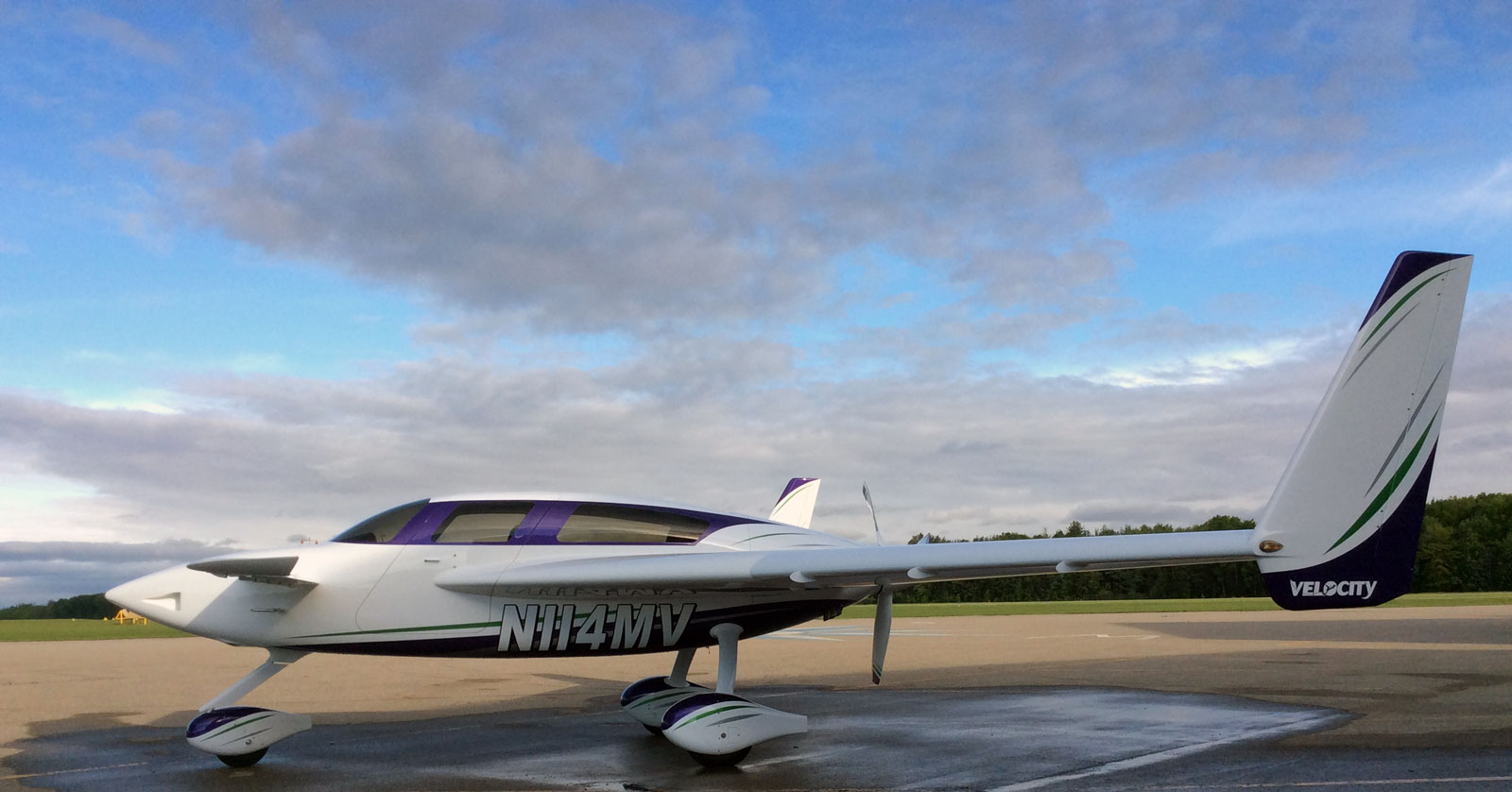
- Velocity XL with fixed-gear

General information
- Type: Homebuilt aircraft
- Manufacturer: Velocity, Inc.
- Number built: 229 (December 2011)

The Velocity XL (XL: Extra Large) is an American amateur-built aircraft, produced by Velocity, Inc. It is an enlarged version of their Velocity SE canard pusher design.

== Design and development ==
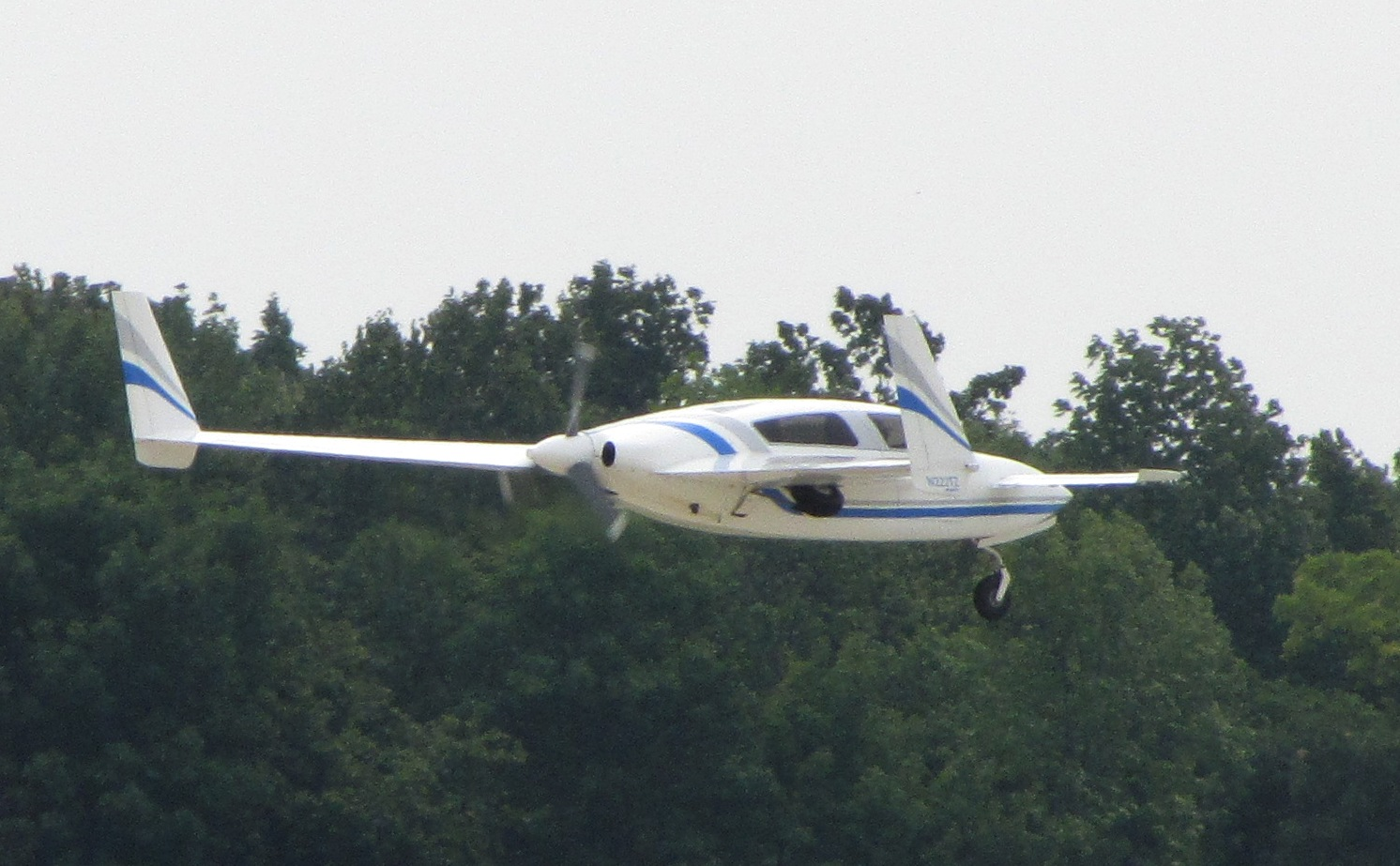
Gear retraction of a Velocity on takeoff

The Velocity XL is 12 in (310 mm) longer and has a 20 in (510 mm) greater span than the SE. The standard XL has a cruising range of 875 nautical miles (1,620 km; 1,007 mi) and a 75% power cruising speed of 185 knots (213 mph; 343 km/h) air speed.

The XL is available in both fixed gear (FG) and retractable gear (RG) form and can accommodate either three or four passengers plus a pilot. The five seat versions, the XL-5 and the TXL-RG-5, have a rear bench seat for three rather than the alternative separate pair of seats.

Engines available as kits from the manufacturer for all models are the Lycoming IO-360 of 180 to 200 hp (134 to 149 kW), Lycoming IO-540 of 260 to 300 hp (194 to 224 kW), Continental IO-550 of 310 to 350 hp (231 to 261 kW) and the Franklin 6A350C1 of 205 to 235 hp (153 to 175 kW). Builders may use these manufacturer kits or design their own engine installations using a variety of other engines of similar power output.

== Variants ==
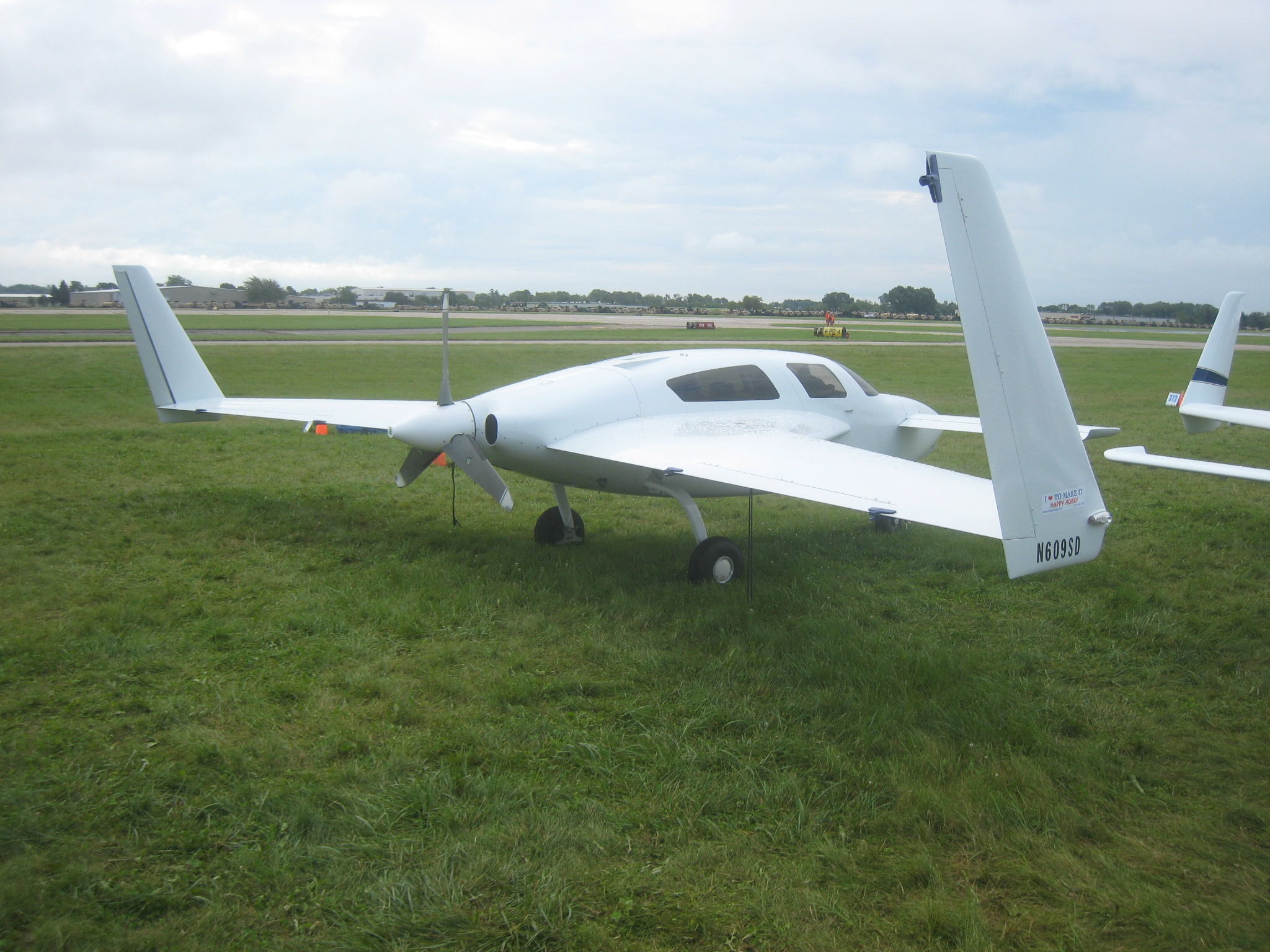
Velocity XL-RG

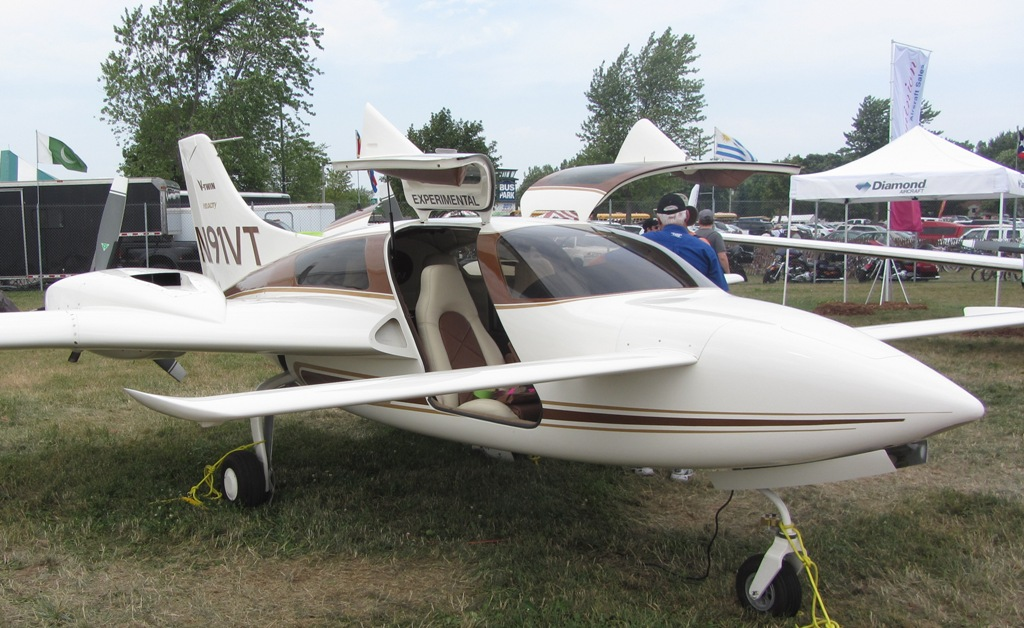
Velocity V-Twin

Velocity XL-FG
Fixed landing gear version with a gross weight of 2,700 lb (1,225 kg). Forty had been completed and flown by December 2011.
Velocity XL-FG-5
Fixed landing gear version with a gross weight of 2,900 lb (1,315 kg). Twenty-one had been completed and flown by December 2011.
Velocity XL-RG
Retractable landing gear version, with a gross weight of 2,700 lb (1,225 kg). 150 had been completed and flown by December 2011.
Velocity TXL-RG-5
Retractable landing gear version, with gross weight of 2,900 lb (1,315 kg). Eighteen had been completed and flown by December 2011.
Velocity V-Twin
Twin engine prototype, three built, powered by two Superior IO-320-A engines.

== Rocket Racers ==
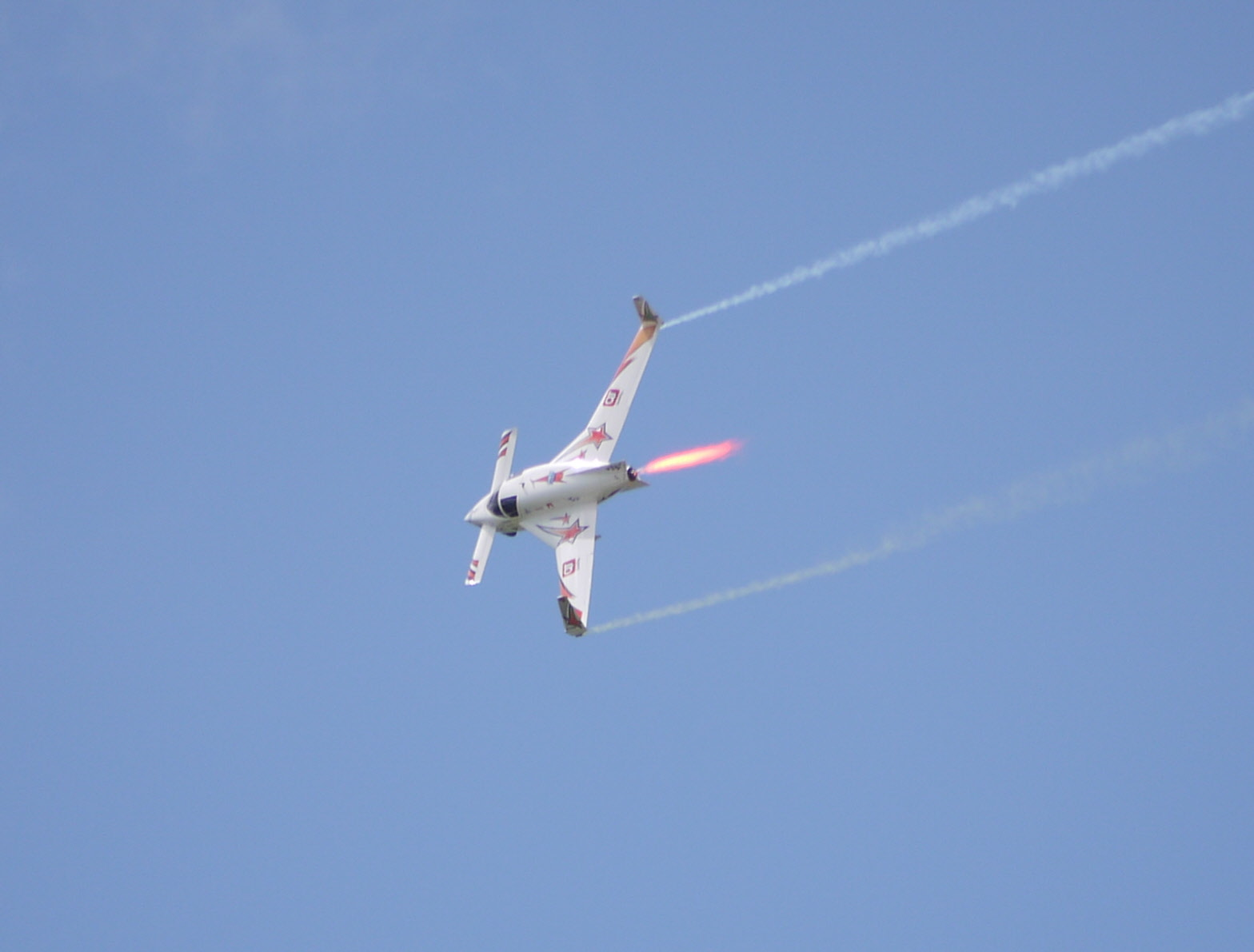
Rocket Racer at Tulsa International Airport, April 2010

The now-defunct Rocket Racing League utilized a highly modified Velocity XL FG airframe and an Armadillo Aerospace 2,500 pound thrust liquid oxygen (LOX) and ethanol rocket engine in both its Mark-II X-Racer and Mark-III X-Racer demonstration vehicles. The Mark-II utilized a standard fixed-gear Velocity XL airframe, modified for rocket propulsion. The Mark-III airframe was more extensively customized during manufacture, explicitly for rocket racing, with a canopy top, center seat and control stick and other enhancements, in addition to the rocket propulsion added to the Mark-II.

== Specifications (XL-RG) ==
Data from Jane's All the World's Aircraft 2013/14

General characteristics

- Crew: One
- Capacity: Three
- Length: 20 ft 0 in (6.10 m)
- Wingspan: 31 ft 0 in (9.45 m) rear wing; forewing 13 ft 8 in (4.17 m)
- Height: 8 ft 5 in (2.56 m)
- Wing area: 102 sq ft (9.5 m^{2}) rear wing.
- Empty weight: 1,700 lb (771 kg)
- Max takeoff weight: 2,701 lb (1,225 kg)
- Fuel capacity: 265 L (58 imp gal)
- Powerplant: 1 × Continental IO-550 air-cooled flat six, 310 hp (230 kW)
- Propellers: 3-bladed Catto

Performance

- Cruise speed: 240 mph (380 km/h, 210 kn) normal at 75% power
- Stall speed: 75 mph (121 km/h, 65 kn)
- Range: 1,150 mi (1,850 km, 1,000 nmi) at 65% power
- g limits: +9/-7
- Take-off run: 1,300 ft (396 m)
- Landing run: 1,500 ft (457 m)

== See also ==
- Velocity Velocity
- Freedom Aviation Phoenix
- Rutan Long-EZ
- Rutan VariEze
- Rutan Defiant
- Berkut aircraft
- Cozy MK IV
- Raptor Aircraft Raptor
