= Rocket Racing League =

Former air racing league

- Type: Private
- Industry: Air racing · Sports · Entertainment; Aerospace engineering
- Founded: 2005; 21 years ago
- Headquarters: New York, Boston, Santa Monica, Las Cruces
- Key people: · Granger Whitelaw · Peter Diamandis; Robert Hariri · Bill Koch · Bob Weiss
- Products: Rocketplane design, race promotions
- Number of employees: 15
- Website: www.rocketracingleague.com

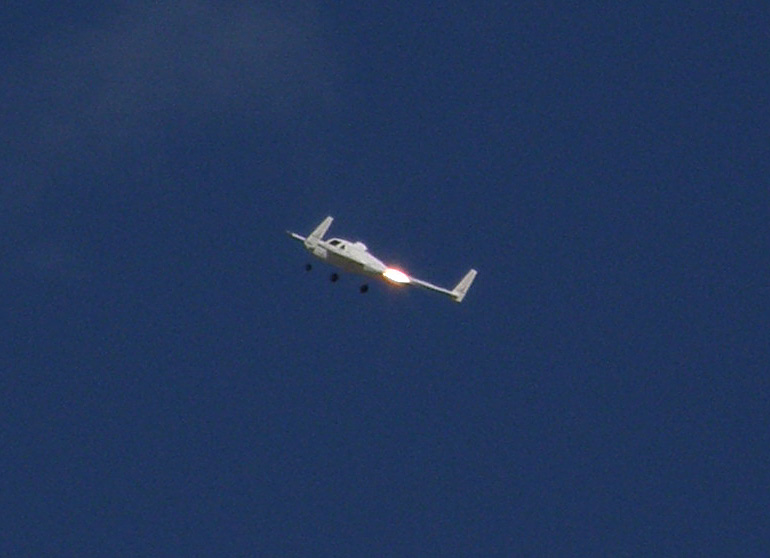
The prototype Rocket Racer, a modified Velocity SE climbing to 8400 feet on its first "up and away" flight, October 29, 2007, at the Mojave Spaceport

The Rocket Racing League which existed from 2005 through 2014, was an organization created to race rocket-powered aircraft around a closed-circuit air racetrack.

Founded in 2005, the league made its first public flights in 2010 and was working to begin regular racing seasons. The "Rocket Racers" were slated to compete in the air and on a virtual racetrack easily viewed by a live audience as well as projected on large screen and handheld electronic displays.

Three prototype canard-style Rocket Racer aircraft were built between 2006 and 2010. The league had planned to hold its inaugural race season in 2008 with four races, but encountered financial difficulties that delayed fielding of Rocket Racers by the six teams that had been previously announced. With the addition of venture capital funding in mid-2009, technology development continued. One exhibition occurred in 2010, with another round of plans for an inaugural season of races in 2011. The 2011 races were never scheduled and the league was defunct by 2014.

== Background ==
Projected to be an hour and one half in length, the races were intended to be between Rocket Racer planes that used liquid oxygen and either kerosene or ethanol fuel with a burn time of four minutes. The rocketplanes were expected to cost less than US$1 million each. The planes were based on the fixed-gear Velocity SE modified by XCOR Aerospace and the retractible gear Velocity XL modified by Armadillo Aerospace for the purpose of rocket racing. The Velocity airframe was derived from a commercially available kit plane that traced its design heritage to the Rutan Long-EZ, which had been modified to accept rocket power and custom avionics. In order to provide the airframes, RRL purchased the aircraft's manufacturer, Velocity Aircraft, in April 2008.

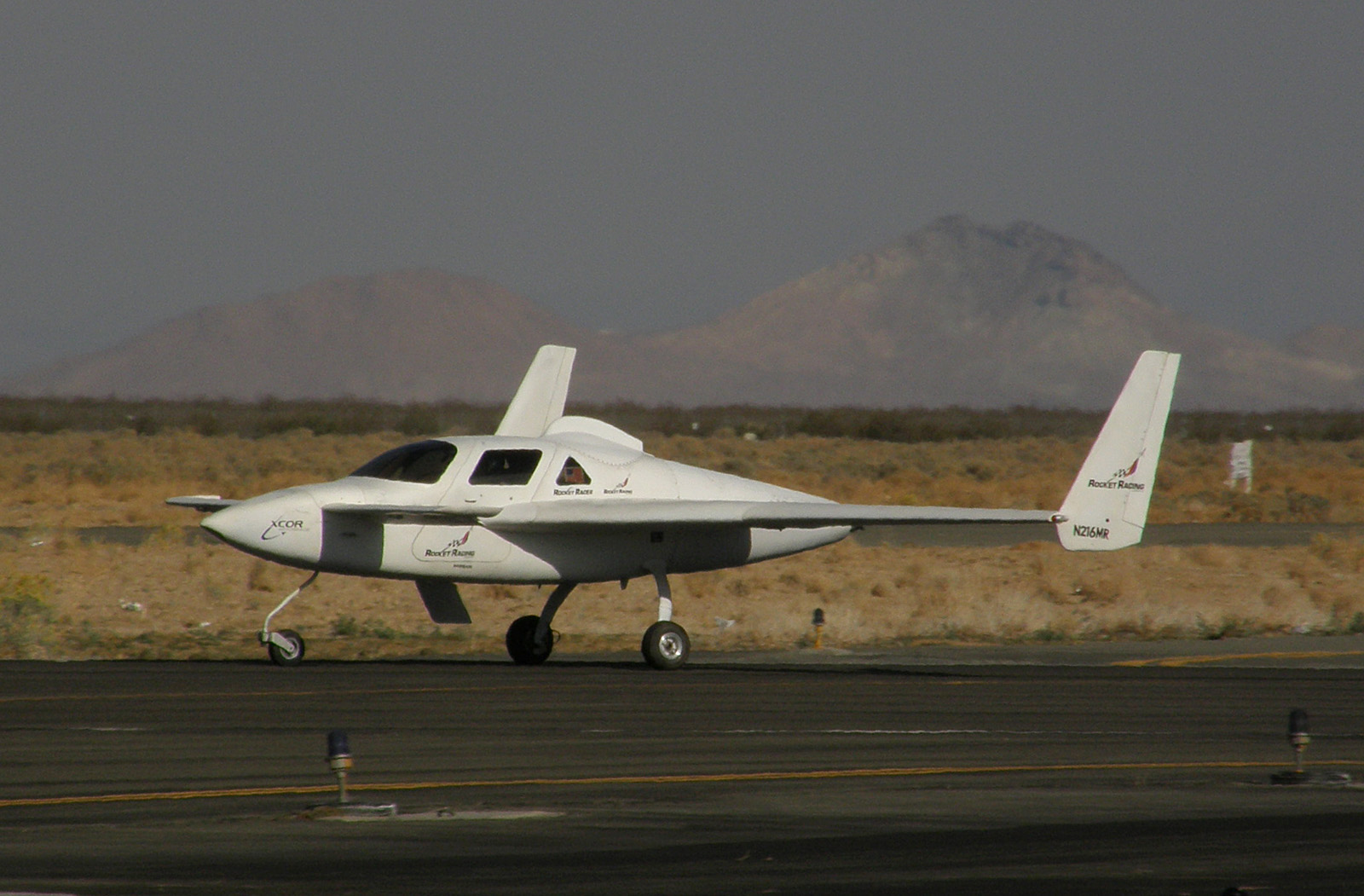
The Rocket Racer on landing roll-out at Mojave

The RRL had been called "NASCAR with rockets", XCOR Aerospace flew the Rocket Racer for a public audience at the 2008 EAA AirVenture Airshow at Oshkosh, Wisconsin. If league competition were to begin, Whitelaw indicated tournament semifinals would be held each September in Nevada, with finals each October in New Mexico at the X Prize Cup competing for a $2 million championship purse.

Races were to have taken place on a race course two miles (3 km) long, one mile (1.6 km) wide, and 1,500 feet (460 m) in the air. A typical race would take about one hour, and fans would be able to see multiple camera views, including cockpit, "on-track," "side-by-side" and wing-angle views.

Additionally, a computer game had been planned which was to have interfaced with racer positional data in real time over the internet, allowing players to virtually compete with the rocket pilots.

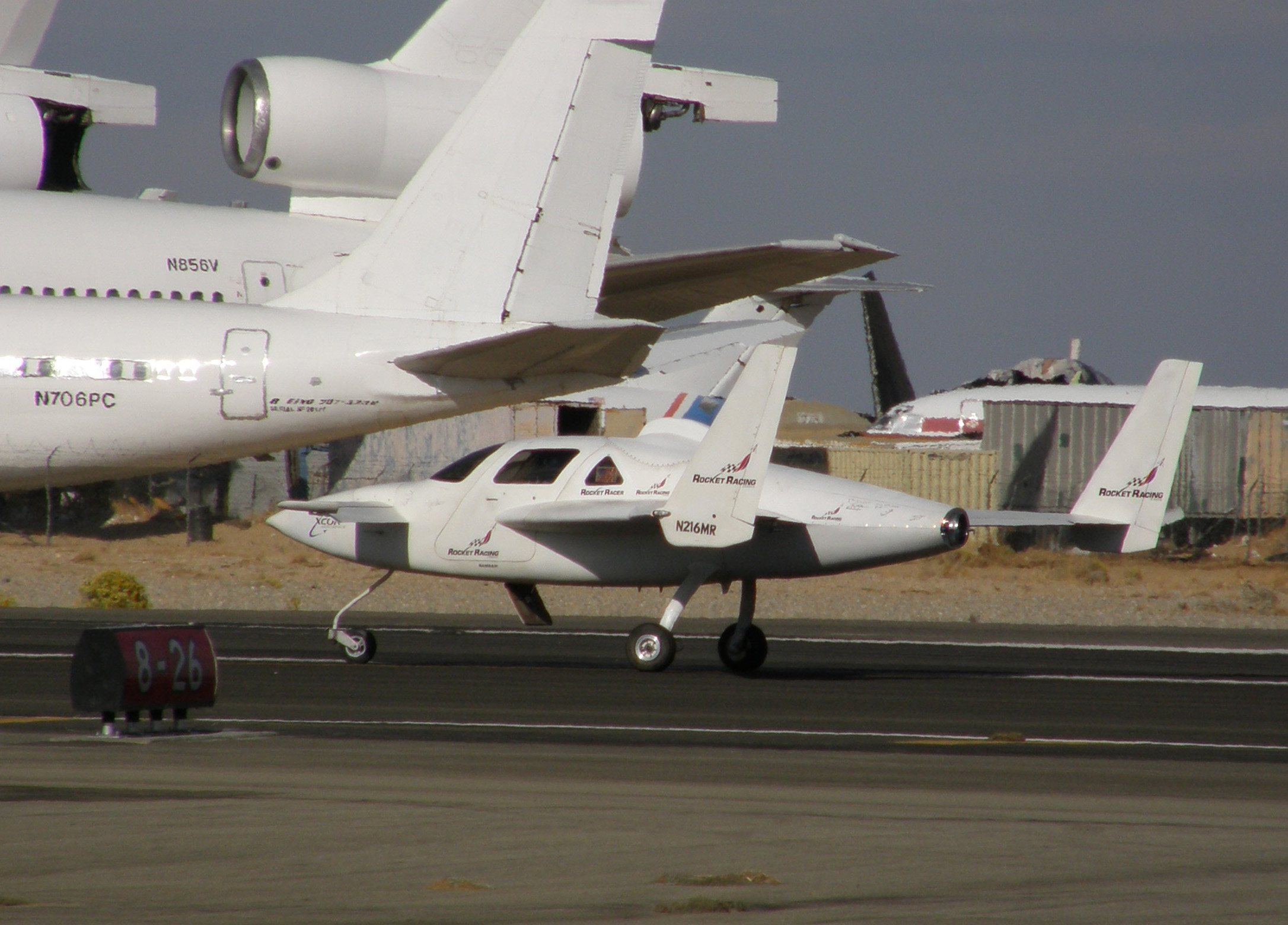
Aft view of the Rocket Racer on landing roll-out at Mojave

=== The Track ===
The proposed "track" for a typical Rocket Race was to have begun with a staggered start. Pilots were to take off in pairs a few minutes apart, they would be competing against the clock but would maneuver around each other much like NASCAR. The pilots would be guided by a virtual three-dimensional "track" projected in their head-up display. Each racer was to have a separate track to follow but the courses were planned to be close together to build excitement.

=== Teams ===
As of 2008, there were six teams registered to compete in the inaugural 2008 race season, Rocket Star Racing, Team Extreme Rocket Racing, Canada-based Beyond Gravity Rocket Racing, Bridenstine Rocket Racing, Santa Fe Racing and Thunderhawk Rocket Racing.

As of 2012, RRL claimed that "official team recruitment will commence as the production-level Rocket Racers near completion", listing five "candidate teams of the RRL franchise": Bridenstine Rocket Racing, Santa Fe Racing, Rocket Star Racing, Team Extreme Rocket Racing, and Canada-based Beyond Gravity Rocket Racing.

== History ==
The formation of the league was announced by Granger Whitelaw, and Peter Diamandis, founder of the Ansari X-Prize, in October 2005 in partnership with the Reno Air Races. According to Diamandis, the purpose of the league was to "inspire people of all ages to once again look up into the sky and find inspiration and excitement."

Initial plans called for a four-team league finals in 2006, to be followed by 10 teams competing in 2007, with video games based on the competition also out in 2007. In 2006, analysts identified doubts about the economics of the venture, and especially of the ability of RRL to attract a large fanbase similar to IndyCar and NASCAR. In the event, no races occurred in either 2006 or 2007.

In April 2008, the league stated that it was "ready for competition [announcing] four exhibition races will be held later [in the] year, one in Las Cruces."

On April 14, 2008, the Racing Rocket Racing Composite Corporation, a subsidiary of the Rocket Racing League, acquired Velocity Aircraft. The RRL announced their goal was to "produce an airframe that will be consistent for all competing Rocket Racers."

On May 26, 2010, a Velocity employee posted to the builder's email-list a note from Scott and Duane Swing that stated that they had bought back full ownership of Velocity Inc from Rocket Racing League. The RRL now owns no share of Velocity Inc.

=== League financial difficulties ===
None of the four planned 2008 races were actually run. The Rocket Racing League had difficulty in attracting and retaining sufficient financial backing, from both investors and sponsors, in order to get an initial racing season firmly scheduled in 2008, 2009, or 2010. Some progress with the rocket and aircraft technology continued however, but by 2014, the league had gone defunct.

The league twice failed to complete construction of six hangars contracted to be built on land adjacent to Spaceport America near Las Cruces, New Mexico. As of January 2009, the league was at risk of having their leases with the City of Las Cruces terminated.

In July 2009, the league announced the closing of a venture capital financing round of US$5.5 million. The funds were to be used for ongoing operations and for the development of a next-generation Rocket Racer.

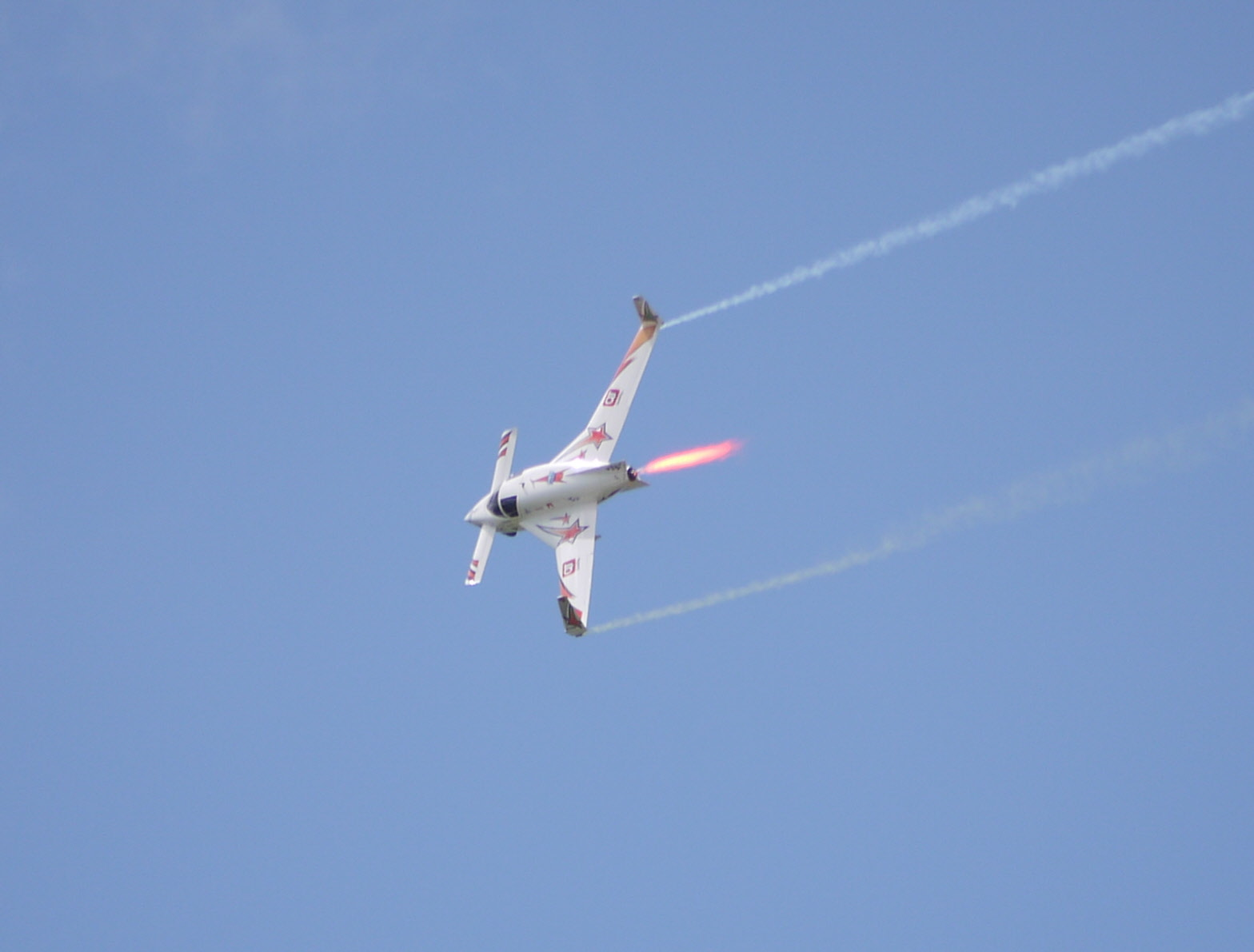
Rocket Racer at Tulsa International Airport, April 2010

As of February 2010, Peter Diamandis suggested that 2010 could be the year that we see "more than one racer in the air and possibly in exhibition races." Non-exhibition "live" races were to occur as early as 2011. Also in February, the Tulsa Air and Space Museum and Planetarium (TASM) announced that it would partner with the Rocket Racing League to host an exhibition flight of a Rocket Racer at the QuikTrip Air and Rocket Show at Tulsa International Airport in April 2010.

The Rocket Racing League announced a "2010 World Exhibition Tour" on April 24, 2010, when they unveiled their Mark-III X-racer rocket plane at the QuikTrip Air & Rocket Racing Show in Tulsa, Oklahoma. The RRL exhibition flights at Tulsa were the first simultaneous flights of two rocket-powered airplanes in the history of peacetime aviation. RRL duplicated this historic feat later that day. The league's intent in such exhibitions was to "build up the league's fan base, in addition to perfecting operations and technologies, before the league's official launch in 2012." The April event in Tulsa was the only RRL exhibition of 2010.

The league's financial difficulties continued in 2011 and no races were organized.

By 2014, persons formerly involved with the league had made public statements that the league had failed and was now defunct.

== Rocket Racers ==
The Rocket Racing League had been developing prototype Rocket Racers since 2006, working with one airframe manufacturer and two rocket engine producers on three prototype aircraft to date. All three of the airframes have been of the canard configuration to more easily accommodate the rocket propulsion technology.

A fifth model was proposed, but not built, in 2011: the Mark-V X-Racer.

=== Predecessor aircraft ===
XCOR Aerospace developed the XCOR EZ-Rocket, later flown under Rocket Racing League sponsorship as an X-Racer prototype rocketplane. First flight was July 21, 2001 at Mojave Airport in Mojave, California. This XCOR technology demonstrator was a converted Rutan Long-EZ and, in its final version, utilized two 400 lbf (1.8 kN) thrust XCOR Aerospace isopropyl-alcohol-powered rocket engines of engine type XR-4A3. XCOR flew the EZ-Rocket for several years in development and demonstration flights, including, in collaboration with the RRL, at the 2005 X-Prize Cup in New Mexico.

By 2006, the design-point for the RRL racer had become a single rocket engine utilizing kerosene as the rocket fuel, carrying 1,000 lb (450 kg) of liquid oxygen in its flight oxidizer tank.

The first RRL prototype built, known as the Mark-I X-Racer, was built on a Velocity SE airframe and was also powered by XCOR Aerospace rocket technology, a regeneratively-cooled and pump-fed XR-4K14 rocket engine. This rocket-powered aircraft flew several demonstration flights at the 2008 EAA AirVenture Oshkosh air show. The total thrust for the single-engine Mark-I X-Racer was 1,500 lbf (6,700 N), approximately twice that of the EZ-Rocket.

=== Mark-II and Mark-III X-Racers ===
As of 2010, the Rocket Racing League was utilizing a highly modified Velocity XL fixed-gear airframe and an Armadillo Aerospace 2,500 pound thrust liquid oxygen (LOX) and ethanol rocket engine in both its Mark-II X-Racer and Mark-III X-Racer demonstration vehicles. The Mark-II and Mark-III racers could take off just 4 seconds after the rocket engine was ignited; both vehicles were limited to a top speed of 300 mph (480 km/h). The rocket engine was a LOX-Ethanol, film-cooled, pressure-fed, blow-down design with a 10 to 15-foot (4.6 m)-long exhaust plume. Plume-seeding technology allowed the plume color to vary from red to green to yellow to better facilitate race spectators in keeping track of specific racers while in the air.

The Mark-II (N205MB) racer utilized a standard fixed-gear XL airframe, modified for the addition of the Armadillo rocket propulsion. The Mark-III (N133XP) airframe was modified during manufacturing at Velocity Aircraft explicitly for use as a Rocket Racer, with canopy top, center seat and control stick, and other enhancements.

=== Mark V X-Racer ===
The Mark-V proposed design resembles "a sleek, rocket-powered sailplane" and may be built at Velocity Aircraft, although no firm contracts are in place to do so as of November 2011.
