= Velocity Velocity =

American homebuilt aircraft

Velocity
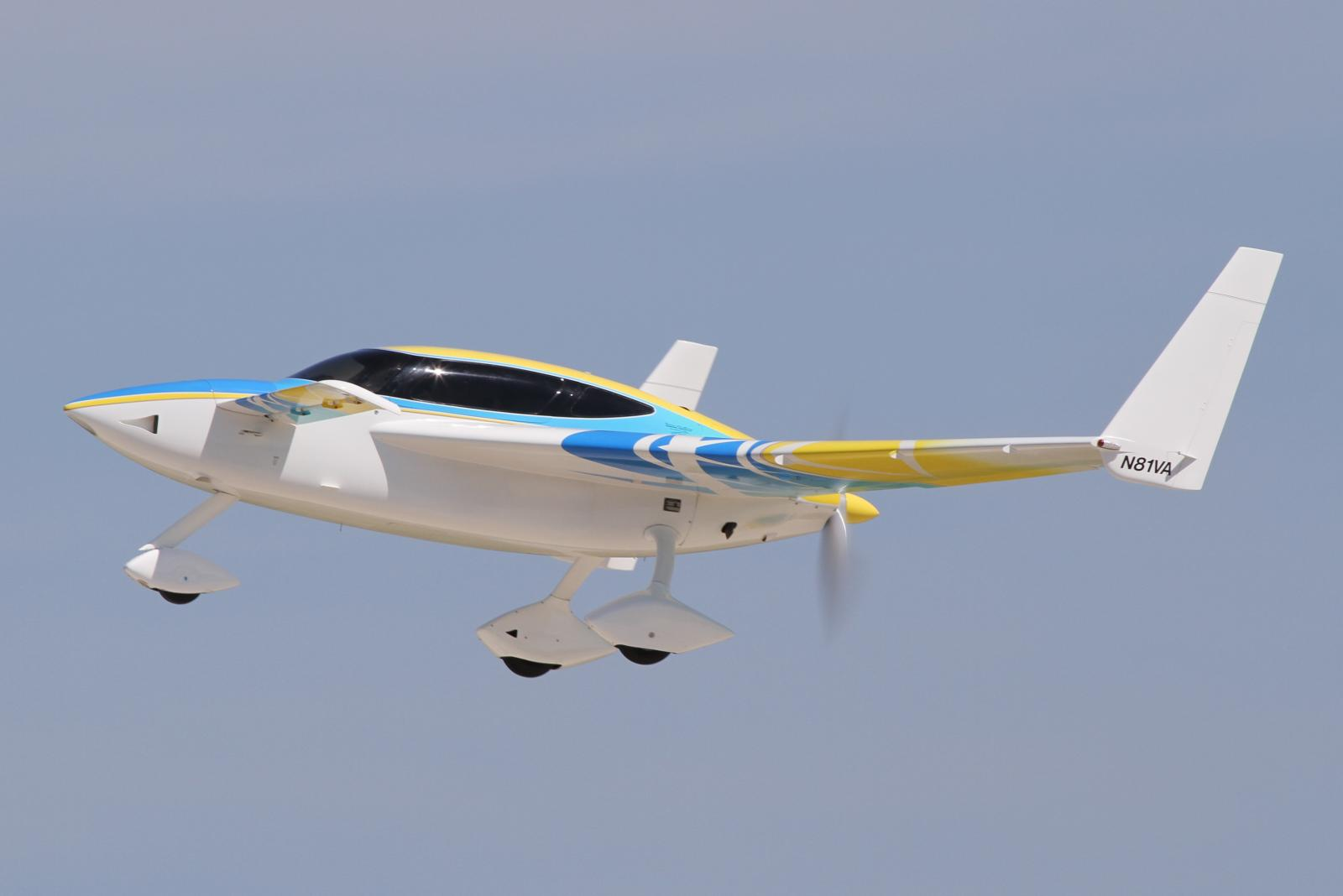
- Early production Velocity FG in flight

General information
- Type: Homebuilt aircraft
- National origin: United States
- Manufacturer: Velocity Aircraft

History
- Manufactured: 1985–present
- First flight: July 1985
- Developed from: Rutan Long-EZ
- Variants: Velocity XL, Rocket Racer

The Velocity is a canard pusher aircraft produced as a kit by Velocity Aircraft.

== Design and development ==
The prototype Velocity, first flown in July 1985, was a four-seat composite kit aircraft based on the Rutan Long-EZ. The aircraft was initially offered only with fixed landing gear, but an option for retractable gear was introduced in 1990. An optional larger wing was introduced in 1992, which gave the aircraft similar flight characteristics to the Cessna 172. Aircraft fitted with this new wing were initially referred to as the "Model 173".

An enlarged variant of the Velocity was introduced in 1997 as the Velocity XL.

== Variants ==
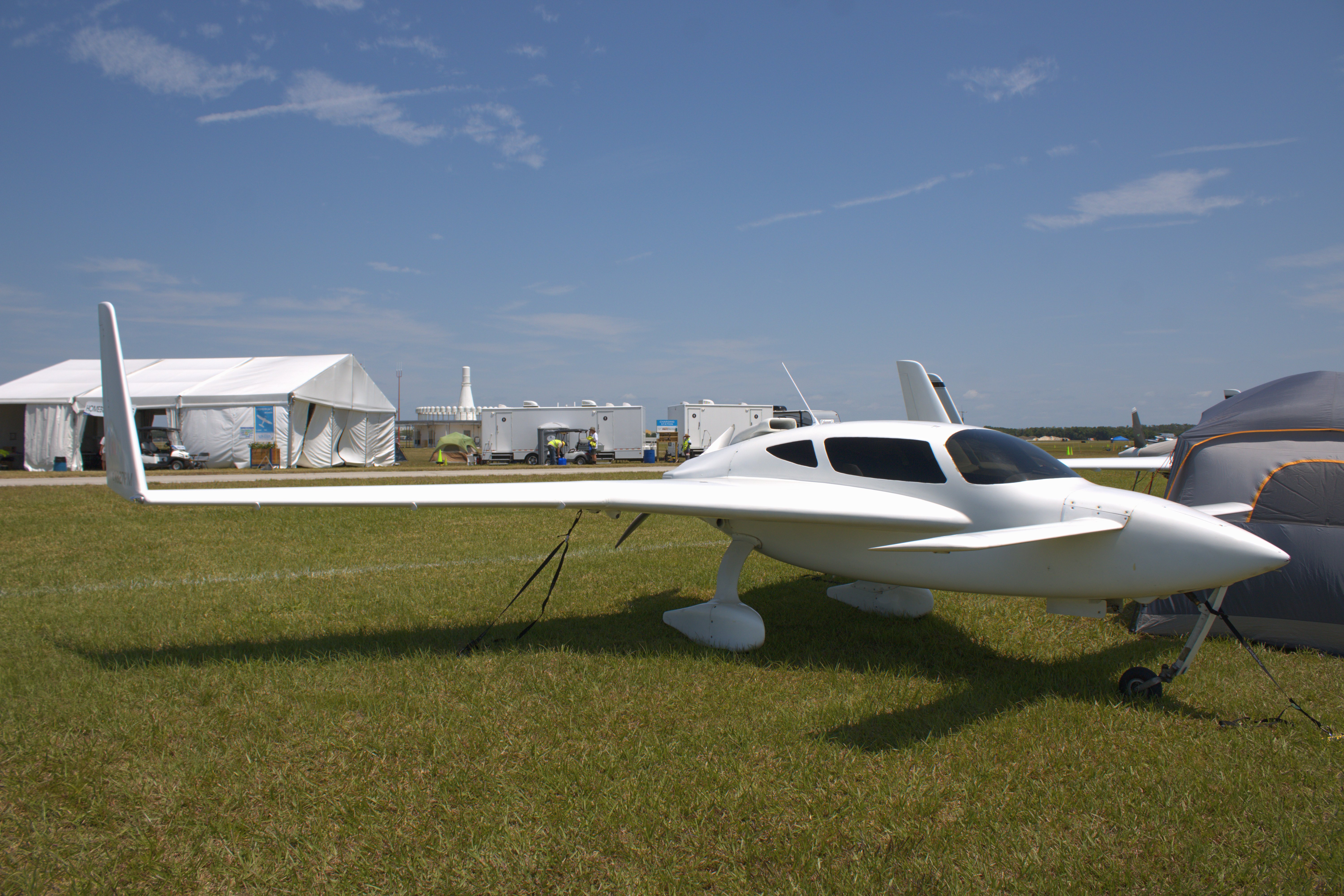
An original Velocity RG at Sun 'n Fun 2024. This aircraft has a retractable nose gear and fixed main gear.

Velocity
Prototype and early production variant. Introduced in 1985. A retractable-gear variant was introduced in 1990 as the Velocity RG, and the original fixed-gear variant became the Velocity FG.
Velocity 173
Variant fitted with an enlarged wing to improve performance. Offered in fixed-gear 173 FG and retractable-gear 173 RG variants. Later known as the Velocity LW.

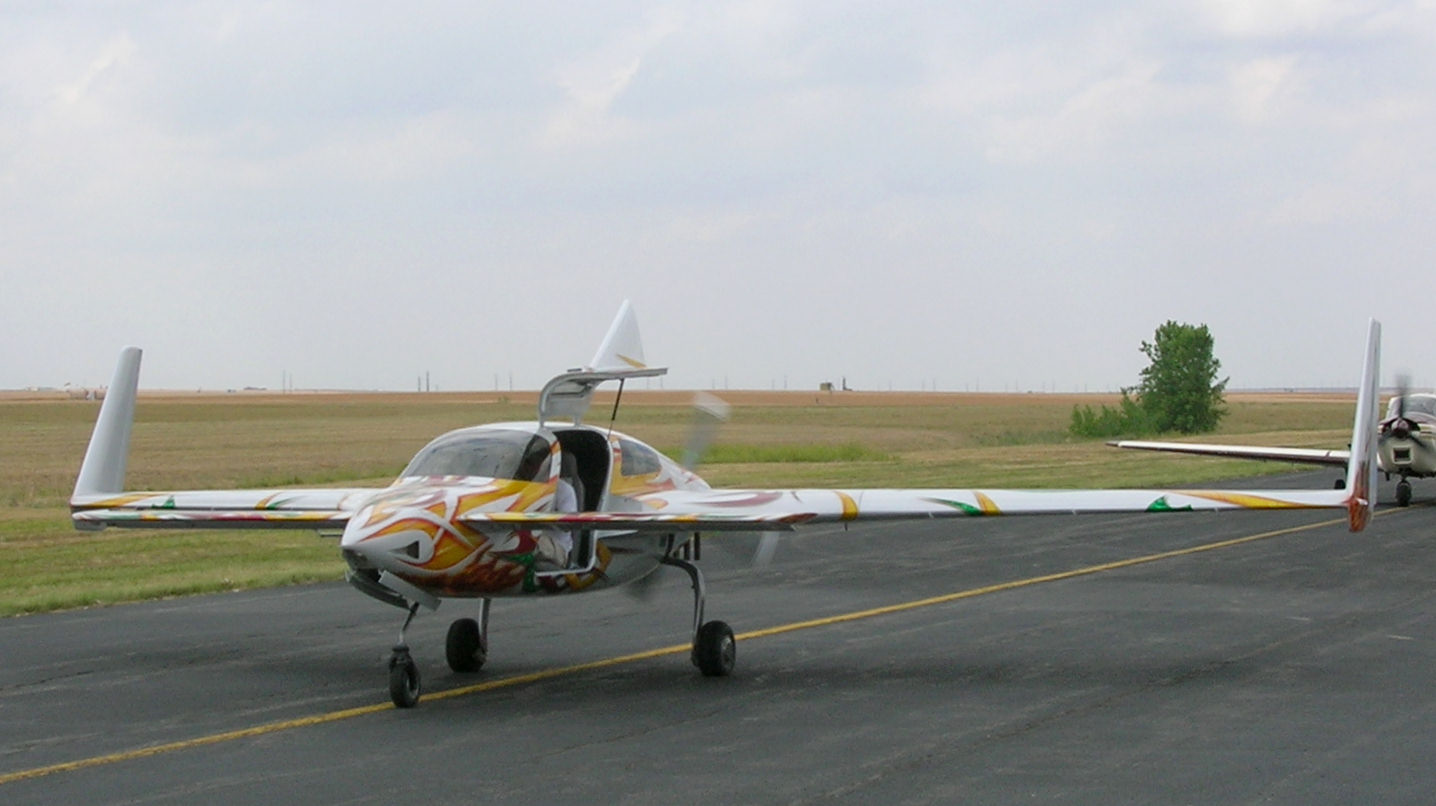
Velocity 173 RG Elite

Velocity 173 Elite
Improved Velocity 173 with gull-wing doors, a full-length center console, adjustable bucket seats, and an enlarged windshield. Offered in retractable-gear 173 RG Elite and fixed-gear 173 FG Elite variants. The Elite eventually replaced the original Velocity as the standard variant. By the second quarter of 2000, "small wing" variants of the Elite were also available.
Velocity SUV
"Sport Utility Velocity", low-cost variant with a single gull-wing door, dual-yoke controls, and only offered with fixed landing gear. The prototype was powered by a fuel-injected 170 hp (130 kW) Lycoming O-320-B1A engine driving an MT-Propeller constant-speed propeller. Production aircraft were intended to be powered by a 160 hp (120 kW) Lycoming engine, though 180 hp (130 kW) or 200 hp (150 kW) Lycoming engines and a 220 hp (160 kW) Franklin engine were also certified.
Velocity SE
"Standard Elite", replaced the SUV as the entry-level variant in 2002. The SE differs from the SUV primarily in that it has two doors, can be fitted with either a center-mounted control stick of a dual-control yoke, and is offered in both fixed-gear (as Velocity SE-FG) and retractable-gear (as Velocity SE-RG) variants. Intended to be powered by either a 160 hp (120 kW) Lycoming IO-320 or a 200 hp (150 kW) Lycoming IO-360 engine. A total of 88 SE-FGs and 180 SE-RGs had been completed and flown by December 2011.
Velocity SE-2
Improved SE with a wider cabin, increased fuel capacity, dual control sticks, and optional EFIS. In development as of 2022.
Velocity UAV
Unmanned aerial vehicle variant developed by Proxy Aviation Systems. Three aircraft had been built by 2010.

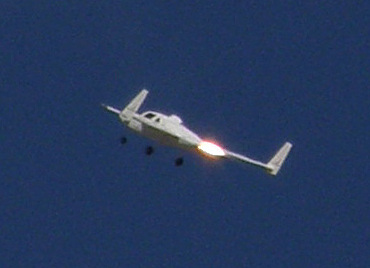
The prototype Rocket Racer, a modified Velocity SE climbing to 10,000 feet (3,000 m) on it first full flight, October 29, 2007, at the Mojave Spaceport

Rocket Racer
The Mark-I X-Racer, a rocketplane design for the Rocket Racing League built on a Velocity SE airframe. It was built by XCOR Aerospace with an XCOR XR-4K14 1,500 lbf (6,700 N) thrust rocket engine fuelled by LOX and kerosene. This rocket-powered aircraft flew several demonstration flights at the 2008 EAA AirVenture Oshkosh air show.

== Specifications (Velocity SE-RG IO-360) ==
Data from

General characteristics

- Crew: 1/2
- Capacity: 2/3 passengers / 1,000 lb (450 kg) payload
- Length: 19 ft (5.8 m)
- Wingspan: 29 ft 4 in (8.94 m)
- Height: 7 ft 9 in (2.36 m)
- Empty weight: 1,300 lb (590 kg)
- Gross weight: 2,300 lb (1,043 kg)
- Fuel capacity: 60 US gal (230 L; 50 imp gal)
- Powerplant: 1 × Lycoming IO-360 4-cyl. horizontally-opposed air-cooled piston engine, 200 hp (150 kW)

Performance

- Cruise speed: 187 kn (215 mph, 346 km/h) at 75% power
- Landing speed: 70 kn (130 km/h; 81 mph)
- Stall speed: 60 kn (69 mph, 110 km/h)
- Never exceed speed: 200 kn (230 mph, 370 km/h) IAS
- Range: 1,000 nmi (1,200 mi, 1,900 km) at 65% power
- Service ceiling: 20,000 ft (6,100 m)
- g limits: +12 -7
- Rate of climb: 1,200 ft/min (6.1 m/s)
- Wing loading: 18.88 lb/sq ft (92.2 kg/m^{2})

== See also ==
Related development

- Rutan Long-EZ
- Velocity XL
- Velocity V-Twin

Aircraft of comparable role, configuration, and era

- Berkut 360
- Cozy MK IV
- Raptor Aircraft Raptor
- Rutan Defiant
- Rutan VariEze
