= Berkut 360 =

American homebuilt canard aircraft

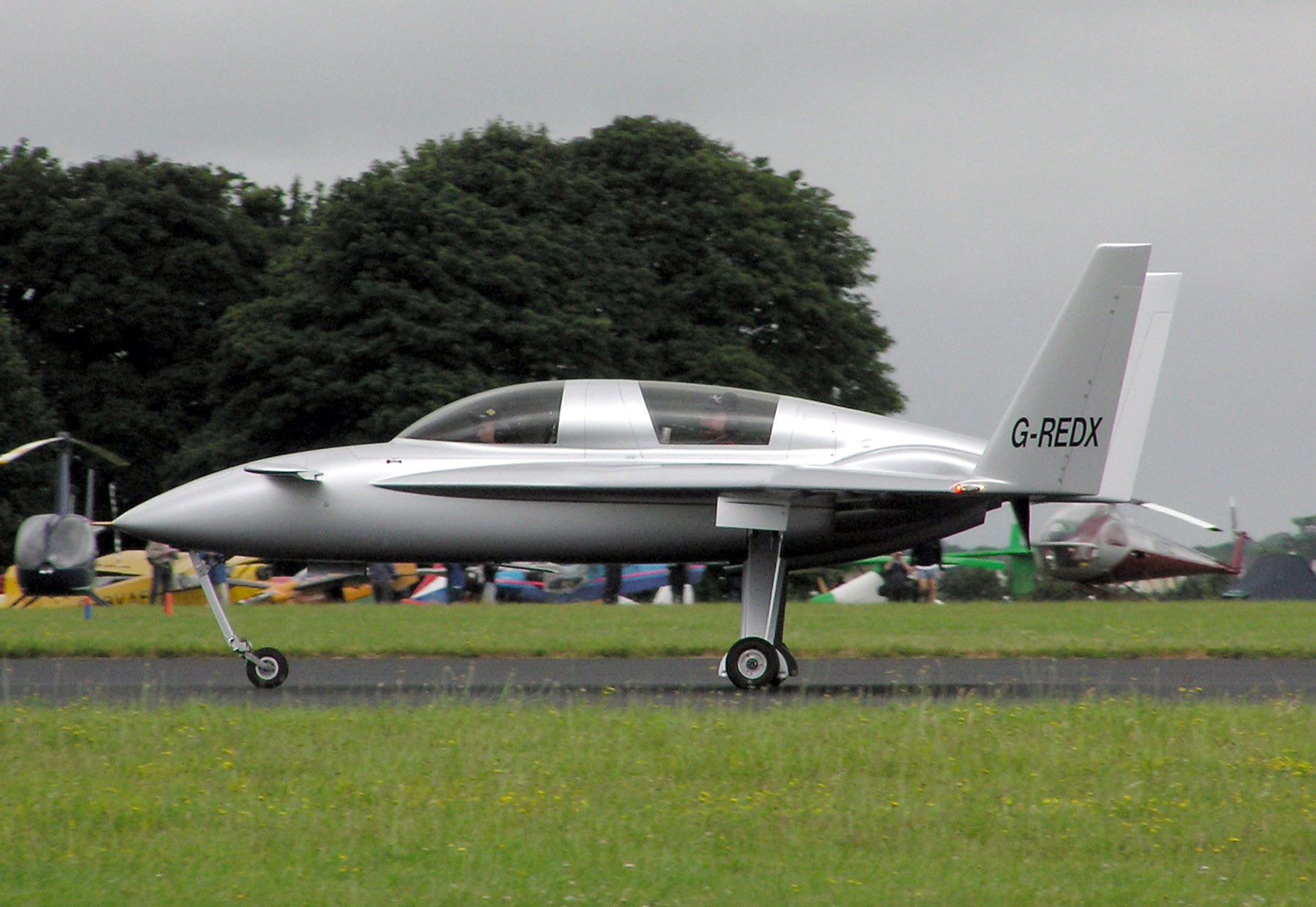

General information
- Type: Homebuilt aircraft
- Manufacturer: Berkut Aircraft
- Primary user: Private users
- Number built: 31

History
- Introduction date: 1989

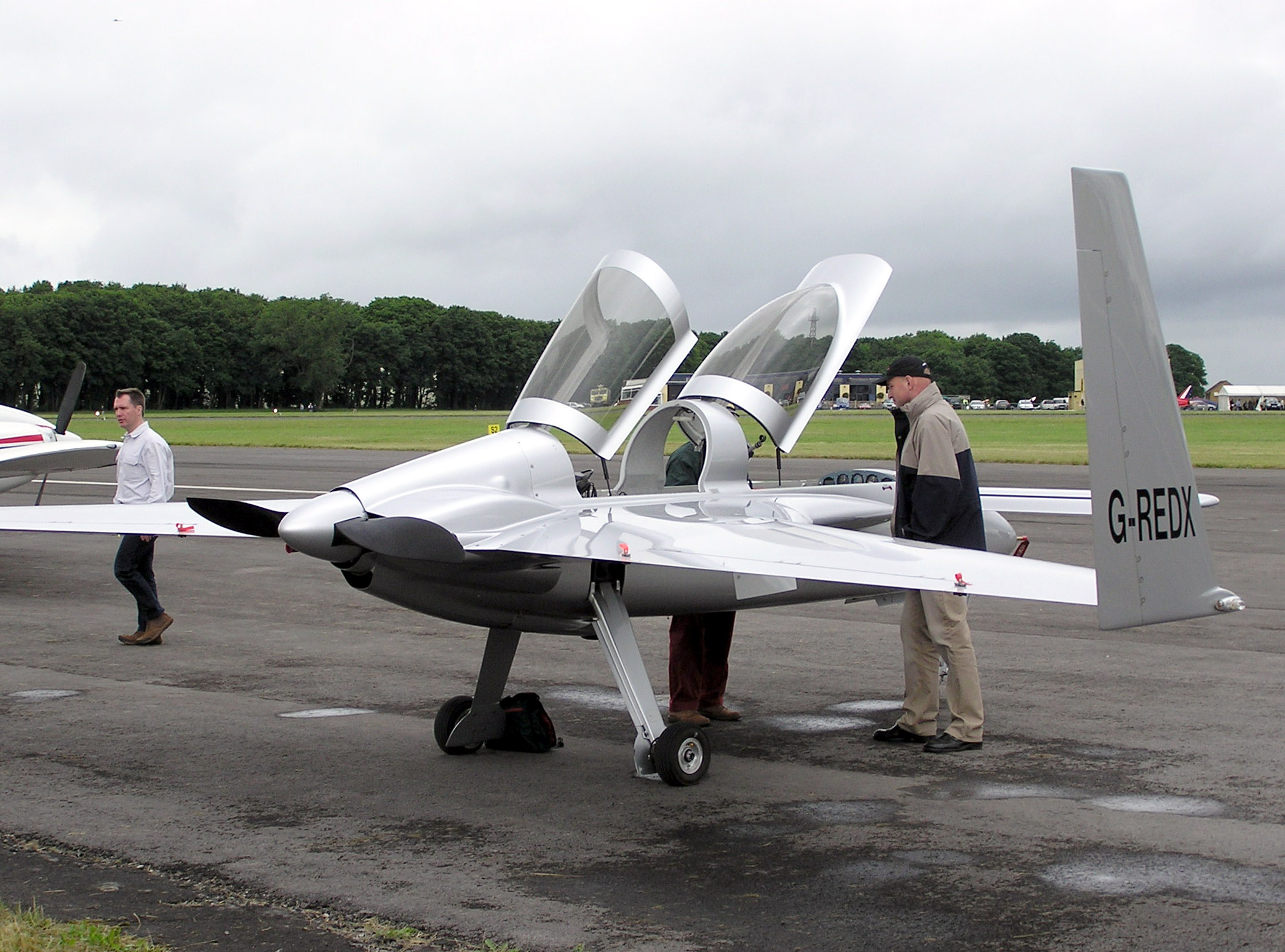
Berkut 360

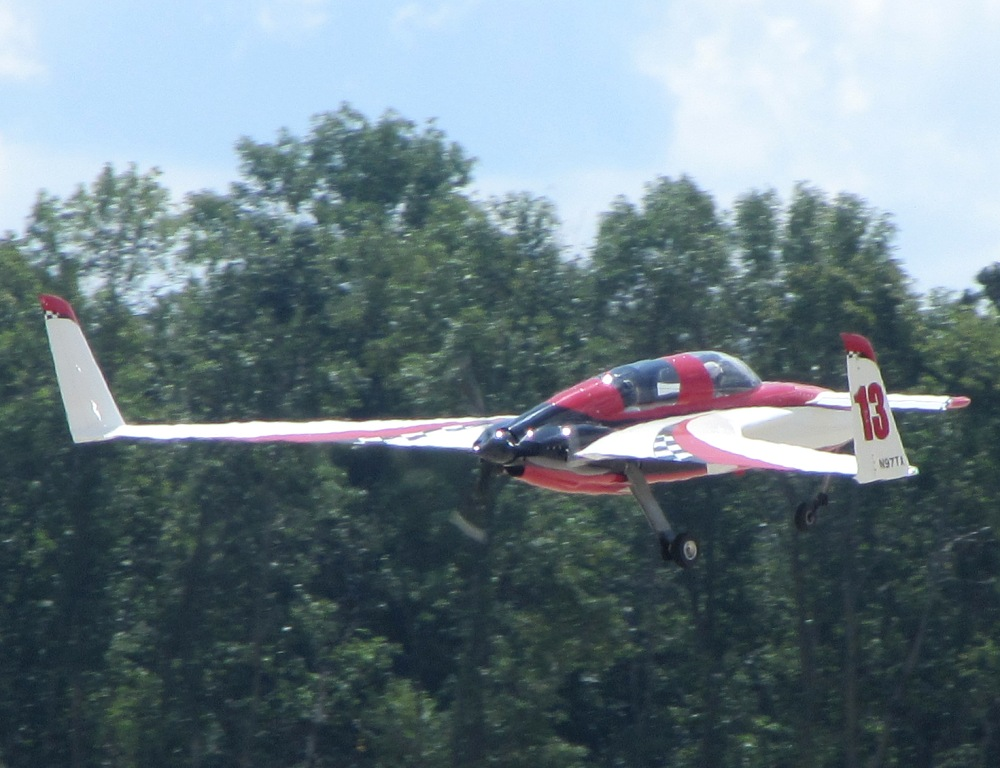
Berkut 360 takeoff

The Berkut 360 is a tandem-seating, two-seat homebuilt canard aircraft with pusher configuration and retractable landing gear, built primarily of carbon fiber and fiberglass.

The Berkut 360 is featured in the 2010 movie Kill Speed (Fast Glass).

== Development ==
The prototype Berkut was designed and built by Dave H. Ronneberg as part of a business partnership between Ronneberg and Donald S. Murphy, called Experimental Aviation, that lasted from 1989 to 1992.

In 1992 the partnership dissolved and Ronneberg, incorporating as Experimental Aviation, Inc., brought the aircraft to market as a kit, while Murphy wanted to shelve the project entirely. A subsequent series of lawsuits between the two resulted in bankruptcy for Ronneberg and Murphy as individuals and for Experimental Aviation as a corporation. The kit was resurrected in 1996 by Richard Riley and Renaissance Composites, with Ronneberg working as a consultant.

Berkut Engineering and Design, Inc. withdrew the aircraft from the market in 2002. Ronneberg continued with the project, which is now directed at UAV markets. A deal was struck in 2003 to sell the project to Republic Aerospace, but the deal fell through. Cruse was no longer involved with day-to-day operations, but maintained ownership until her death on August 22, 2009, when the aircraft she was flying — a borrowed Zivko Edge 540 — crashed in Buckinghamshire, England, during a qualifying flight for the World Aerobatic Championships.

Through the various incarnations, approximately 75 kits were sold and 20 airplanes completed.

== Configuration ==
The Berkut is derived from the Rutan Long-EZ, with the primary differences being retractable main landing gear, dual canopies, and molded fuselage, strakes, and wing spar. Like the Long EZ, the Berkut carries two people in a tandem seating arrangement. The front seat occupant has access to all instrumentation and controls. The rear seat, normally holding the passenger, is equipped with a side stick and throttle, but no rudder pedals, brakes, or instruments. Aerodynamic optimizations to the original Long-EZ airframe were made to increase performance and interior space. The fuselage was stretched and the nose, canard, instrument panel and pilot moved forward one foot (300 mm), to allow a heavier engine to be used in the rear. The main wing trailing edge was straightened, removing a small bend in the trailing edge of the Long EZ wing. The lower winglet was removed and the aileron size increased in both chord and span, significantly increasing roll rate.

Early Berkuts used wings and canard that were structurally similar to the Long-EZ and used solid blue 2 lb/cu. ft. density Dow STYROFOAM PI cores cut to shape with a hot-wire foam cutter, but with carbon fiber reinforced polymer skins instead of fiberglass. The fuselage and winglets remained fiberglass. Later versions (kits produced after spring 1999) used fully molded carbon fiber canards and wings with high density, 5 lb/cu. ft. 1/4" thick PVC or SAN foam cores, leaving only minor fairings and tip surfaces to be carved from foam. The Berkut has always used the Roncz 1145MS canard airfoil, which is more tolerant of insect and rain contamination than the GU 25-5(11)8 airfoil originally used on the Long-EZ.

The Berkut used a retractable main (rear) landing gear system designed by Shirl Dickey for his E-Racer homebuilt. Originally, Berkut used gear parts produced by Dickey, but over time they were repeatedly re-engineered and strengthened. Later kits had gear components produced entirely in-house. Like the earlier Vari-Eze and Long EZ, the Berkut kneels with its nose gear retracted to prevent the aircraft from tipping over backwards when parked without a pilot in the front seat. Some early Berkuts utilized hydraulic nose-gear extension systems, but most have used an electro-mechanical jack-screw. With the electric system, the pilot and passenger can climb into the cockpit, then extend the nose gear, raising the airplane with occupants inside.

While the Long-EZ, originally designed for the Lycoming O-235 108-118 hp engine, was closer in the design of the Berkut, the latter was designed from the outset for the larger Lycoming IO-360 180 hp engine. The aircraft was later adapted, with a different engine mount, cowls and battery location, to accept the 260 hp Lycoming IO-540, which most builders chose. With the O-540, some have reportedly reached speeds of 300 mph in level flight.

== Selected accidents ==
Irrespective of cause, the Berkut has a poor overall safety record, with at least 6 of the 31 aircraft built having been involved in serious to catastrophic accidents or incidents. The manufacturer or somebody associated closely with the manufacturer has explained this as follows:

"There were some accidents the first years caused by errors in the assembly, so it was decided to start selling it finished (or with assistance during the final construction). There were also some accidents that were caused by pilot errors. But there has never been an accident caused by failures in the airplane or the design."

Here are 5 "selected" accidents/incidents:

N91DR
The original prototype, crashed by Rick Fessenden at an airshow at Santa Paula, California on 12 August 1995. Although the National Transportation Safety Board (NTSB) investigation concluded that an accelerated stall during Fessenden's "wind-up turn" — a level, 360-degree, very high-g turn — caused the airplane to crash, examination of videotapes of the crash gave a strong indication that the pilot blacked out under 9g+. Fessenden was killed.

N260DG
The first Berkut 540, built by Dan Gray, crashed at Santa Paula, California on 9 June 1996. Gray started and finished his first flight at nearby Camarillo airport, but on his second flight he chose to return to Santa Paula. On final approach his engine stopped and, in attempting to set down on a nearby freeway, he collided head-on with a Honda station wagon. The aircraft was extensively damaged but Gray was only bruised. The cause was found to be an incorrectly rebuilt fuel pump.

N600SE
Built by Michael Kashan, this airplane served as the company demonstrator for several years. While being flown by another pilot on 1 July 2000, the aircraft encountered a dust devil on final approach at Jackpot, Nevada. This flipped the airplane upside down and it tumbled down the runway. Both wings were broken, the right strake and spar were broken halfway between the fuselage and the end of the spar, the main gear was torn out, and the nose crushed back to the instrument panel. The pilot's legs were broken, but the passenger suffered only a minor cut to the scalp. The airplane was rebuilt and is flying again.

N538AJ
This airplane, owned by John Daniels, has had several accidents, all involving the landing gear. The NTSB report concerns its first, a gear collapse at Jackson Hole, Wyoming on 18 June 1996. Later, the airplane overran the runway at First Flight airport, tearing out its gear legs. There have been no injuries from any of the accidents.

N827CM
Built by Steve Drybread. During a test flight on 23 May 2002 near Anderson, Indiana, Drybread omitted the main canard attachment bolts. The canard separated in flight, and Drybread was killed.
N5439N
Built by Steve Drybread. While being flown by its owner, Charles Bracken, the CB540 aircraft struck high tension power wires near Lapeer, Michigan on 19 June 2004, and crashed into the ground. The airplane was destroyed, the nose crushed back to the pilot's seat. Bracken's legs were broken.

N3255U
Built by Jerrold S. Jorritsma, a jet powered variant suffered engine failure just after takeoff.The pilot was unable to return to the runway and the emergency landing caused substantial damage to the fuselage and wings of the aircraft.

== Variants ==
Berkut 360
Original configuration, retractable gear, Lycoming 4-cylinder 360-cubic-inch, fuel-injected, 180 hp engine.
Berkut FG360
Fixed-gear version of the 360. (Offered but never built, except as a UAV by Geneva Aerospace)
Berkut 540
Lycoming 6-cylinder, 540-cubic-inch, 260 hp engine upgrade. Changes consisted of larger cowls, a different engine mount, custom engine mount ears, stiffer engine isolators, a custom sump modification and different cooling baffles.
Berkut FG540
Fixed-gear version of the 540. (offered, but never built)
Mobius
A modified Berkut with a single canopy and automated flight equipment where the second seat would be located, for UAV research and development with a 20-hour endurance. Two aircraft have been built with a third one in development. N442LT is the first tail number. N497LT is the second.
Berkut Jet
A Berkut using a modified GE T-58 turbine engine, built by Jerrold Jorritsma, registration number N3255U. Crashed in Loveland, Colorado on May 9, 2010.
Berkez or Berk-EZ
Heavily modified Rutan Long-EZ homebuilt with Berkut components.

== Specifications ==
Data from Brassey's World Aircraft & Systems Directory 1999/2000

General characteristics

- Crew: 2
- Length: 18 ft 6 in (5.64 m)
- Wingspan: 26 ft 8 in (8.13 m)
- Height: 7 ft 6 in (2.29 m)
- Airfoil: canard: Roncz R1145MS; main wing: Eppler 1230 mod
- Empty weight: 1,035 lb (469 kg)
- Gross weight: 2,000 lb (907 kg)
- Powerplant: 1 × Lycoming IO-360 4-cylinder air-cooled horizontally-opposed fuel-injected piston engine, 205 hp (153 kW)
- Propellers: 2-bladed variable-pitch pusher propeller

Performance

- Maximum speed: 215 kn (247 mph, 398 km/h)
- Cruise speed: 191 kn (220 mph, 354 km/h)
- Stall speed: 61 kn (70 mph, 113 km/h)
- Range: 1,066 nmi (1,227 mi, 1,974 km)
- Service ceiling: 32,000 ft (9,800 m)
- Rate of climb: 612 ft/min (3.11 m/s)

== See also ==
- Rutan Long-EZ
- Rutan VariEze
- Rutan Defiant
- Steve Wright Stagger-Ez
- Cozy MK IV
- Velocity SE
- Velocity XL
- Glassic SQ2000
