= Rutan Long-EZ =

Homebuilt aircraft with canard layout

Long-EZ
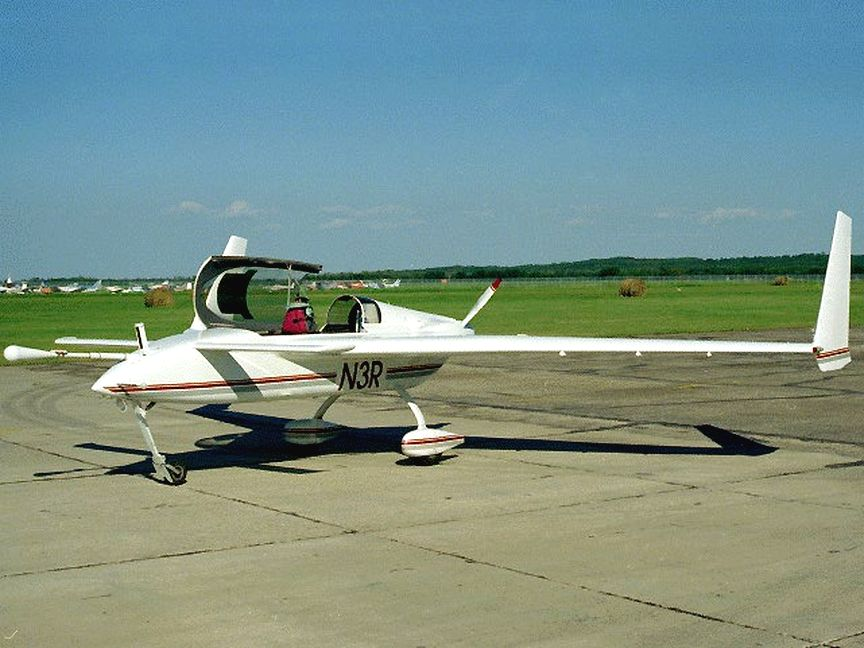
- Long-EZ built by Timothy Crawford and operated by NOAA

General information
- Type: Homebuilt aircraft
- National origin: United States of America
- Manufacturer: Rutan Aircraft Factory; TERF Inc, (plans suppliers)
- Designer: Burt Rutan
- Number built: over 800 registered in the U.S.

History
- First flight: June 12, 1979

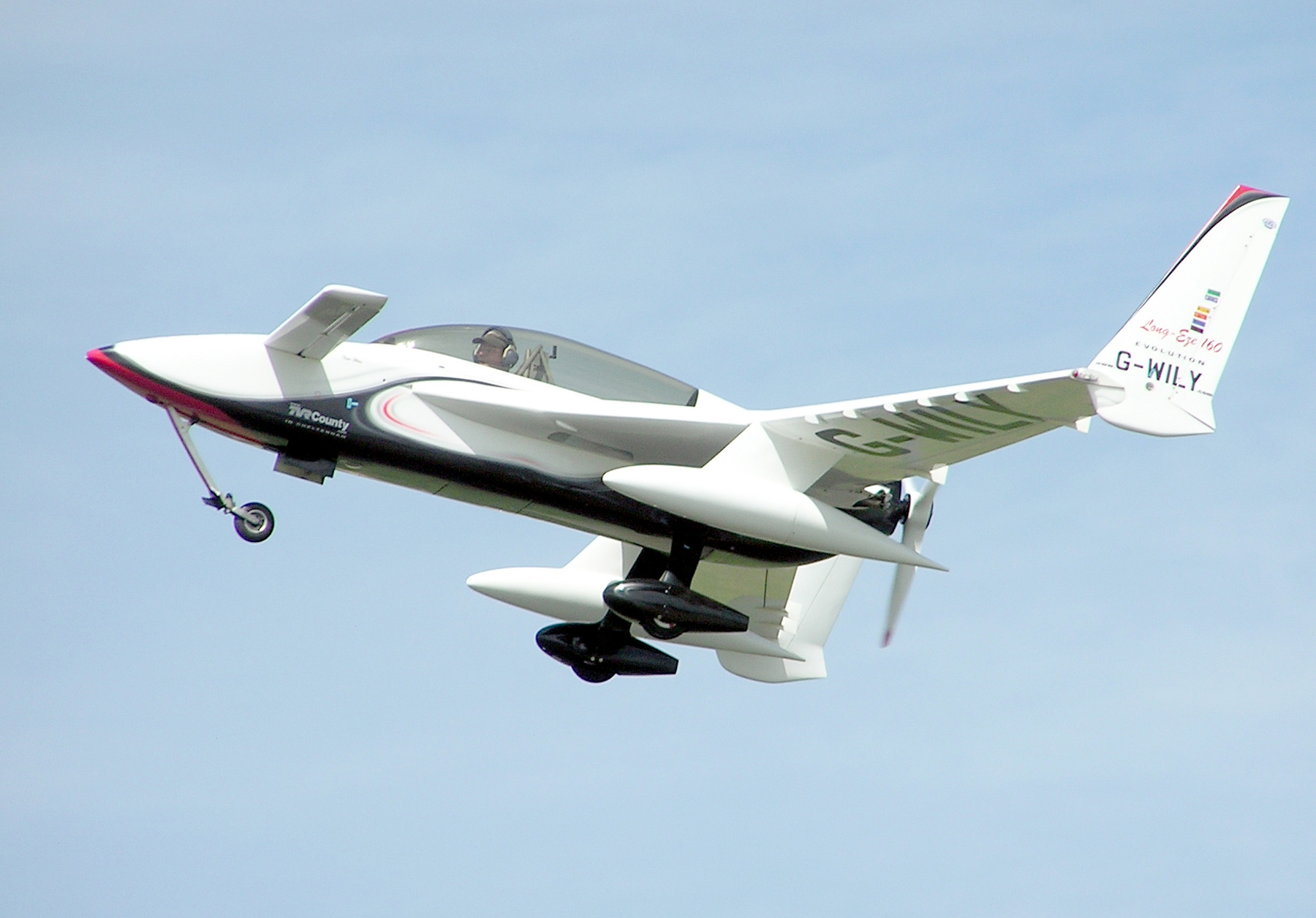
Rutan Long-EZ G-WILY fitted with baggage pods under wings

The Rutan Model 61 Long-EZ (pronounced Long-Easy) is a tandem 2-seater homebuilt aircraft designed by Burt Rutan's Scaled Composites. The Long-EZ has a canard layout, a swept wing with wingtip rudders, and a pusher engine and propeller. The tricycle landing gear has fixed main wheels with streamlined spats and a retractable nosewheel. Its predecessor was the VariEze, plans for which were first available to homebuilders in 1976. The prototype Long-EZ, N79RA, first flew on June 12, 1979.

== Design ==
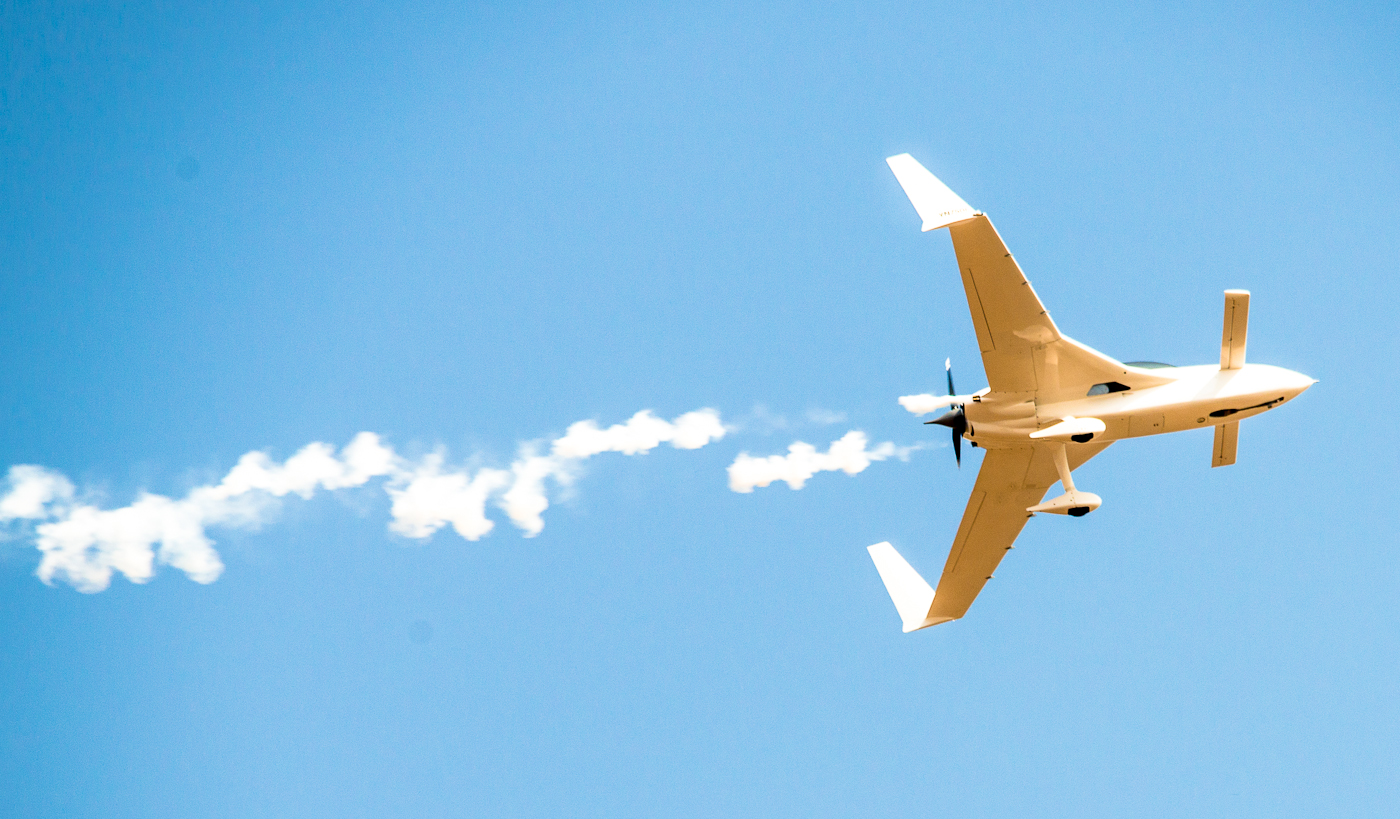
Aero India, Bangalore (2003)

The Long-EZ was a scaled-up redesign of the VariEze predecessor, allowing for the use of readily available Lycoming aircraft engines instead of the Volkswagen-derived engines or hard-to-find small Continentals for which the VariEze was designed. Changes from the VariEze included a larger main wing with modified Eppler 1230 airfoil and less sweep, larger strakes containing more fuel and baggage storage, and a slightly wider cabin. The canard uses the same GU25-5(11)8 airfoil as the VariEze. Plans were offered from 1980 to 1985. There were about 700 FAA-registered Long-EZs in the United States in 2005, which had grown to 833 in 2021.

In January 1985 it was announced that plans for a new canard were being offered, to eliminate "rain trim change" that had been experienced by Long-EZ pilots. This trim change is usually a nose-down trim change experienced when flying into rain requiring a small aft force on the stick to maintain altitude, which is easily trimmed out, using the bungee trim system. The new canard was designed with the Roncz R1145MS airfoil, which produces considerably more lift than the original GU25-5(11)8 airfoil. This enabled the new canard to be designed with less span, reducing wetted area and thus drag. The new canard has a negligible rain trim, and rain adds only 2 knots to the stall speed.

The aircraft is designed for fuel-efficient long-range flight, with a range of just over 2,000 miles (3,200 km). It can fly for over ten hours and up to 1,600 miles (2,600 km) on 52 U.S. gallons (200 liters) of fuel. Equipped with a rear-seat fuel tank, a Long-EZ flew for 4,800 miles (7,700 kilometers) in December 1979, still the record for aircraft weighing less than 1000 kg.

The pilot sits in a semi-reclined seat and controls the Long-EZ with a side-stick controller on the right-hand console. It has an airbrake on the underside, and the wing-tip rudders can be deflected outwards to act as auxiliary airbrakes.

In 1996 Burt Rutan awarded TERF Inc. the job of publishing the plans for the Long-EZ and other of his aircraft under The Rutan Aircraft Factory CD ROM Encyclopedia to further assist new builders and maintenance for existing builders. Some components for the design are supplied by Aircraft Spruce & Specialty.

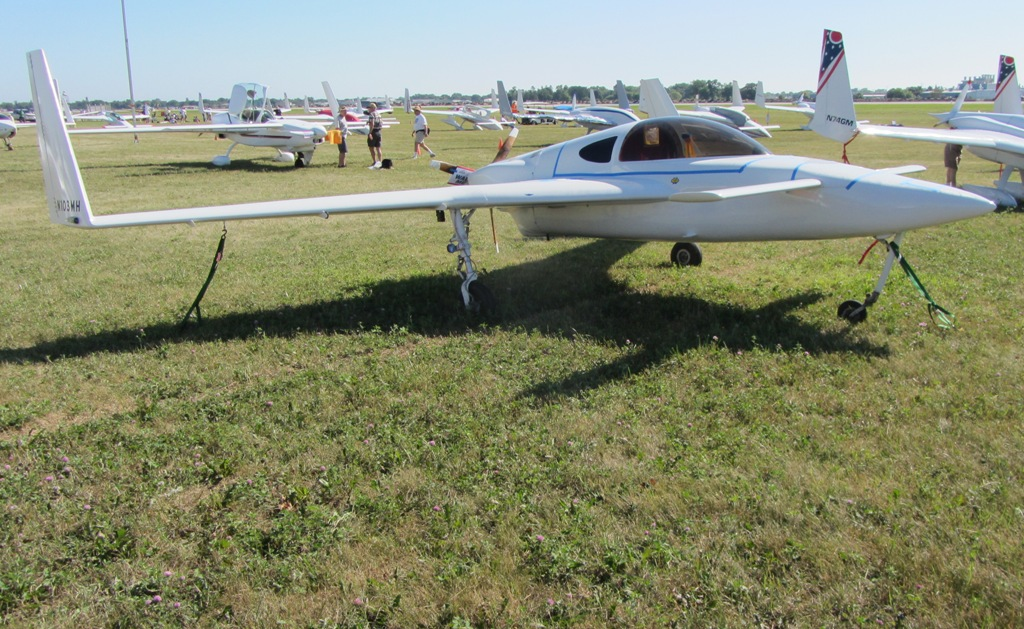
E-Racer

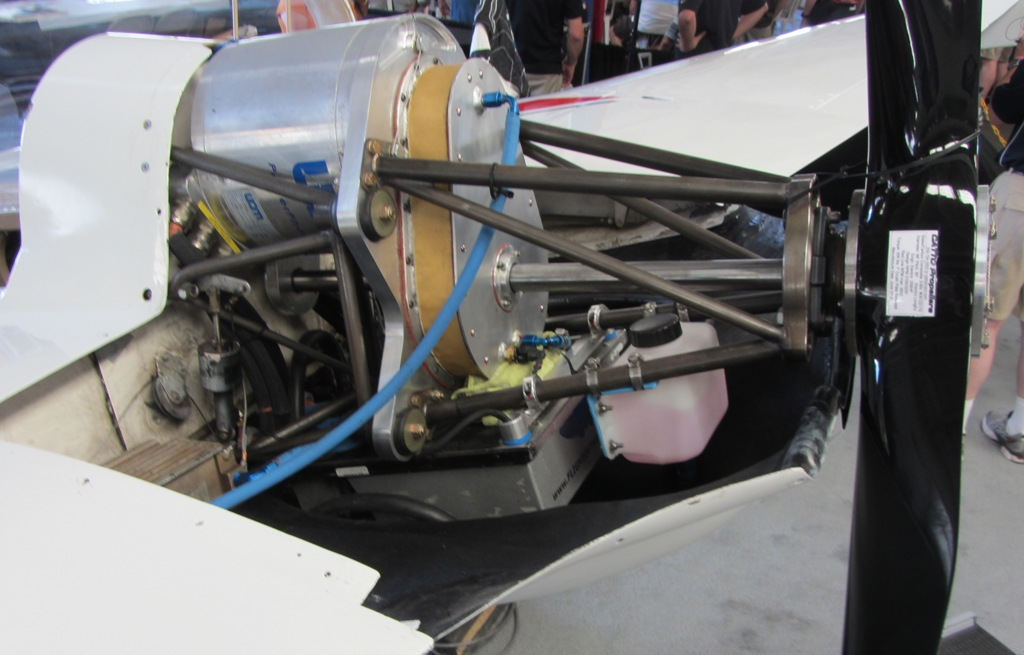
Experimental electric motor power installation

In 1997 Dick Rutan and Mike Melvill flew in convoy around the world in two Rutan Long-EZ aircraft that they had built. This "around the world in 80 nights" flight was called The Spirit of EAA Friendship World Tour, and some legs of it lasted for over 14 hours.

== Variants ==
E-Racer
An extensively modified redesign using Long-EZ wings with a fuselage modified for side-by-side seating, retractable landing gear, and larger automotive engine conversion powerplants.
EZ-rocket
XCOR Aerospace modified a Long-EZ and replaced the engine with twin liquid-fueled rocket engines to form a flight test vehicle called the EZ-rocket, which was used as a proof-of-concept demonstrator. Initially, a follow-on version called the "Mark-1 X-Racer, was going to be developed for the Rocket Racing League, but the Velocity SE was subsequently selected as the airframe for the Rocket Racer, rather than the Long-EZ.

Twin EZ
Ivan Shaw built a Long-EZ and then converted it into a "Twin-EZ", an aircraft with twin wing-mounted Norton NR642 Wankel engines (precursors to the MidWest AE series). Shaw, a Yorkshireman, later designed the Europa XS kitplane.

Long ESA
A 258 hp electric engine conversion. On 19 July 2012, pilot Chip Yates achieved 202.6 mph (326.1 km/h) in level flight, making the aircraft the fastest man carrying electric powered aircraft.
Berkez or Berk-EZ
Heavily modified Long-EZ with Berkut 360 components.

Wright Stagger-EZ

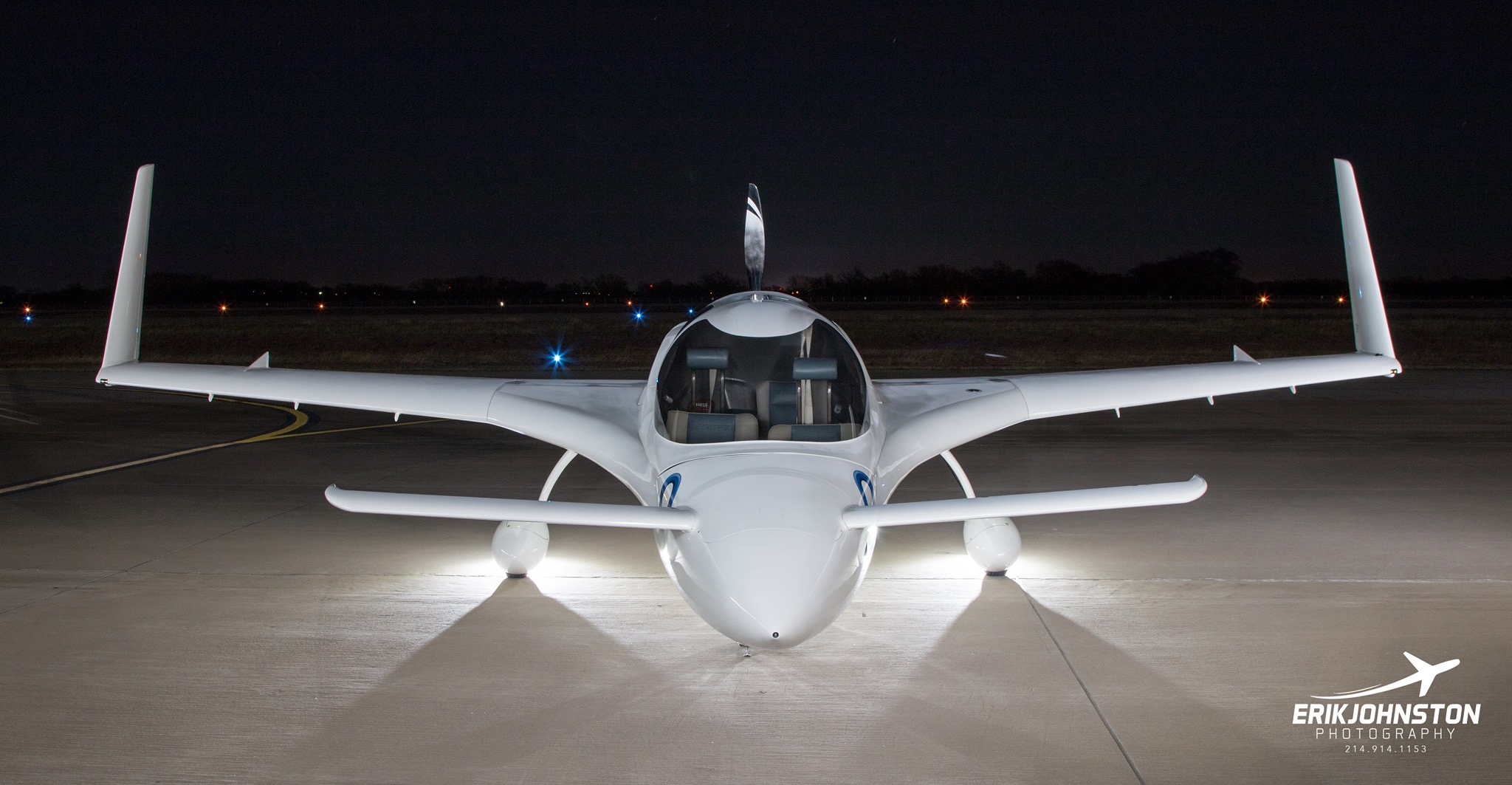
Wright Stagger EZ, a three-seat modification of the Rutan LongEZ.

A Steve Wright three-seater design, using standard Long-EZ wings but with a dihedral canard and a rounder, more capacious fuselage. The pilot seat is standard Long-EZ, the co-pilot seat is offset to the right and 13" rearward, and behind the pilot seat is a third seat for a passenger. The co-pilot has a control stick but no rudder pedals. Only one Stagger-EZ was built.

Long-distance EZ (G-WILY)
A standard Long-EZ modified by Bill Allen for long distance, with two wing droptanks for extra luggage and a large additional fuel tank in place of a passenger seat. Bill Allen also installed a Wilksch WAM diesel engine in one Long-EZ that he had built.

Borealis

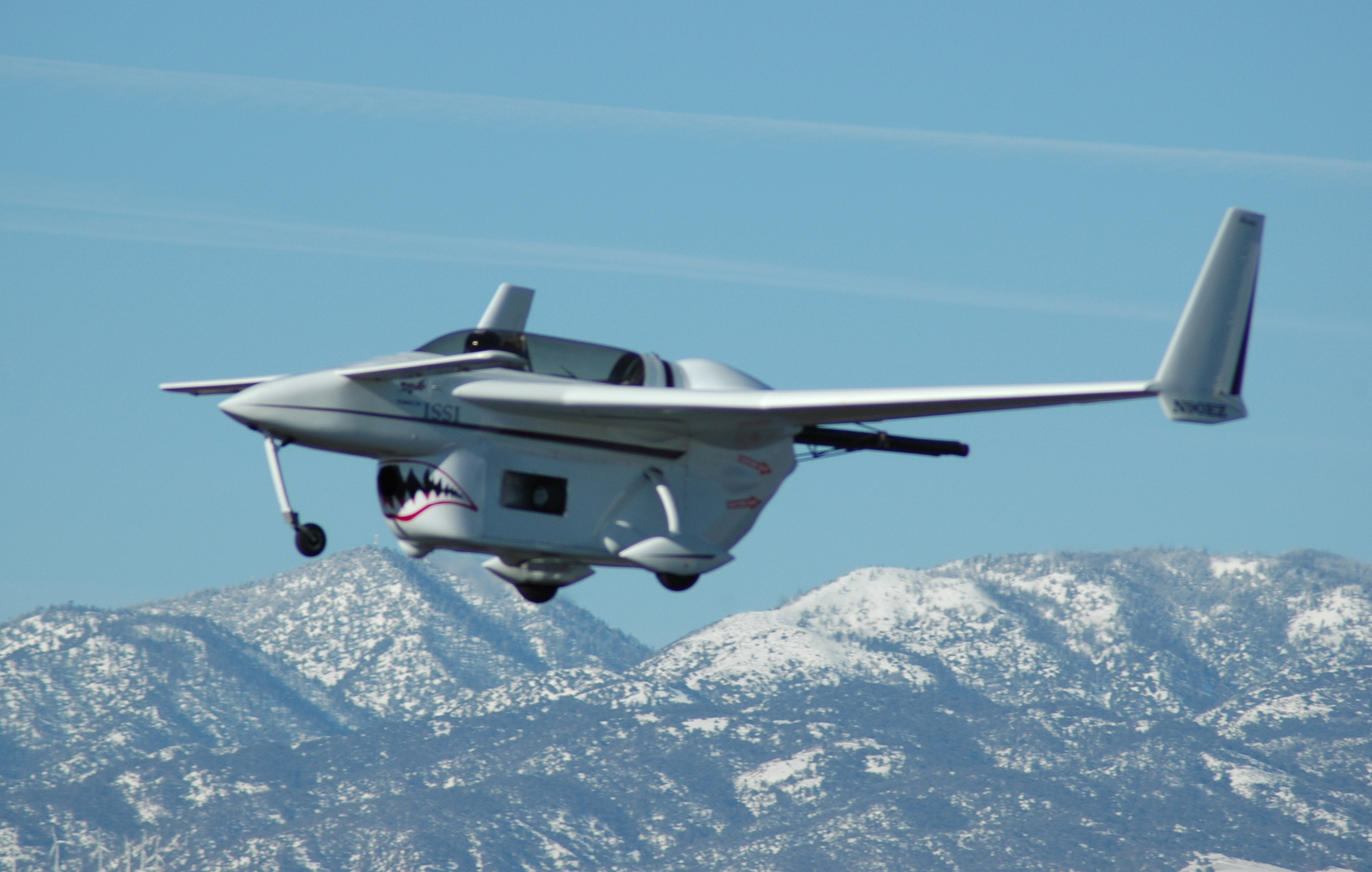
In-flight picture of the pulsed detonation powered Long-EZ, on January 31, 2008.

Powered by a pulse detonation engine. The project was developed by the Air Force Research Laboratory and Innovative Scientific Solutions, Inc.

== Specifications ==
Data from Jane's All The World's Aircraft 1982–83

General characteristics

- Crew: 1 pilot
- Capacity: 1 passenger
- Length: 16 ft 10 in (5.12 m)
- Wingspan: 26 ft 1 in (7.96 m)
- Height: 7 ft 10 in (2.40 m)
- Wing area: 81.99 sq ft (7.617 m^{2})
- Empty weight: 710 lb (322 kg)
- Max takeoff weight: 1,325 lb (601 kg)
- Fuel capacity: 52 US Gal (197 L)
- Powerplant: 1 × Lycoming O-235 air-cooled flat-four engine, 115 hp (86 kW)

Performance

- Maximum speed: 185 mph (298 km/h, 161 kn) (max cruise)
- Cruise speed: 144 mph (232 km/h, 125 kn) (40% power)
- Range: 2,010 mi (3,230 km, 1,750 nmi)
- Service ceiling: 27,000 ft (8,200 m)
- Rate of climb: 1,750 ft/min (8.9 m/s)

== Accidents and incidents ==
As of February 2023, 114 Long-EZ aircraft have been lost in crashes, with 44 fatalities.

- On February 28, 1990, Wallace Reid Jr. died after his Long-EZ crashed into the sea off Santa Monica after entering heavy fog.
- Singer-songwriter and actor John Denver died when his Long-EZ crashed on October 12, 1997, just off the coast at Pacific Grove, California. The NTSB believes that he inadvertently pushed on his right rudder pedal while twisting to the left in his seat as he struggled to operate the fuel selector valve, which on his aircraft had been moved by a previous owner to a position where it could more easily be reached from the passenger seat. Contributing factors in the crash were other pilot errors, a design that led to an overly optimistic pre-flight fuel-check estimate, a known defective fuel valve that was very hard to turn, and non-standard placement of the fuel selector valve by the plane's builder, at variance with Burt Rutan's specifications. Denver was aware of the relocated valve prior to take off and had previously flown the aircraft only for approximately thirty minutes in an orientation flight the day before the crash, although he was an experienced pilot. The NTSB cited Denver's unfamiliarity with the aircraft and his failure to have the aircraft refueled as causal factors in the crash. The aerodynamics of this unusual aircraft did not play a role in Denver's crash.
- On December 20, 1997, author James Gleick crash-landed his Long-EZ at Greenwood Lake Airport in West Milford, New Jersey. Gleick was on final approach when the aircraft's engine lost power and landed short of the runway against rising terrain. Probable causes of this accident were deemed to be terrain conditions and the failure of the pilot to use carburetor heat, which resulted in carburetor ice. Gleick was seriously injured while his passenger, his 8-year-old son Harry, was killed.

== See also ==
Related development

- Rutan VariEze

Aircraft of comparable role, configuration, and era

- Berkut 360
- Cirrus VK-30
- Cozy MK IV
- XCOR EZ-Rocket
