= Glassic SQ2000 =

American homebuilt aircraft

SQ2000

General information
- Type: Homebuilt aircraft
- National origin: United States
- Manufacturer: Glassic Composites LLC
- Status: Production completed
- Number built: 8

The Glassic SQ2000 (also written as SQ 2000 and SQ-2000) is an American homebuilt aircraft, designed and produced by Glassic Composites LLC of Sale Creek, Tennessee. When it was available the aircraft was supplied as a kit for amateur construction.

== Design and development ==
The SQ2000 features a cantilever mid-wing with tip rudders and a canard, a four-seat enclosed cabin accessed via doors, fixed or optionally retractable tricycle landing gear and a single engine in pusher configuration.

The aircraft is made from composites. Its 26.58 ft (8.1 m) span wing has a wing area of 104.0 sq ft (9.66 m^{2}). The cabin width is 48 in (120 cm). The acceptable power range is 160 to 260 hp (119 to 194 kW) and the standard engine used is the 200 hp (149 kW) Lycoming IO-360 powerplant.

Like many canard designs, the SQ2000 has runway length requirements comparable to heavier factory-built aircraft. The standard day, sea level take-off run is 1,600 ft (488 m), while the landing roll is 1,500 ft (457 m).

== Operational history ==
By 1998 the company reported that two kits had been sold and that one aircraft had been completed and was flying.

In December 2013 five examples were registered in the United States with the Federal Aviation Administration, although a total of eight had been registered at one time.

== Variants ==
SQ2000 XP
Retractable gear model. The SQ2000 XP has a typical empty weight of 1,200 lb (540 kg) and a gross weight of 2,250 lb (1,020 kg), giving a useful load of 1,050 lb (480 kg). With full fuel of 42 U.S. gallons (160 L; 35 imp gal) the payload for pilot, passengers and baggage is 798 lb (362 kg). The manufacturer estimated the construction time from the supplied kit as 700 hours.
SQ2000 ES
Fixed gear model, with oleo strut-mounted gear. The SQ2000 ES has a typical empty weight of 1,200 lb (540 kg) and a gross weight of 1,900 lb (860 kg), giving a useful load of 700 lb (320 kg). With full fuel of 39 U.S. gallons (150 L; 32 imp gal) the payload for pilot, passengers and baggage is 466 lb (211 kg). Other differences from the SQ2000 XP include a wing area of 100.0 sq ft (9.29 m^{2}) and a cruise speed of 225 mph (362 km/h). The manufacturer estimated the construction time from the supplied kit as 750 hours.

== Specifications (SQ2000 XP) ==
Data from AeroCrafter

General characteristics

- Crew: one
- Capacity: three passengers
- Length: 17 ft 6 in (5.33 m)
- Wingspan: 26 ft 7 in (8.10 m)
- Wing area: 104.00 sq ft (9.662 m^{2})
- Empty weight: 1,200 lb (544 kg)
- Gross weight: 2,250 lb (1,021 kg)
- Fuel capacity: 42 U.S. gallons (160 L; 35 imp gal)
- Powerplant: 1 × Lycoming O-360 four cylinder, air-cooled, four stroke aircraft engine, 200 hp (150 kW)

Performance

- Maximum speed: 260 mph (420 km/h, 230 kn)
- Cruise speed: 230 mph (370 km/h, 200 kn)
- Range: 851 mi (1,370 km, 739 nmi)
- Service ceiling: 25,000 ft (7,600 m)
- Rate of climb: 2,200 ft/min (11 m/s)
- Wing loading: 21.6 lb/sq ft (105 kg/m^{2})
