= Rutan Defiant =

Aircraft designed by Burt Rutan

Defiant
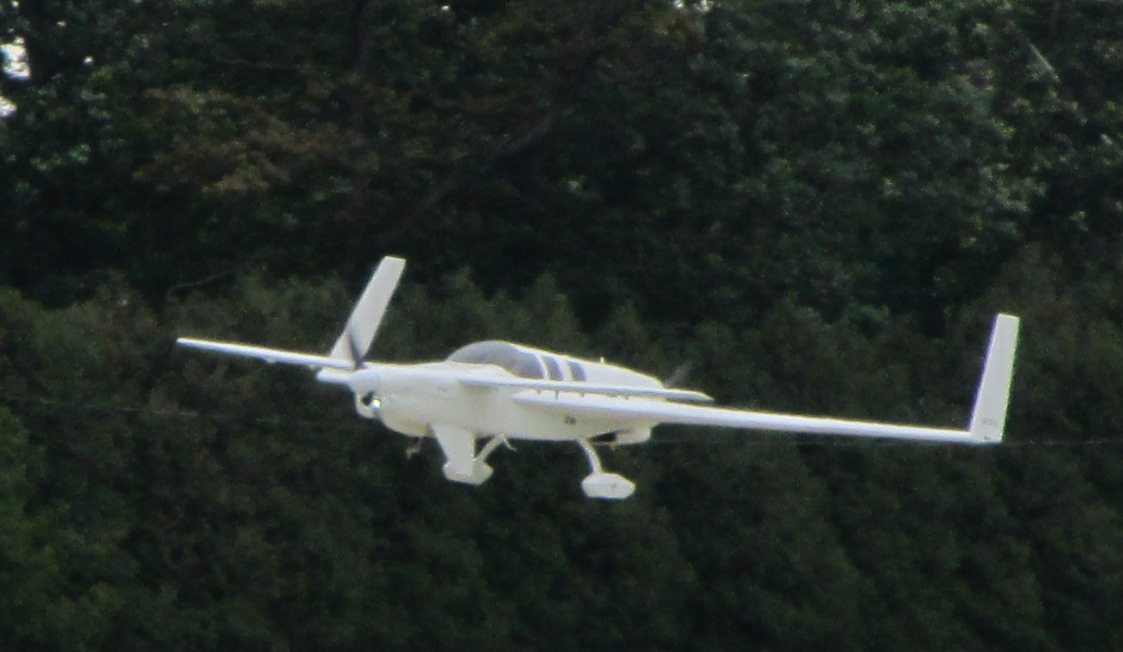
- Rutan Defiant

General information
- Type: Homebuilt aircraft
- National origin: America
- Manufacturer: Rutan Aircraft Factory
- Designer: Burt Rutan

History
- First flight: 30 June 1978

The Rutan Model 40 Defiant is a four-seat, twin-engine homebuilt aircraft with the engines in a push-pull configuration. It was designed by aerospace engineer Burt Rutan for the Rutan Aircraft Factory.

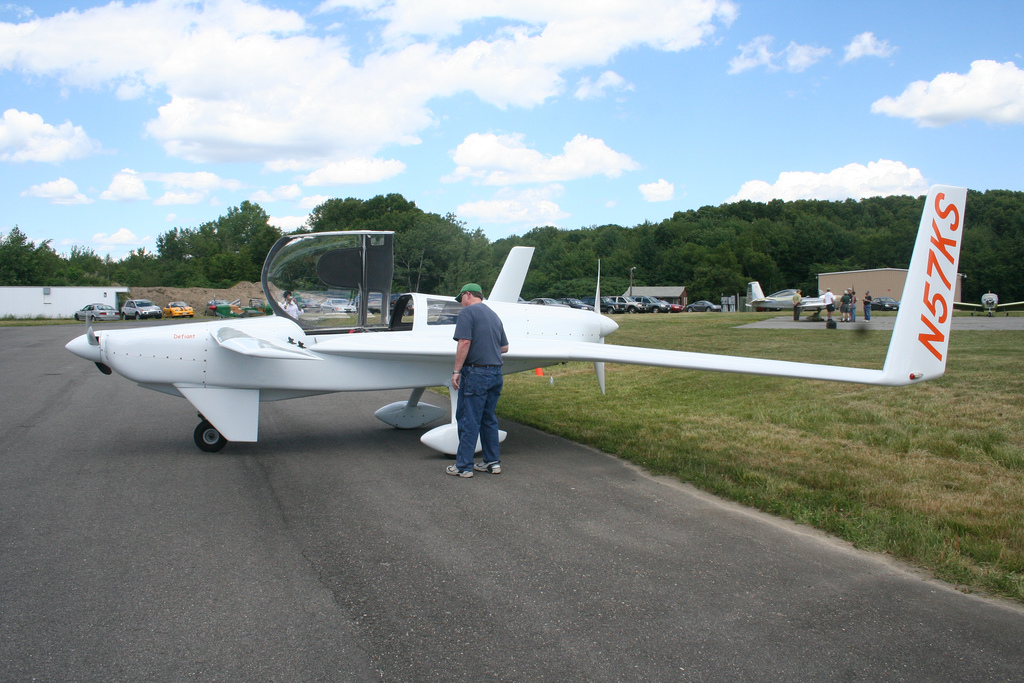
Rutan Defiant

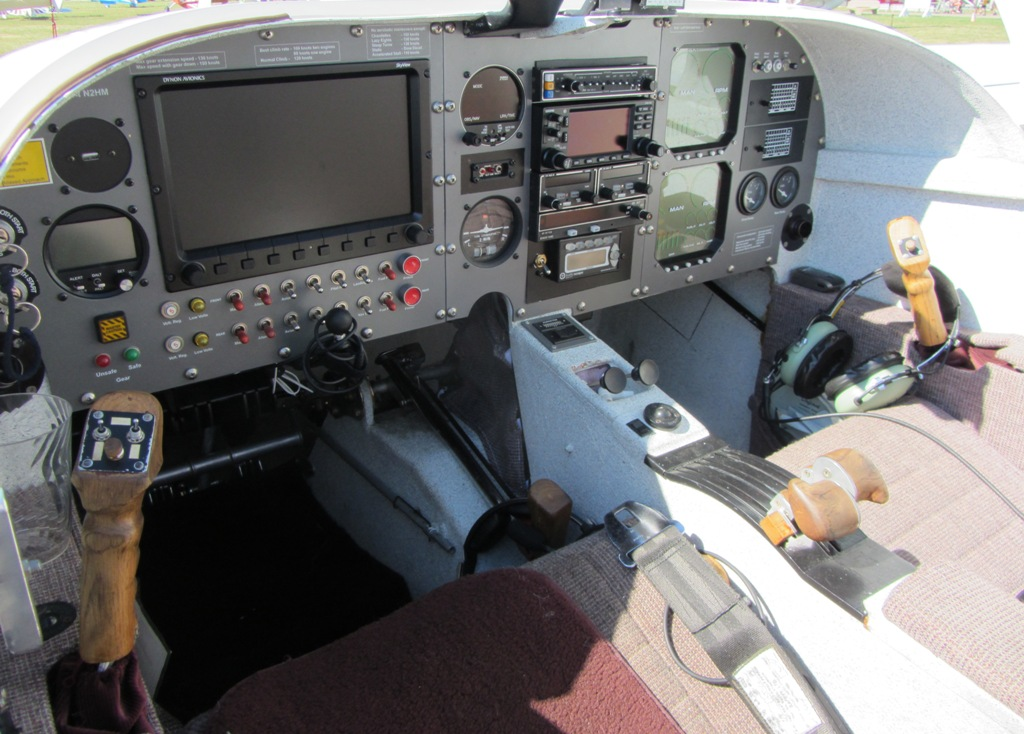
An updated Defiant instrument panel with Dynon Avionics Skyview Efis

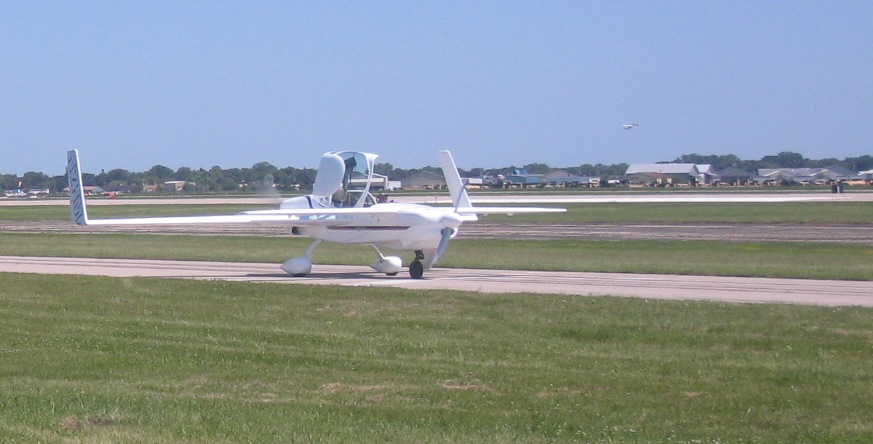
Defiant Taxi

== Development ==
The prototype Defiant, N78RA, was first flown on 30 June 1978. It had been intended as a proof-of-concept of a very safe light twin design, requiring little trim change and no pilot action in case of engine failure, and with good single engine performance. A comparison of the Defiant single engine climb rate with a Gulfstream Cougar had shown about 390 feet (120 m) vs 280 feet (85 m) per minute at low altitude with both aircraft in a clean, gear up and flaps up, configuration. The prototype is now owned by the Hiller Aviation Museum.

In 1979 the Rutan Aircraft Factory announced they would proceed with certification of a Defiant-based light twin. Adequate financing was not secured for this project, and the design was modified for homebuilt construction as the Model 74, with the second aircraft (built by Fred Keller) appearing at Oshkosh 1983. Plans were offered in mid-1984. 176 sets of plans were purchased before RAF discontinued selling plans in 1985. Nine examples were known to be flying as of mid-1987. Nineteen are registered with the FAA as of 2005.

== Design ==
The Defiant is built using fiberglass layup over polymeric foam core shapes in the same manner as the Rutan VariEze. The main gear is fixed, and there are no flaps. The Propellers are fixed-pitch non-feathering, which is unusual in a twin-engine design. Cockpit entry is through a side hinged canopy. The winglets provide yaw stability. Unusually, the Defiant has a ventral, port offset, forward mounted rudder, as can be seen in pictures of the plane taxiing.

== Specifications (Defiant) ==
General characteristics

- Crew: one, pilot
- Capacity: 3 passengers
- Length: 22 ft 10 in (6.95 m)
- Wingspan: 30 ft 9 in (9.4 m)
- Height: 9.33 ft (2.84 m)
- Wing area: 139.4 sq ft (12.95 m^{2})
- Empty weight: 1,701 lb (771.5 kg)
- Gross weight: 2,997 lb (1,360 kg)
- Max takeoff weight: 2,997 lb (1,360 kg)
- Fuel capacity: 120 gal
- Powerplant: 2 × Lycoming O-320 , 160 hp (119 kW) each

Performance

- Maximum speed: 188 kn (216 mph, 342 km/h)
- Cruise speed: 167 kn (192 mph, 309 km/h)
- Range: 980 nmi (1,130 mi, 1,808 km)
- Service ceiling: 18,000 ft (5,485 m)
- Rate of climb: 1,600 ft/min (8.1 m/s)
