= List of canard aircraft =

This is a list of canard aircraft, having a foreplane in front of the main wing instead of a conventional tailplane.

Type	Country	Class	Role	Date	Status	No.	Notes
AASI Jetcruzer	USA	Jet	Transport	1989	Prototype	5	Pusher configuration.
AEA June Bug	USA	Propeller	Experimental	1908	Prototype	1	
AeroCad AeroCanard	USA	Propeller	Private		Homebuilt	24	Pusher propeller.
ALR Piranha	Switzerland	Jet	Multi-role fighter	1980	Project	0	
Ambrosini SS.4	Italy	Propeller	Fighter	1939	Prototype	1	Pusher propeller.
ASL monoplane No.1	UK	Propeller	Experimental	1909	Prototype		Pusher propeller.
ASL monoplane No.2	UK	Propeller	Experimental	1910	Prototype		Pusher propeller.
ASL Valkyrie	UK	Propeller	Private	1910	Production	~11	Mid-engined pusher configuration, with propeller in front of wing. Several variants.
Atlas Cheetah	South Africa	Jet	Fighter	1986	Production	70	Modified Dassault Mirage III airframes. Several variants.
AV-8 MiniCAS	USA	Jet	Attack	1980s	Prototype	0	Proposal for a Close Air Support Harrier variant with shorter fuselage, V-tail, canards and squared air intakes.
Aviafiber Canard 2FL	Switzerland	Glider	Private	1978	Production		Foot-launched. The pilot was accommodated inside a fuselage and withdrew their legs through a hatch in the underside.
Avro 730	UK	Jet	Bomber	1957	Project	0	Mach 3 performance.
Avtek 400	USA	Propeller	Transport	1984	Prototype	1	Pusher configuration.
Beech Starship	USA	Propeller	Transport	1986	Production	53	Pusher configuration.
Beltrame Colibri	Italy	Propeller	Private	1938	Prototype	1	
Besson canard	France	Propeller	Private	1911	Prototype	1	
Berkut 360	USA	Propeller	Private	1989	Homebuilt	31	
Blériot V	France	Propeller	Experimental	1907	Prototype	1	Pusher configuration.
Chengdu J-9	China	Jet	Fighter	1975	Project	0	
Chengdu J-10	China	Jet	Fighter	1998	Production	468	
Chengdu J-20	China	Jet	Fighter	2011	Production	150	
Chudzik CC-1	France	Propeller	Private	1987	Prototype	1	
Cosy Classic	USA	Propeller	Private		Homebuilt		Variant of the Cozy III, Europeanised by Uli Wolter. The Çapar Mechanical Engineering company produced at least one example in Turkey.
Cozy	USA	Propeller	Private		Homebuilt		
Cozy III	USA	Propeller	Private	1982	Homebuilt		
Cozy MK IV	USA	Propeller	Private	1993	Homebuilt		
Curtiss-Wright XP-55 Ascender	USA	Propeller	Fighter	1943	Prototype	3	Pusher configuration.
Dassault Mirage III	France	Jet	Fighter	1981	Production		Variant with a small close-coupled canard.
Dassault Rafale	France	Jet	Fighter	1986	Production	201	
Diehl AeroNautical XTC Hydrolight	USA	Propeller	Amphibious Ultralight	1980s	Kit		
Dixon Nipper	UK	Propeller	Experimental	1911	Prototype	1	
e-Go	UK	Propeller	Private	2013	Prototype	1	
Eipper Lotus Microlight	USA	Propeller		1982			
English Electric P.10	UK	Jet	Reconnaissance	1950s	Prototype	0	Mixed turbojet/ramjet propulsion with telescopic wings.
Eurofighter Typhoon	International	Jet	Multi-role fighter	1994	Production	571	
Fabre Hydravion	France	Propeller	Experimental	1910	Prototype	1	First airworthy seaplane.
Focke-Wulf F 19	Germany	Propeller	Experimental	1927	Prototype	2	
Focke-Wulf Fw 42	Germany	Propeller	Bomber	1932	Project	0	Twin-engined.
Freedom Aviation Phoenix	USA	Propeller	Homebuilt	2007	Prototype	1	
Grumman X-29	USA	Jet	Experimental	1984	Prototype	2	Forward-Swept wing experimental aircraft.
Gyroflug Speed Canard	Germany	Propeller	Sports plane	1980	Production	62	
Hawker Siddeley P.1134	UK	Jet	Experimental	1959	Project	0	P.1134/2 variant.
IAI Kfir C2	Israel	Jet	Fighter	1974	Production	220+	Modified Dassault Mirage 5 airframes. Several variants.
IAI Lavi	Israel	Jet	Fighter	1986	Prototype	5	3 completed, 1 of which was later disassembled
Junqua Ibis	France	Propeller	Homebuilt	1991	Operational	11	
Kyūshū J7W1 Shinden	Japan	Propeller	Fighter	1945	Prototype	2	Pusher configuration.
Latécoère 225	France	Propeller	Ultralight Amphibious	1984	Prototype	1	Pusher configuration.
Lippisch Ente	Germany	Rocket	Experimental	1928	Prototype	1	First rocket powered aircraft.
Lockheed L-133	USA	Jet	Fighter	1942	Project	0	
MacCready Gossamer Condor	USA	Propeller	Experimental	1977	Operational	1	Human-powered aircraft.
MacCready Gossamer Albatross	USA	Propeller	Experimental	1979	Operational	1	Human-powered aircraft.
MacCready Gossamer Penguin	USA	Propeller	Experimental	1979	Operational	1	Solar-powered aircraft.
Messerschmitt P.1110 Ente	Germany	Jet	Fighter	1945	Project	0	Proposed for the Emergency Fighter Program
MiG-8 Utka	USSR	Propeller	Experimental	1945	Prototype	1	
North American A3J-1 Vigilante	USA	Jet	Attack	1958	Project	0	Proposal with variable geometery wings, free-floating apex and canards.
North American X-10	USA	Jet	Experimental	1953	Operational	13	
North American SM-64 Navaho	USA	UAV	Attack	1957	Production		Cruise missile.
North American XB-70 Valkyrie	USA	Jet	Bomber	1964	Prototype	2	Mach 3 performance, "waverider" wing.
Novi Avion	Yugoslavia	Jet	Multi-role	1991	Project		
OMAC Laser 300	USA	Propeller	Transport	1981		3	Pusher configuration.
O'Neill Pea Pod	USA	Propeller	Experimental	1962	Homebuilt	1	Did not fly.
Wren 460	Private	Propeller		2014	Production		
Piaggio P.180 Avanti	Italy	Propeller	Executive transport	1986	Production		
Pterodactyl Ascender	USA	Propeller		1980			Variant with a canard foreplane.
Qaher-313	Iran	Jet	Fighter	2013	Project		
Rockwell-MBB X-31	USA/Germany	Jet	Experimental	1990	Prototype	2	
Roe I Biplane	UK	Propeller	Experimental	1908	Prototype	1	
Royal Aircraft Factory S.E.1	UK	Propeller	Experimental	1911	Prototype	1	
Rutan Amsoil Racer	USA	Propeller	Experimental	1981	Prototype	1	
Rutan Defiant	USA	Propeller		1978			
Rutan Long-EZ	USA	Propeller		1979	Homebuilt		
Rutan Solitaire	USA	Glider		1982	Homebuilt		Self-launching motor glider.
Rutan VariEze	USA	Propeller	Private	1975	Homebuilt		
Rutan VariViggen	USA	Propeller	Private	1972	Homebuilt		
Rutan Voyager	USA	Propeller	Experimental	1986	Operational	1	Round-the-world special.
Saab 37 Viggen	Sweden	Jet	Fighter	1967	Production	329	
Saab JAS 39 Gripen	Sweden	Jet	Fighter	1988	Production	271	
Santos-Dumont 14-bis	France	Propeller	Experimental	1906	Prototype	1	
Scaled Composites ARES	USA	Jet	Experimental	1990	Prototype	1	
Shenyang J-15	China	Jet	Fighter	2009	Production	50	
Sukhoi Su-33	USSR	Jet	Fighter	1987	Production	33	
Sukhoi T-4	USSR	Jet	Bomber	1972	Prototype	4	Mach 3 performance.
Tupolev Tu-144	USSR	Jet	Transport	1968	Production		SST. Canard "moustache".
Sukhoi Su-34	Russia	Jet	fighter-bomber	1990	Production		
Sukhoi Su-30 MKI	Russia-India	Jet	Fighter	1989	Production		License-built variant of the Sukhoi Su-30.
Sukhoi Su-37	Russia	Jet	Fighter	1996	Prototype		
Sukhoi Su-47	Russia	Jet	Experimental	1997	Prototype		Main wing is forward-swept.
Velocity SE	USA	Propeller					
Velocity XL	USA	Propeller					
Archdeacon Glider	France	Glider	Experimental	1904	Prototype	1	
Voisin Canard	France	Propeller		1911			
Wright Glider	USA	Glider	Experimental	1902	Prototype	1	
Wright Flyer	USA	Propeller	Experimental	1903	Prototype	1	
Wright Stagger-Ez	USA	Propeller					Three-seat modification of the Rutan Long-EZ.
Boeing F-47	USA	Jet	Fighter		Prototype		

== See also ==
- Eurocanard
