= Avtek 400A =

Type of aircraft

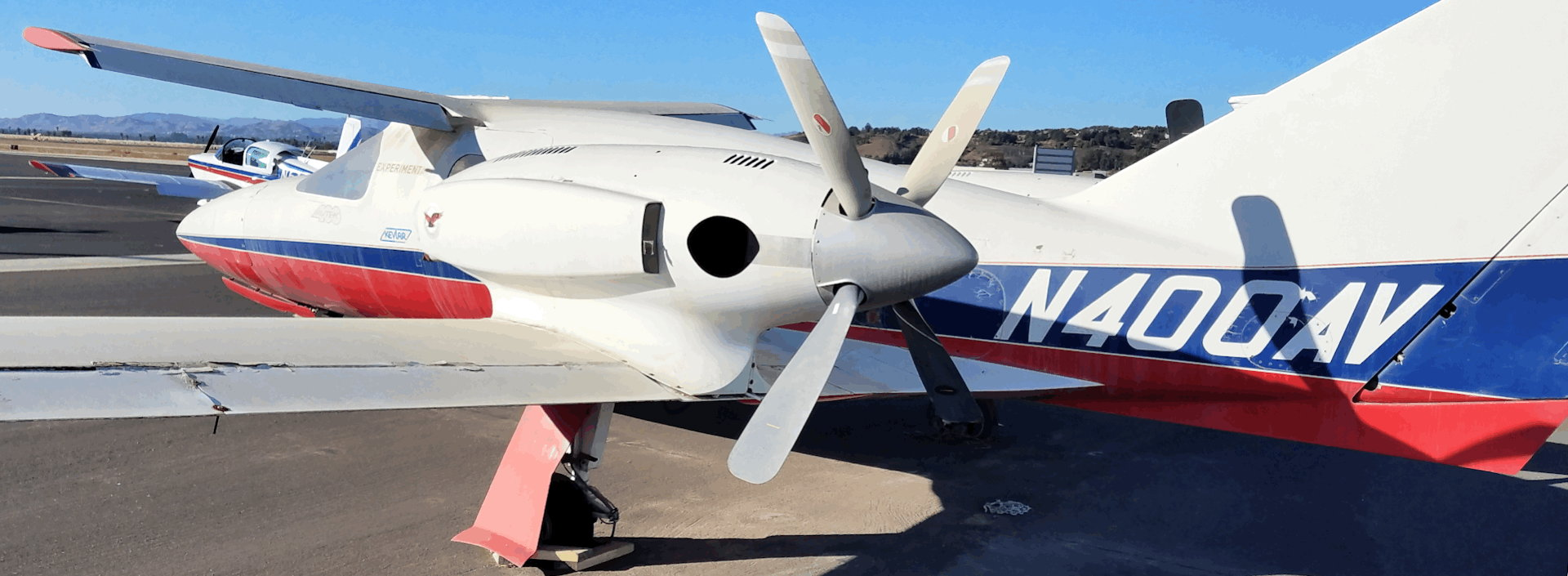
- Prototype At KCMA in 2019

General information
- Type: Business aircraft
- Manufacturer: Avtek
- Designer: Al Mooney
- Number built: 1

History
- First flight: September 17, 1984

The Avtek 400A is an American prototype turboprop-powered business aircraft, which was developed in the early 1980s. Its configuration was unusual and distinctive : a low-wing monoplane with two pusher engines mounted above the wings, and a large canard mounted atop the forward fuselage. The aircraft's sleek, futuristic design earned it a guest appearance on the Airwolf TV series as the X-400, which was used by the villain, Lou Stappleford in the Eagles episode.

The Avtek's structure made extensive use of advanced composite materials throughout.

In 1998, Avtek declared bankruptcy without the prototype having completed the testing required for US FAA type certification. The company's assets were purchased by AvtekAir, who as of 2004 planned to revive the project under the designation AvtekAir 9000T.

The only Avtek 400A constructed is currently owned by Evergreen Aviation & Space Museum, who are currently restoring the aircraft.

== Specifications (Avtek 400A pre-production prototype) ==
Data from Jane's All the World's Aircraft 1988-89

General characteristics

- Crew: 1
- Capacity: 5-9 passengers
- Length: 39 ft 4 in (11.99 m)
- Wingspan: 35 ft 0 in (10.67 m)
- Height: 11 ft 5 in (3.47 m)
- Wing area: 144 sq ft (13.4 m^{2}) inc. foreplane
- Airfoil: Avtek 12
- Empty weight: 3,779 lb (1,714 kg)
- Max takeoff weight: 6,499 lb (2,948 kg)
- Powerplant: 1 × Pratt & Whitney Canada PT6A-3L turboprop, 680 hp (507 kW) LH rotation
- Powerplant: 1 × Pratt & Whitney Canada PT6A-3R turboprop, 680 hp (507 kW) RH rotation
- Propellers: 4-bladed Hartzell constant-speed fully feathering pusher propellers, 6 ft 4 in (1.93 m) diameter

Performance

- Maximum speed: 255 kn (293 mph, 472 km/h)
- Cruise speed: 297 kn (342 mph, 550 km/h) at 10,000 ft (3,000 m)

364 kn (674 km/h; 419 mph) at 22,000 ft (6,700 m)
338 kn (626 km/h; 389 mph) at 41,000 ft (12,000 m)

- Stall speed: 83 kn (96 mph, 154 km/h)
- Range: 1,038 nmi (1,194 mi, 1,922 km) with NBAA/IFR reserves
- Service ceiling: 42,490 ft (12,950 m)
- Rate of climb: 4,630 ft/min (23.52 m/s)

== See also ==
Aircraft of comparable role, configuration, and era

- AAC Angel
- AASI Jetcruzer
- Adam A500
- Beechcraft Starship
- Embraer/FMA CBA 123 Vector
- LearAvia Lear Fan
- OMAC Laser 300
- Piaggio P.180 Avanti
