= Advanced Aerodynamics and Structures Inc. =

1980s-2004 aircraft manufacturer in United States

Advanced Aerodynamics & Structures Inc. (AASI)
- Company type: Public company (Incorporated)
- Industry: Aircraft manufacturer
- Founded: 1990
- Headquarters: Burbank, Long Beach, United States
- Number of employees: 85 (1998)

AASI or Advanced Aerodynamics and Structures Inc (originally ASI, Aerodynamics and Structures Inc.) was an aircraft maker, headquartered in Long Beach, California. The company was financed by US based Business Tycoon Late Hameed Hamza and co-owned by Darius Sharifzade and Huzefa H. to develop and manufacture a line of business aircraft of unconventional configuration, the Jetcruzer.

But the Jetcruzer program was later hampered by a lengthy development and although the prototype version (the 450) had flown as early as 1989, by 2002 AASI still did not have Jetcruzer in production. That year AASI acquired the assets of the Mooney Aircraft Company and changed its name to the Mooney Aerospace Group (MASG).

Shortly thereafter, MASG suspended development of the Jetcruzer to focus on Mooney's line of light aircraft. The Jetcruzer assets were put up for auction in November 2003 and sold to Innova Aircraft.

This was not enough to save the company and in 2004, MASG sold off the Mooney assets to Allen Holding Finance.

== History ==
Advanced Aerodynamics and Structures was founded in 1983 in Burbank, California, by Darius Sharifzadeh, an aeronautical engineer and airline pilot, to develop and produce a new generation of unconventional-looking business jets, the Jetcruzer. The future aircraft, similar in design to the Beechcraft Model 2000 Starship, was to be a monoplane with swept metal wings and a canard tail, with the turboprop engine driving the propeller located at the rear of a composite fuselage.

The Jetcruzer 450 prototype began flight testing in early 1989, when AASE became Advanced Aerodynamics and Structures Inc (AASI). Taiwanese industrialist Song Gen Yeh provided the necessary US$20 million, and Carl Chen, a former space specialist at Hughes, was appointed president. It soon became apparent that the unpressurized AASI Jetcruzer 450 was unlikely to find a place in the business jet market. It was therefore abandoned in favor of a more ambitious aircraft, the AASI Jetcruzer 500. Capable of carrying six passengers, it was announced at a price of US$900,000. By way of comparison, the Socata TBM-700, which was much more conventional for similar power and capacity, was then priced at $1.4 million.

AASI also announced the development of several similar aircraft:

- the AASI Jetcruzer 650, a twin-engine aircraft for 13 passengers priced at $3 million;
- the AASI Stratocruzer 1250, advertised as a business jet with intercontinental range;
- the Freedom DS-888, a cargo aircraft priced at $1.3 million.

Recapitalized after going public in December 1996, AASI invested $35 million to build a factory in Long Beach, California, specializing in the development and mass production of the Jetcruzer 500, manufacturing all the necessary equipment itself.

In 2000, AASI announced an order book of 188 aircraft, worth $226 million, with the base price rising to $1.6 million, and employed 120 people, former employees of Northrop Grumman, Lockheed Martin, and Boeing.

However, series production had not yet begun, as the program was suffering from continual delays, largely due to the difficulty of effectively cooling an engine located at the rear of the aircraft. In January 2001, Carl Chen left AASI. He was replaced by Roy H. Norris, former president of Raytheon Aircraft Company. The Jetcruzer program had already cost $70 million, and AASI's stock listing was suspended in April 2001. Twenty years of work had failed to produce a marketable aircraft.

Roy Norris believed that the time had come for a consolidation of the general aviation industry. In February 2002, he announced the acquisition of Mooney Aircraft Company for $11 million. Once the acquisition was complete, AASI was renamed Mooney Aerospace Group (MASG), with the Mooney name being a benchmark in the light aviation sector and the AASI logo shared with other organizations. 70% of MASG's capital was controlled by a New York financial group, LH Financial.

When he took over as head of MASG, Roy Norris estimated that the Jetcruzer 500 program would need another 18 months to achieve certification. But new technical problems delayed development: excessive noise levels, poorly calculated center of gravity, etc. Mooney therefore announced the discontinuation of the program and the return of $1.6 million of the $10 million in advance payments made by customers. It was time to refocus on the traditional Mooney range and make savings: the AASI factory in Long Beach was converted into a service station for Mooney aircraft users on the west coast. The computerized production equipment, deemed unsuitable for the construction of single-engine touring aircraft, was sold. The Mooney catalog saw prices drop by 20% to stimulate sales and, in a further effort to reduce costs, a direct sales network was organized outside of the usual dealers.

In August 2002, Roy Norris gave up on turning around a company that was only building 28 aircraft per year, compared to around 100 at the end of the 1990s. He was replaced by Peter Larson, former CFO of Cessna.

In November 2003, the Jetcruzer program was put up for auction, and in February 2004, Innova Aircraft purchased the tooling, production rights, and all technical documentation with the intention of continuing the program. However, this sale came too late. In May 2004, MASG sold Mooney Airplane Company to Allen Holding Finance and filed for bankruptcy on June 10.

== Aircraft ==
- Jetcruzer 450
- Jetcruzer 500
- Jetcruzer 650 (proposed only)
- Stratocruzer 1250 (proposed only)
