= LearAvia Lear Fan =

Innovative concept jet

Lear Fan 2100
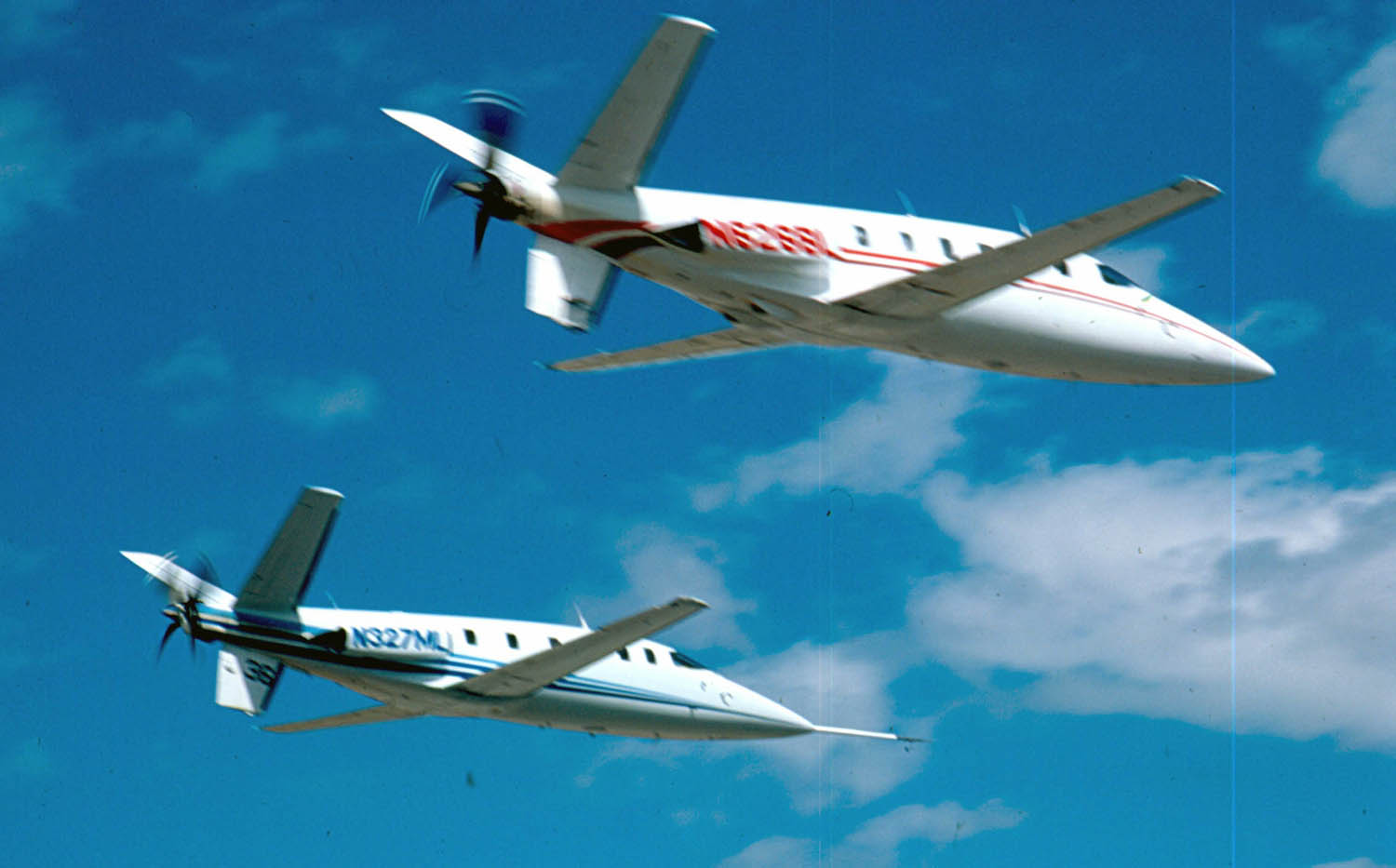
- Two Lear Fans during a 1982 display flight

General information
- Type: Business aircraft
- National origin: United States of America
- Manufacturer: LearAvia
- Designer: Bill Lear
- Number built: 3

History
- First flight: January 1, 1981

The LearAvia Lear Fan 2100 was a turboprop business aircraft designed in the 1970s, with an unusual configuration. The Lear Fan never entered production.

== Design and development ==
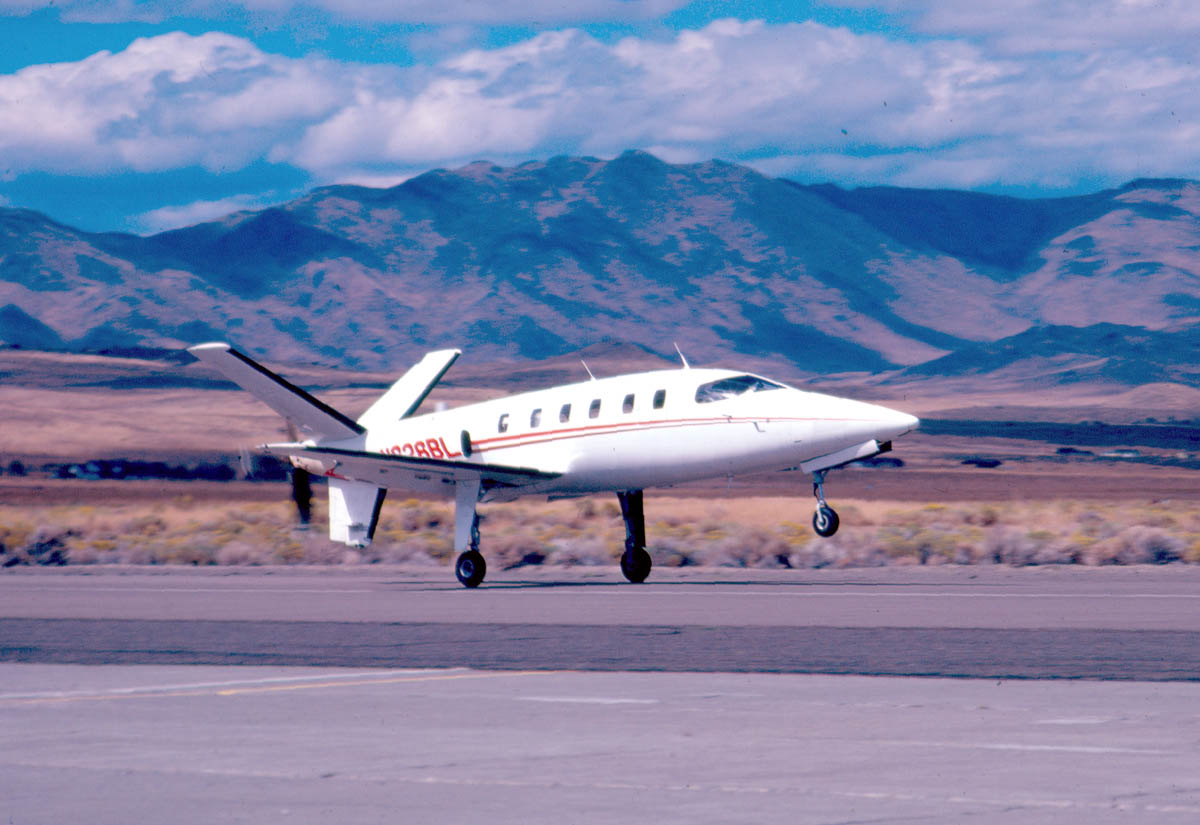
A Lear Fan prototype landing

The Lear Fan was designed by Bill Lear, but not completed before his death in 1978. It was planned for production to be carried out in Belfast, Northern Ireland, in a new factory built with money from the British Government in an effort to boost employment. The aircraft had a pressurized cabin and was designed for a service ceiling of 41,000 ft (12,500 m). It could accommodate two pilots and seven passengers, or one pilot and eight passengers.

It featured a pusher configuration in which two engines powered a single constant-speed three- or four-bladed propeller at the rear of the aircraft. A purpose-built gearbox allowed two Pratt & Whitney Canada PT6B turboshaft engines to supply power via two independent driveshafts. The intent of the design was to provide the safety of multi-engine reliability, combined with single-engine handling in case of failure of one of the engines.

The aircraft was made of lightweight composite materials instead of the more common aluminium alloy.

Another distinctive feature was the Y-shaped empennage. Two stabilizers pointed upward at an angle, similar to those on a V-tail aircraft, and a short vertical stabilizer pointed downward. However, unlike conventional V-tails, there was no pitch/yaw control mixing on the Lear Fan. The downward-pointing rudder also served to protect the propeller from ground strikes during takeoff and landing.

== Operational history ==
After the cancellation of a planned test flight on December 31, 1980 due to technical issues, the first prototype made its maiden flight on January 1, 1981, a date officially recorded by sympathetic British government officials as "December 32, 1980" in order to secure funding that expired at the end of 1980.

The Lear Fan, however, did not enter production. Structural problems were discovered during the pressurization of the all-composite fuselage. The US Federal Aviation Administration refused to issue the prototype with an airworthiness certificate because of concerns that, despite having two engines, the combining-gearbox that drove the single propeller was not adequately reliable. Development was abandoned in 1985 after only three aircraft were built.

== Surviving aircraft ==
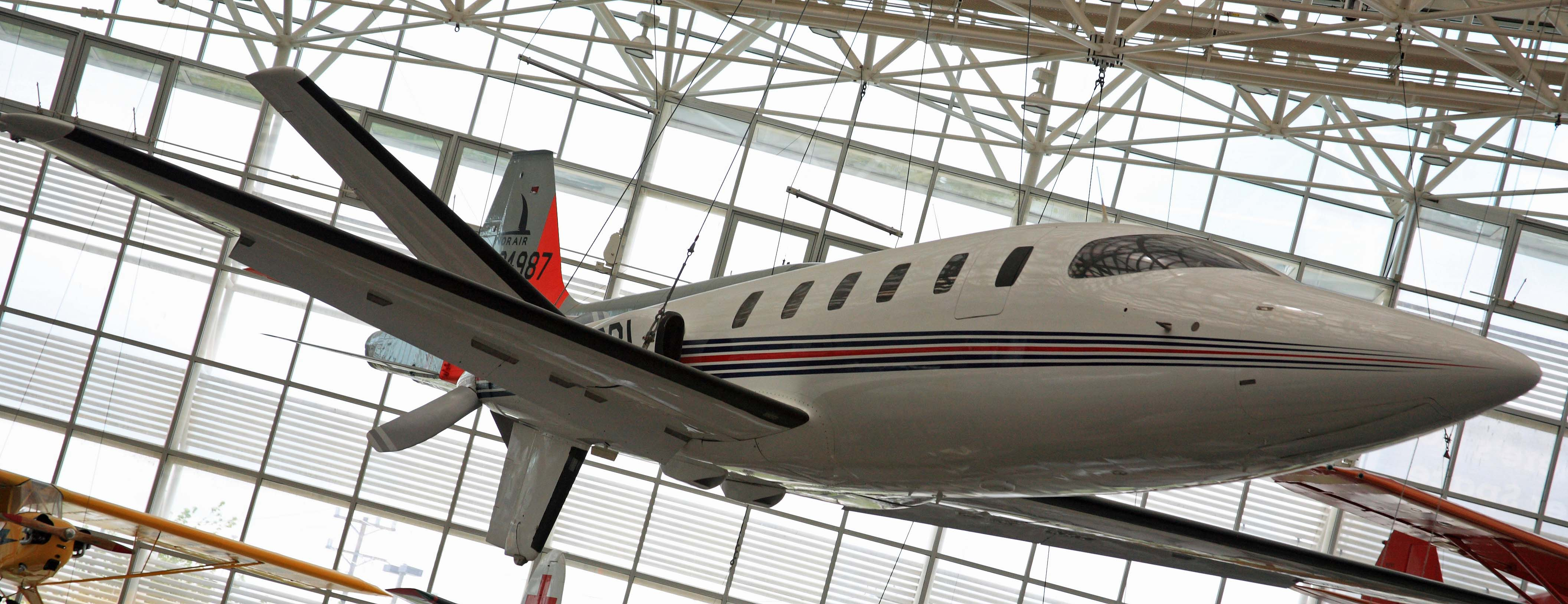
Lear Fan 2100 prototype on display at the Museum of Flight

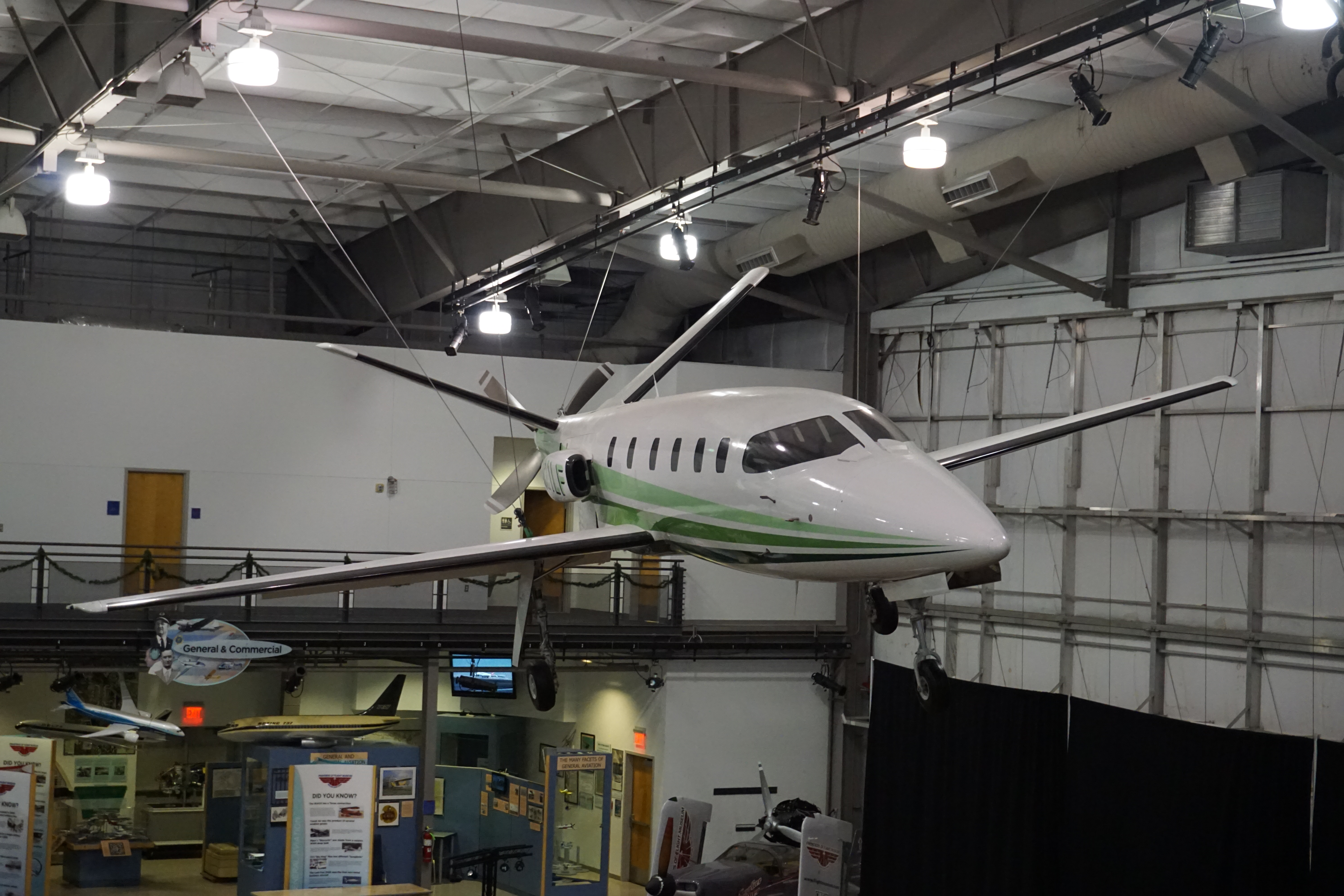
A Lear Fan 2100 on display at the Frontiers of Flight Museum

All three Lear Fan aircraft have been preserved. They are on display at the Museum of Flight in Seattle, Washington, the Frontiers of Flight Museum in Dallas, Texas, and on static display in front of the Civil Aerospace Medical Institute in Oklahoma City, Oklahoma.

== Specifications ==
Data from Jane's All The World's Aircraft 1982–83

General characteristics

- Crew: Two (pilot and copilot)
- Capacity: Six passengers
- Length: 40 ft 7 in (12.37 m)
- Wingspan: 39 ft 4 in (11.99 m)
- Height: 12 ft 2 in (3.71 m)
- Wing area: 162.9 sq ft (15.13 m^{2})
- Aspect ratio: 9.5
- Empty weight: 4,100 lb (1,860 kg)
- Max takeoff weight: 7,350 lb (3,334 kg)
- Powerplant: 2 × Pratt & Whitney (Canada) PT6B-35F turboprops, 650 shp (480 kW) each

Performance

- Maximum speed: 450 mph (720 km/h, 390 kn) at 25,000 feet (7,600 m)
- Cruise speed: 322 mph (518 km/h, 280 kn) at 40,000 feet (12,000 m) economy cruise
- Stall speed: 88 mph (142 km/h, 76 kn) with flaps down and power off
- Range: 1,783 mi (2,869 km, 1,549 nmi)
- Service ceiling: 41,000 ft (12,500 m)
- Rate of climb: 3,450 ft/min (17.5 m/s)

== See also ==
Aircraft of comparable role, configuration, and era

- AASI Jetcruzer
- Adam A500
- Beechcraft Starship
- Cirrus VK-30
- OMAC Laser 300
- Piaggio P.180 Avanti
