= Avtek =

American aircraft manufacturer

- Type: Private
- Industry: Aerospace
- Founded: 1982
- Founders: Robert Adickes; Robert Honeycutt; Quinten Ward
- Fate: Filed for bankruptcy in 1998
- Successor: AvtekAir
- Headquarters: Camarillo, California, United States
- Area served: United States, Europe
- Products: Avtek 400 (business aircraft)

Avtek was a U.S. aircraft manufacturer established at Camarillo, California in 1982 by Robert Adickes, Robert Honeycutt and Quinten Ward with the intention of producing a business aircraft of composite construction, the Avtek 400. Foreign investment was obtained from firms in Denmark, Finland, Germany, and Japan.

== History ==
In 1991, a European subsidiary, EuroAvtek, was formed, jointly owned by Avtek, Per Udsen, and the government of Denmark, to oversee sales and marketing on the continent. Avtek filed for bankruptcy in 1998 without achieving type certification for the prototype. Its assets were purchased by Ward personally, who then formed the AvtekAir corporation to continue development.
