= Canard (aeronautics) =

Aircraft configuration in which a small wing is placed in front of the main wing

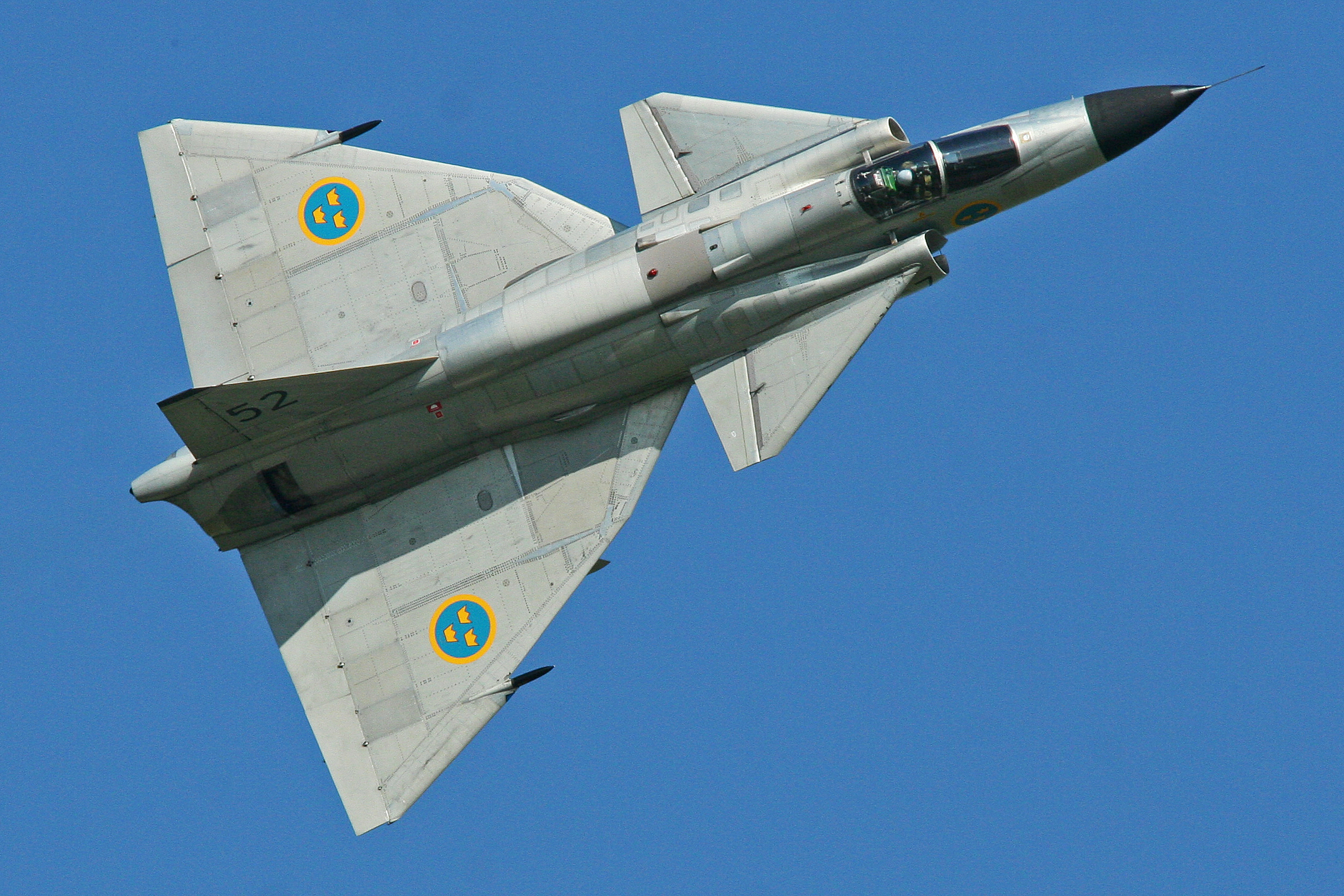
A Saab 37 Viggen, the first modern canard aircraft to go into production

In aeronautics, a canard (French for duck) is a wing configuration in which a small forewing or foreplane is placed forward of the main wing of a fixed-wing aircraft or a weapon. The term "canard" may be used to describe the aircraft itself, the wing configuration, or the foreplane. Canard wings are also extensively used in guided missiles and smart bombs.

The term "canard" arose from the appearance of the Santos-Dumont 14-bis of 1906, which was said to be reminiscent of a duck (canard in French) with its neck stretched out in flight.

Despite the use of a canard surface on the first powered aeroplane, the Wright Flyer of 1903, canard designs were not built in quantity until the appearance of the Saab Viggen jet fighter in 1967. The aerodynamics of the canard configuration are complex and require careful analysis.

Rather than use the conventional tailplane configuration found on most aircraft, an aircraft designer may adopt the canard configuration to reduce the main wing loading, to better control the main wing airflow, or to increase the aircraft's manoeuvrability, especially at high angles of attack or during a stall. Canard foreplanes, whether used in a canard or three-surface configuration, have important consequences for the aircraft's longitudinal equilibrium, static and dynamic stability characteristics.

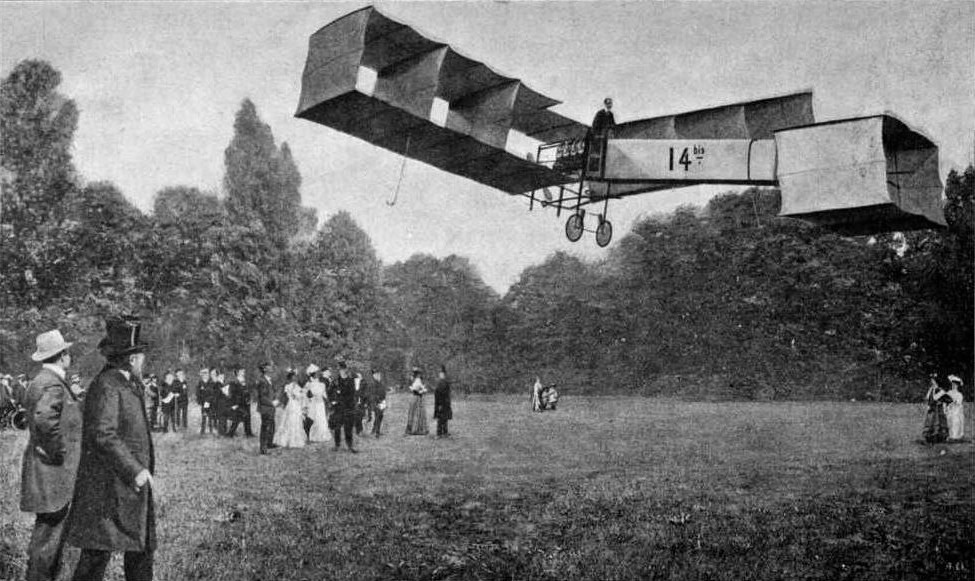
The 1906 Santos-Dumont 14-bis

== History ==
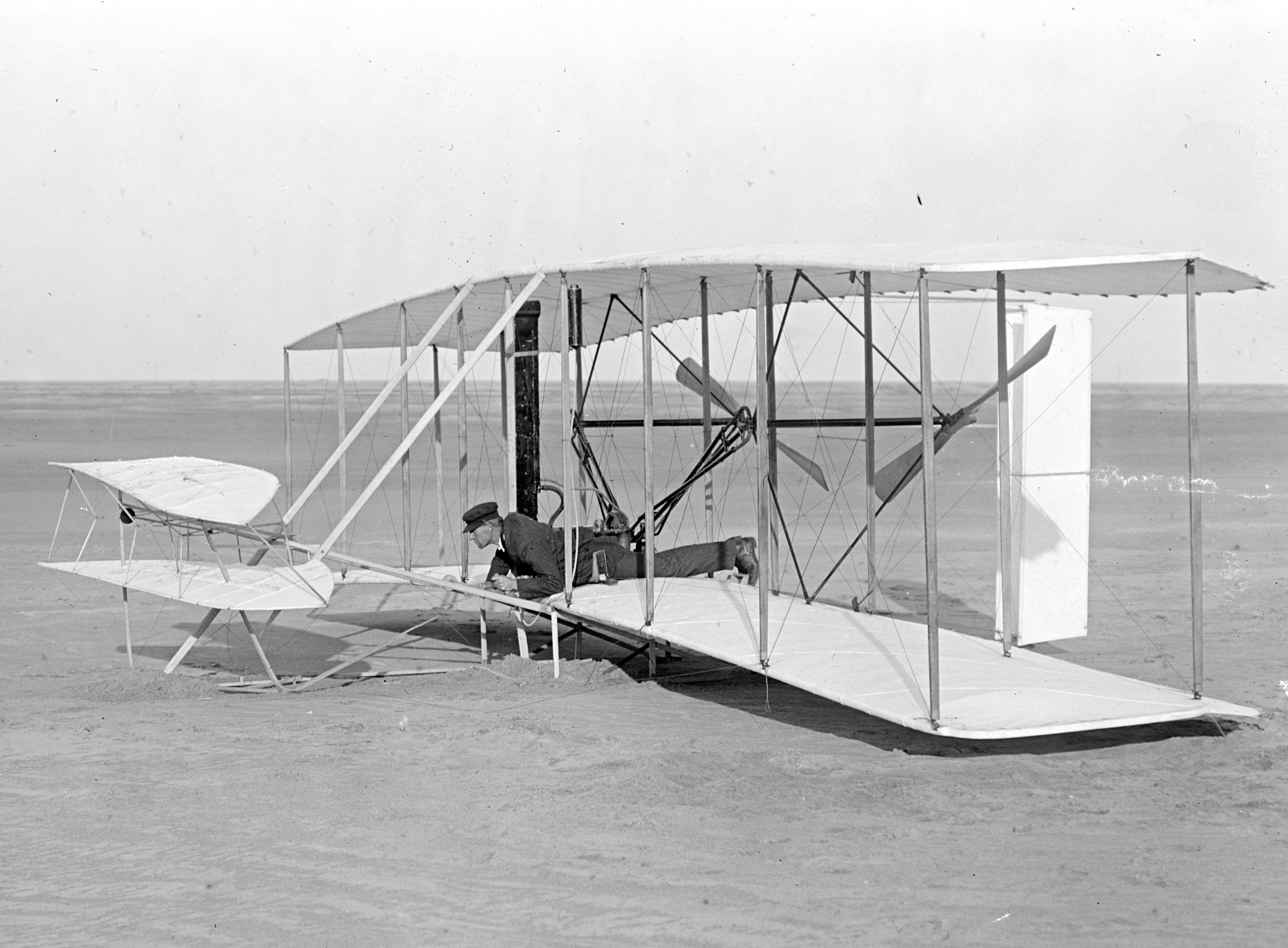
The Wright Flyer of 1903 was a canard biplane

=== Early Use/Overview ===
During the time period between the Wright Flyer and the SAAB Viggen, canards were largely ignored. Early canards faced issues related to stability and control and were notorious for stalling. The Wright Brothers experimented with canards on the Wright Flyer in hopes of making crashes safer, their reasoning being that in a stall or loss of lift, the nose would pitch downward, protecting the pilot. However, this made the Wright Flyer unstable in pitch. Additionally, there lacked a proper design process as a result of their novelty, leading to them being shelved in favor of traditional tail-aft configurations for the first half of the 20th century. However, more current demands in the field of aerospace have sparked their resurgence due to perceived enhancements in maneuverability, performance in wide velocity spectrums, and newly available materials and technologies such as fly-by-wire that make their incorporation more plausible.

=== Pioneer years ===
The Wright Brothers began experimenting with the foreplane configuration around 1900. Their first kite included a front surface for pitch control and they adopted this configuration for their first Flyer. They were suspicious of the aft tail because Otto Lilienthal had been killed in a glider with one. The Wrights realised that a foreplane would tend to destabilise an aeroplane but expected it to be a better control surface, in addition to being visible to the pilot in flight. They believed it impossible to provide both control and stability in a single design, and opted for control.

Many pioneers initially followed the Wrights' lead. For example, the Santos-Dumont 14-bis aeroplane of 1906 had no "tail", but a box kite-like set of control surfaces in the front, pivoting on a universal joint on the fuselage's extreme nose. This was intended to provide both yaw and pitch control. The Fabre Hydravion of 1910 was the first floatplane to fly and had a foreplane.

But canard behaviour was not properly understood and other European pioneers—among them, Louis Blériot—were establishing the tailplane as the safer and more "conventional" design. Some, including the Wrights, experimented with both fore and aft planes on the same aircraft, now known as the three surface configuration.

After 1911, few canard types would be produced for many decades. In 1914 W.E. Evans commented that "the Canard type model has practically received its death-blow so far as scientific models are concerned."

=== 1914 to 1945 ===
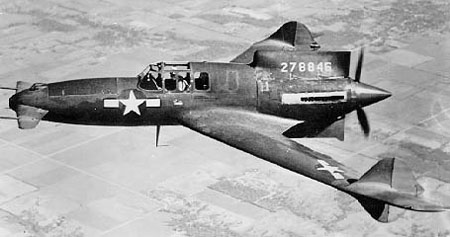
Curtiss-Wright XP-55 Ascender

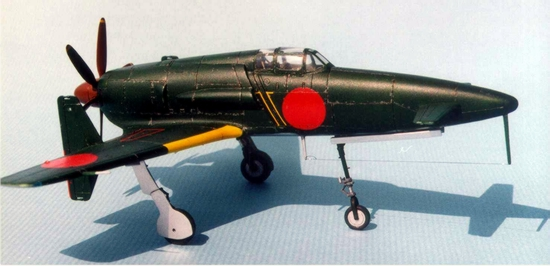
The Kyūshū J7W1 Shinden (scale model)

Experiments continued sporadically for several decades.

In 1917, de Bruyère constructed his C 1 biplane fighter, having a canard foreplane and rear-mounted pusher propeller. The C 1 was a failure.

First flown in 1927, the experimental Focke-Wulf F 19 "Ente" (duck) was more successful. Two examples were built and one of them continued flying until 1931.

Immediately before and during World War II, several experimental canard fighters were flown, including the Ambrosini SS.4, Curtiss-Wright XP-55 Ascender and Kyūshū J7W1 Shinden. These were attempts at using the canard configuration to give advantages in areas such as performance, armament disposition or pilot view. Ultimately, no production aircraft were completed. The Shinden was ordered into production "off the drawing board" but only prototypes had flown by the time the war ended.

In 1945 in Europe, what may have been the first canard designed and flown in the Soviet Union appeared as a test aircraft, the experimental Mikoyan-Gurevich MiG-8 Utka (Russian for "duck"), a lightweight propeller aircraft. It was noted for its docile slow-speed handling characteristics and flew for some years, being used as a testbed during development of the swept wing of the (conventional layout) MiG-15 jet fighter.

=== Canard revival ===
Since understanding of aerodynamics was far more limited in the 20th century than in the present day, canards demonstrated supposed "unpredictable stability", leading to a traditional tail-aft design to be favored for most applications. Specifically, early applications demonstrated "longitudinal instability" where the center of lift was too far forward. Additionally, stalling of the foreplane could cause sudden drops and loss of control. However, there was a radical shift from guesswork to rigorous aerodynamic science as the century progressed. By the 1970s and 1980s, new technologies such as CFD and fly-by-wire were developed, demonstrating the potential to compensate for canards' drawbacks. For applications in fighter aircraft, it was demonstrated that these systems could not just eliminate drawbacks, but enable canards to enhance maneuverability and agility. This culminated in the production of the SAAB Viggen as one of the first successful modern canard-equipped jets [6]. After the Viggen demonstrated that the drawbacks of canards were largely compensated for, enabling them to provide excellent performance and agility, the precedent was set for later fighters such as the Eurofighter Typhoon and Dassault Rafale to adopt canards in later decades. Manufacturers were convinced to adopt canards not only from the Viggen's demonstration, but also from modern analysis showing these designs having improved lift-to-drag ratios and enhanced maneuverability.

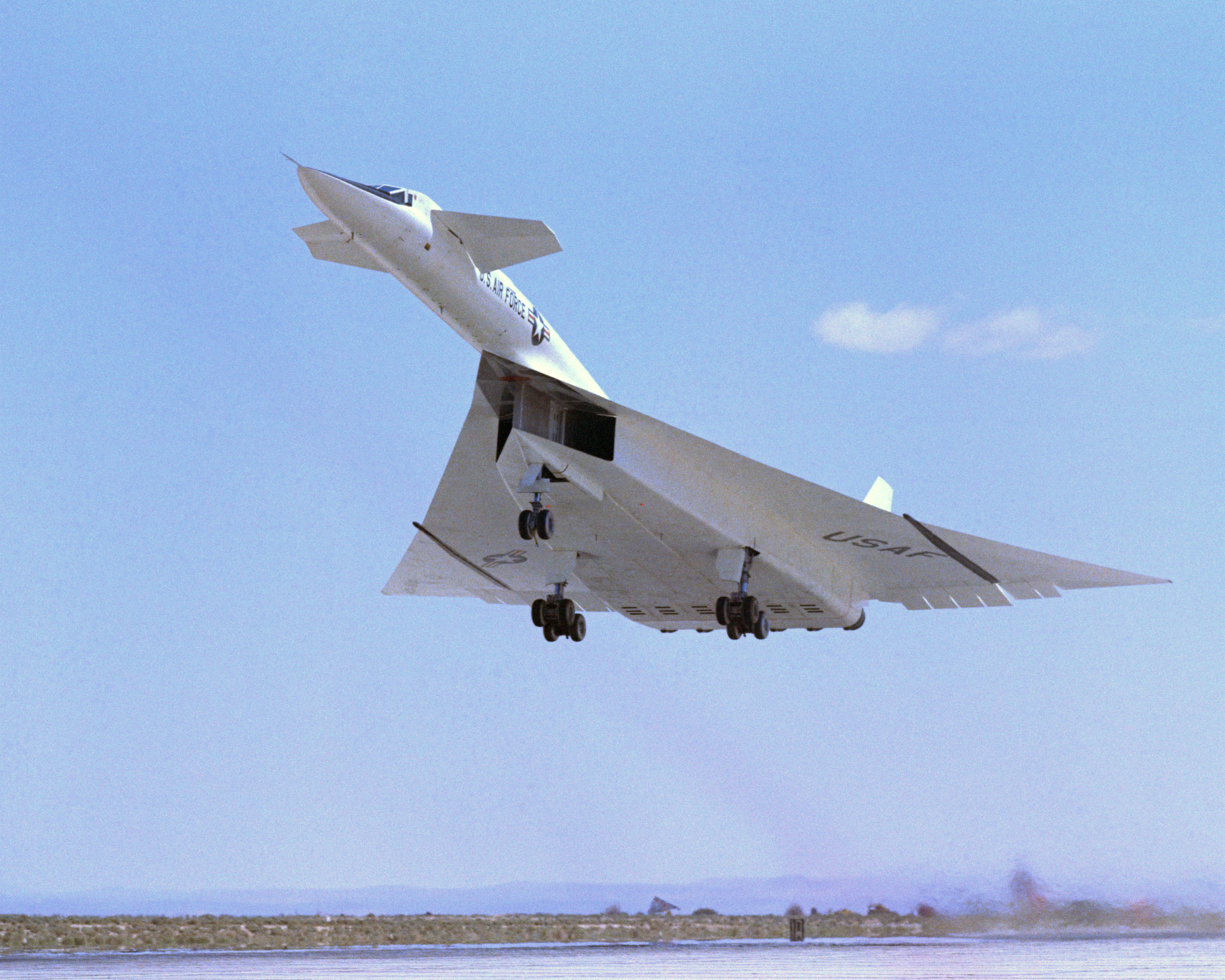
XB-70 Valkyrie experimental bomber

With the arrival of the jet age and supersonic flight, American designers, notably North American Aviation, began to experiment with supersonic canard delta designs, with some such as the North American XB-70 Valkyrie and the Soviet equivalent Sukhoi T-4 flying in prototype form. But the stability and control problems encountered prevented widespread adoption.

In 1963 the Swedish company Saab patented a delta-winged design which overcame the earlier problems, in what has become known as the close-coupled canard. It was built as the Saab 37 Viggen and in 1967 became the first modern canard aircraft to enter production. The success of this aircraft spurred many designers, and canard surfaces sprouted on a number of types derived from the popular Dassault Mirage delta-winged jet fighter. These included variants of the French Dassault Mirage III, Israeli IAI Kfir and South African Atlas Cheetah. The close-coupled canard delta remains a popular configuration for combat aircraft.

The Viggen also inspired the American Burt Rutan to create a two-seater homebuilt canard delta design, accordingly named VariViggen and flown in 1972. Rutan then abandoned the delta wing as unsuited to such light aircraft. His next two canard designs, the VariEze and Long-EZ had longer-span swept wings. These designs were not only successful and built in large numbers but were radically different from anything seen before. Rutan's ideas soon spread to other designers. From the 1980s they found favour in the executive market with the appearance of types such as the OMAC Laser 300, Avtek 400 and Beech Starship.

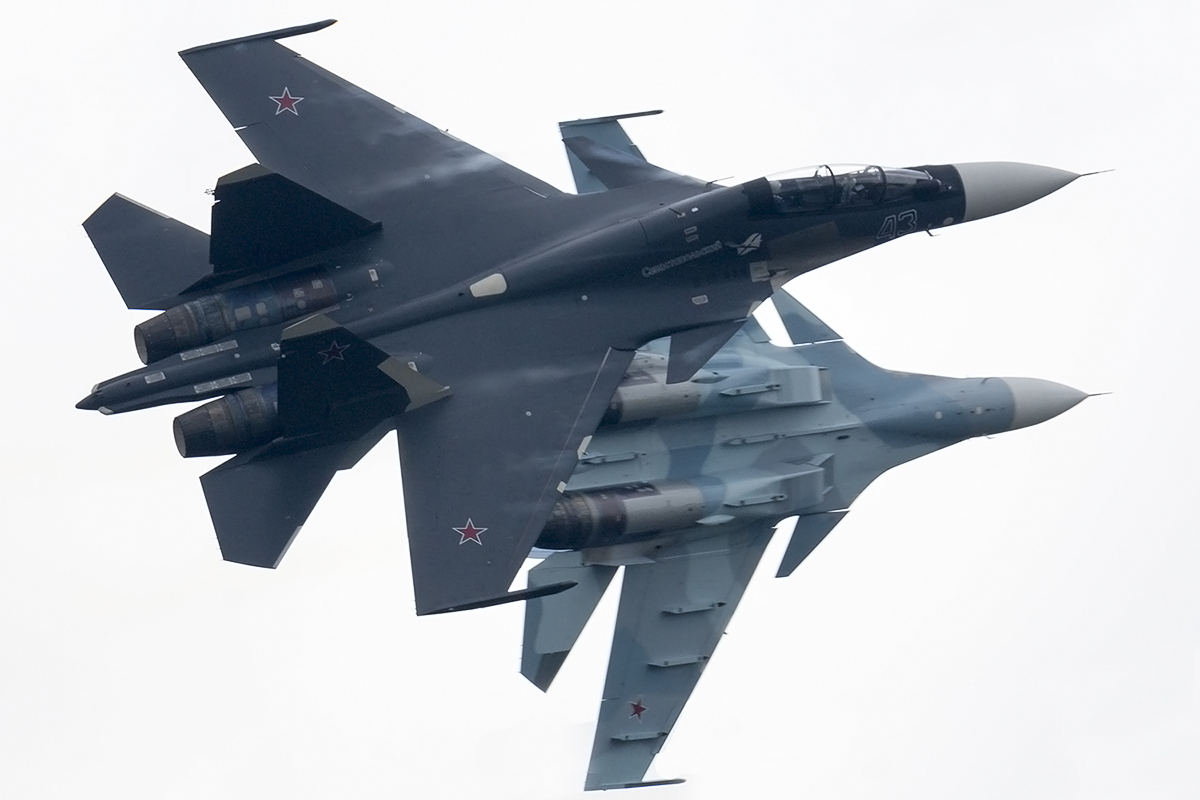
Sukhoi Su-30SM with canard.

Centers of lift and gravity and the lift forces acting on a canard-configured aircraft.

=== Computer control ===
Research shows that canard configurations demanded careful control law tuning to balance responsiveness and pilot workload. Advanced technologies such as fly-by-wire must be accompanied by proper pilot training and adaptation to accommodate the unique control characteristics of these designs. With the rapid development of technology throughout the 20th century, fighters such as the SAAB Viggen, Eurofighter Typhoon, and Dassault Rafale were made possible, achieving both high agility and stable handling.

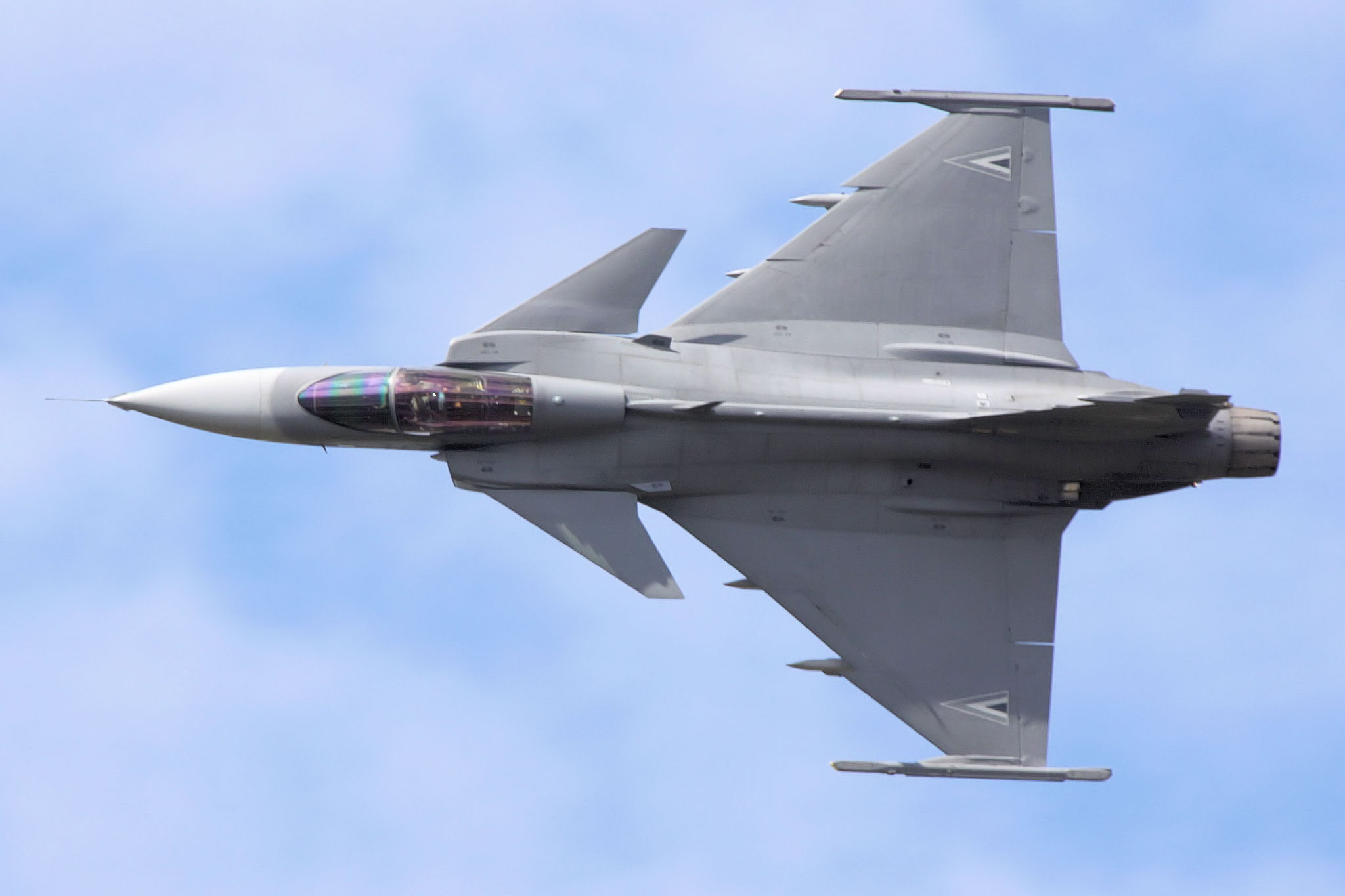
Canards visible on a JAS 39 Gripen

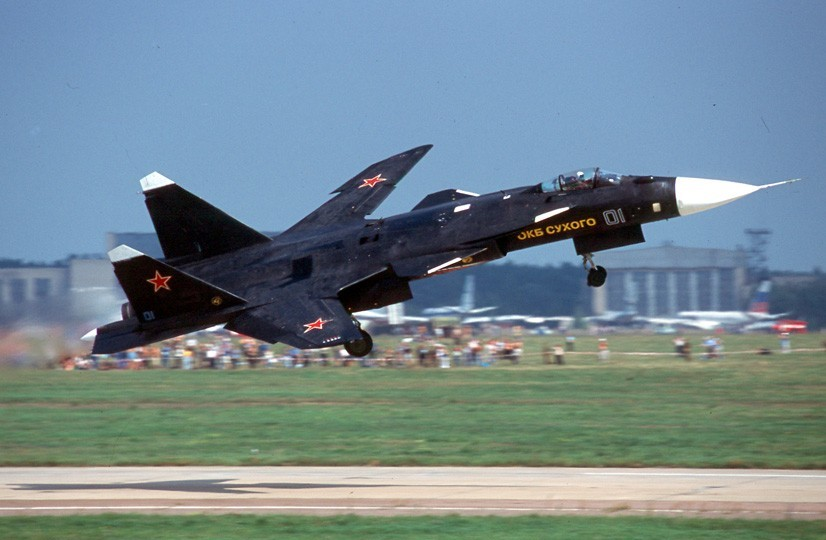
Canards on a Su-47

Static canard designs can have complex interactions in airflow between the canard and the main wing, leading to issues with stability and behaviour in the stall. This limits their applicability. The development of fly-by-wire and artificial stability in the 1980s opened the way for computerized controls to begin turning these complex effects from stability concerns into manoeuvrability advantages.

This approach produced a new generation of military canard designs. The ACX technology demonstrator for the Dassault Rafale multirole fighter first flew in July 1986, followed by the EAP technology demonstrator for the Eurofighter Typhoon in August 1986, and the Saab Gripen (first to enter service) in 1988. These three types and related design studies are sometimes referred to as the euro-canards or eurocanards. The Chinese Chengdu J-10 appeared in 1998.

== Basic principles ==
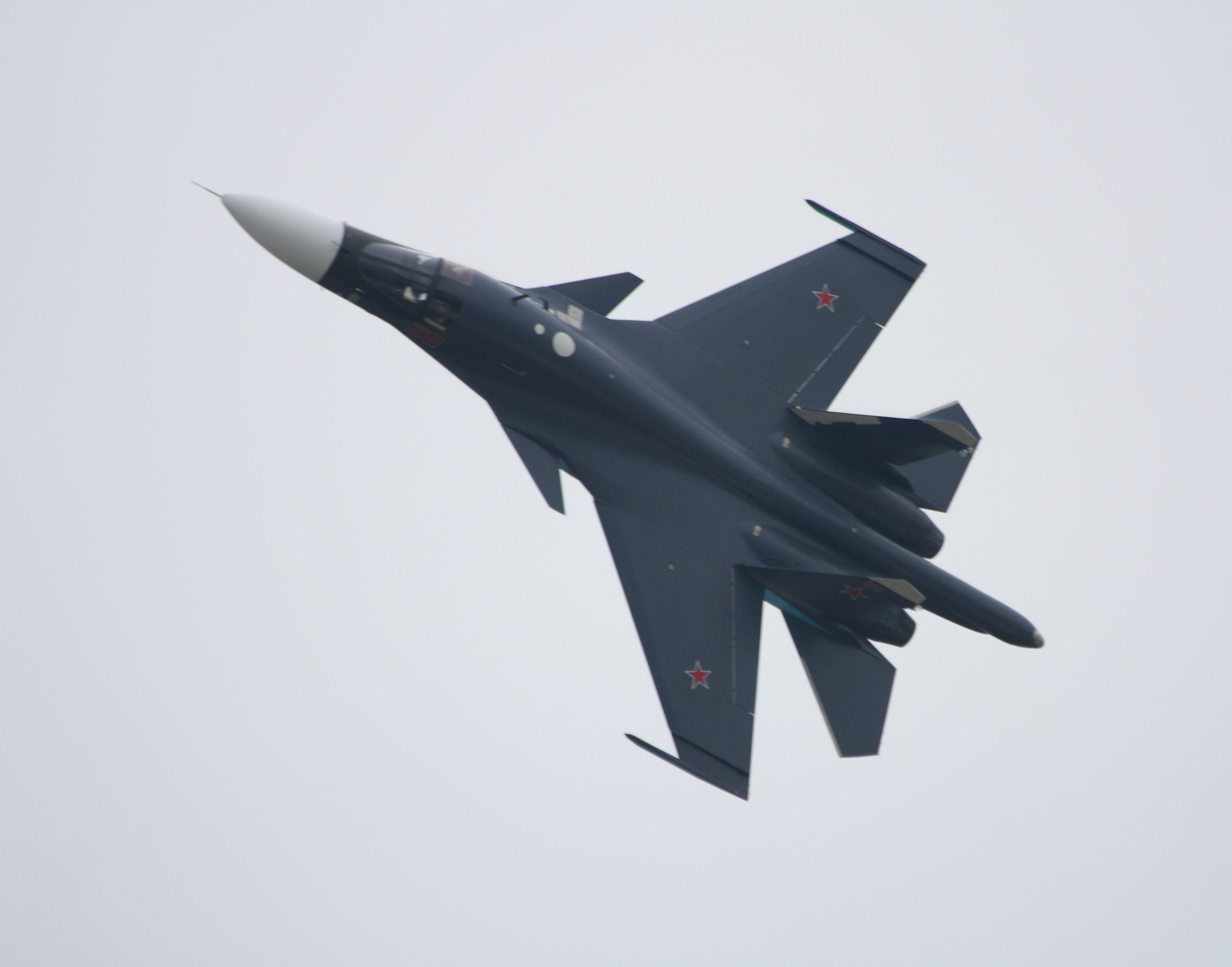
Su-34, with canards

Like any wing surface, a canard contributes to the lift, (in)stability and trim of an aircraft, and may also be used for flight control.

=== Lift ===
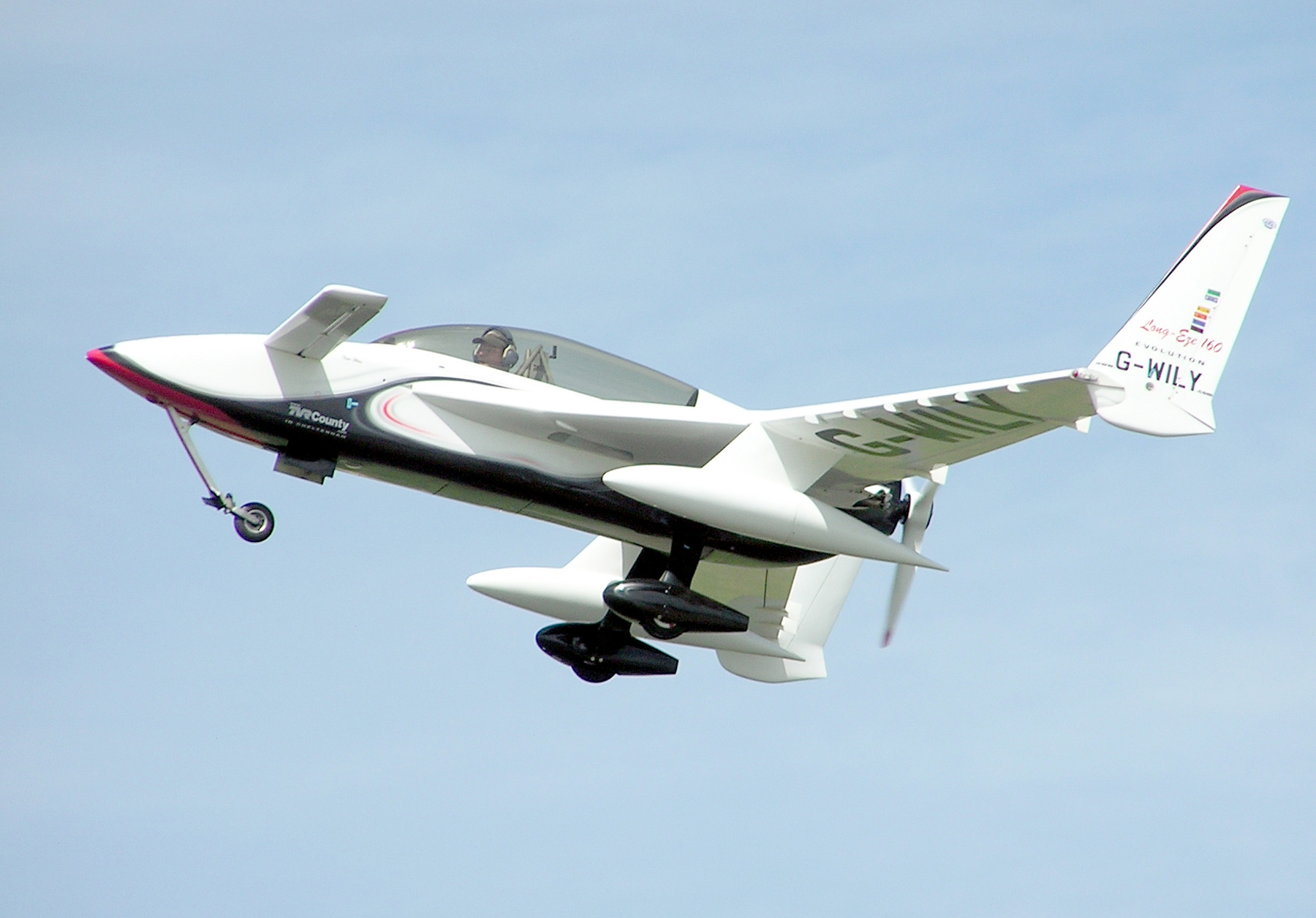
Rutan Long-EZ, with high-aspect-ratio lifting canard and suspended luggage pods

Where the canard surface contributes lift, the weight of the aircraft is shared between the wing and the canard. It has been described as an extreme conventional configuration but with a small highly loaded wing and an enormous lifting tail which enables the centre of mass to be very far aft relative to the front surface.

A lifting canard generates an upload, in contrast to a conventional aft-tail which sometimes generates negative lift that must be counteracted by extra lift on the main wing. As the canard lift adds to the overall lift capability of the aircraft, this may appear to favour the canard layout. In particular, at takeoff the wing is most heavily loaded and where a conventional tail exerts a downforce worsening the load, a canard exerts an upward force relieving the load. This allows a smaller main wing.

However, the foreplane also creates a downwash, which may affect the wing lift distribution favourably or unfavourably, so the differences in overall lift and induced drag are not obvious and they depend on the details of the design.

With a lifting canard, the main wing must be located further aft of the centre of gravity than a conventional wing, increasing the downward pitching moment caused by the deflection of its trailing-edge flaps.

=== Control ===
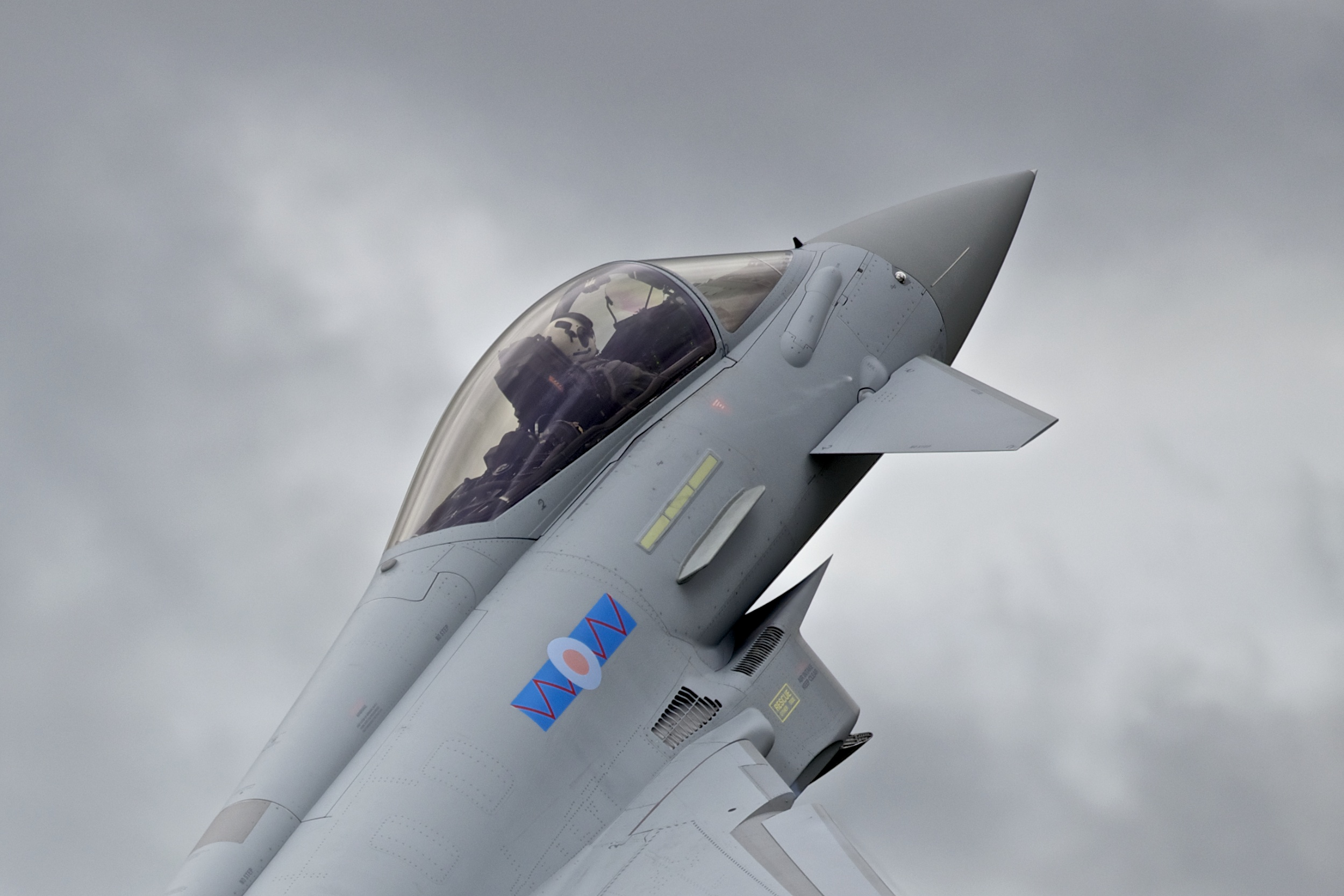
The control canard on an RAF Typhoon in flight

Pitch control in a canard type may be achieved either by the canard surface, as on the control-canard or in the same way as a tailless aircraft, by control surfaces at the rear of the main wing, as on the Saab Viggen.

In a control-canard design, most of the weight of the aircraft is carried by the wing and the canard is used primarily for pitch control during manoeuvring. A pure control-canard operates only as a control surface and is nominally at zero angle of attack and carrying no load in normal flight. Modern combat aircraft of canard configuration typically have a control-canard driven by a computerised flight control system.

Canards with little or no loading (i.e. control-canards) may be used to intentionally destabilise some combat aircraft in order to make them more manoeuvrable. The electronic flight control system uses the pitch control function of the canard foreplane to create artificial static and dynamic stability.

A benefit obtainable from a control-canard is the correction of pitch-up during a wingtip stall. An all-moving canard capable of a significant nose-down deflection can be used to counteract the pitch-up due to the tip stall. As a result, the aspect ratio and sweep of the wing can be optimised without having to guard against pitch-up. A highly loaded lifting canard does not have sufficient spare lift capacity to provide this protection.

=== Stability ===
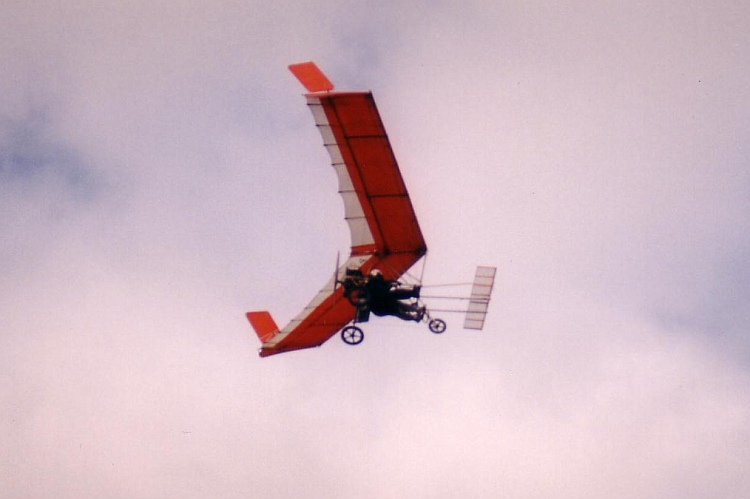
Pterodactyl Ascender II+2 with stabilising canard

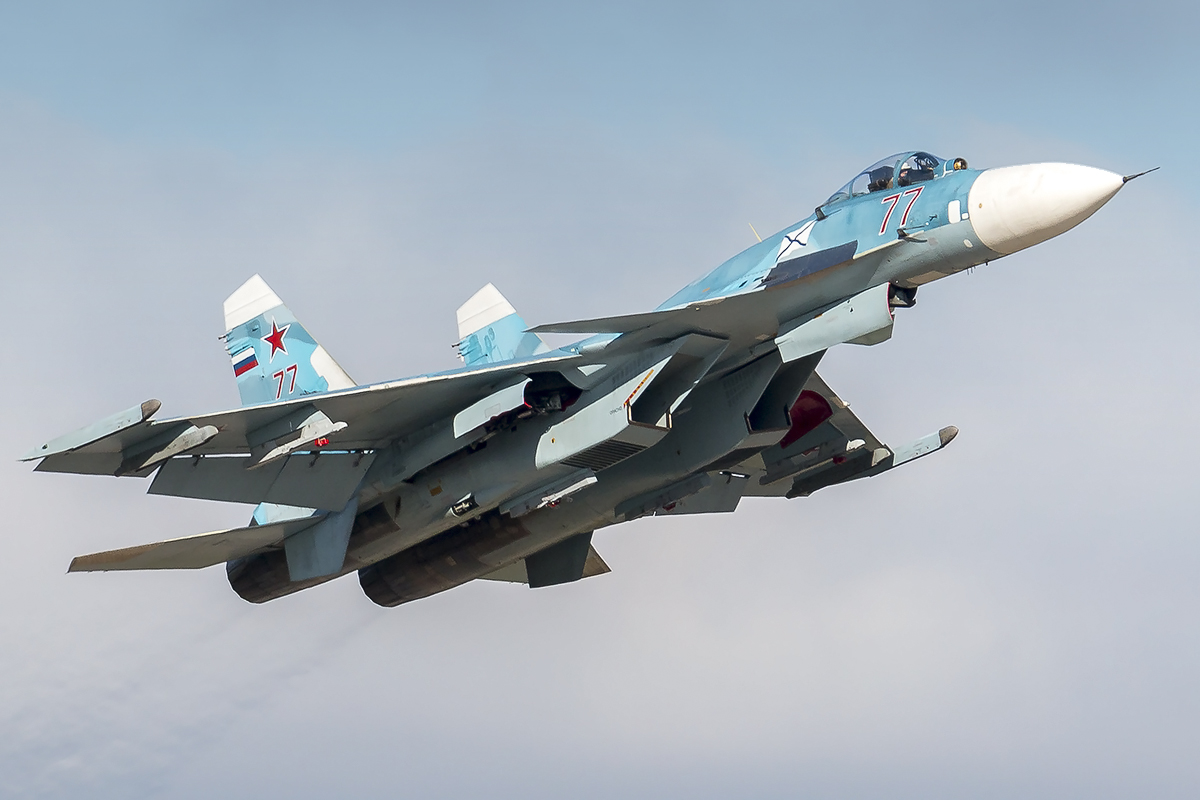
Su-33s with canard

A canard foreplane may be used as a horizontal stabiliser, whether stability is achieved statically or artificially (fly-by-wire).

Being placed ahead of the centre of gravity, a canard foreplane acts directly to reduce longitudinal static stability (stability in pitch). The first aeroplane to achieve controlled, powered flight, the Wright Flyer, was conceived as a control-canard but in effect was also an unstable lifting canard. At that time the Wright brothers believed that instability was a requirement to make an aeroplane controllable. They did not know how to make a tailplane unstable, so they chose a canard control surface for this reason.

Nevertheless, a canard stabiliser may be added to an otherwise unstable design to obtain overall static pitch stability. To achieve this stability, the change in canard lift coefficient with angle of attack (lift coefficient slope) should be less than that for the main plane. A number of factors affect this characteristic. For example, seven years after the Wrights' first flight, the ASL Valkyrie adopted the canard position in order to make the aeroplane stable and safe.

For most airfoils, lift slope decreases at high lift coefficients. Therefore, the most common way in which pitch stability can be achieved is to increase the lift coefficient (so the wing loading) of the canard. This tends to increase the lift-induced drag of the foreplane, which may be given a high aspect ratio in order to limit drag. Such a canard airfoil has a greater camber than the wing.

Another possibility is to decrease the aspect ratio of the canard, with again more lift-induced drag and possibly a higher stall angle than the wing.

A design approach used by Burt Rutan is a high aspect ratio canard with higher lift coefficient (the wing loading of the canard is between 1.6 and 2 times the wing one) and a canard airfoil whose lift coefficient slope is non-linear (nearly flat) between 14° and 24°.

Another stabilisation parameter is the power effect. In case of canard pusher propeller: "the power-induced flow clean up of the wing trailing edge" increases the wing lift coefficient slope (see above). Conversely, a propeller located ahead of the canard (increasing the lift slope of the canard) has a strong destabilising effect.

=== Trim ===
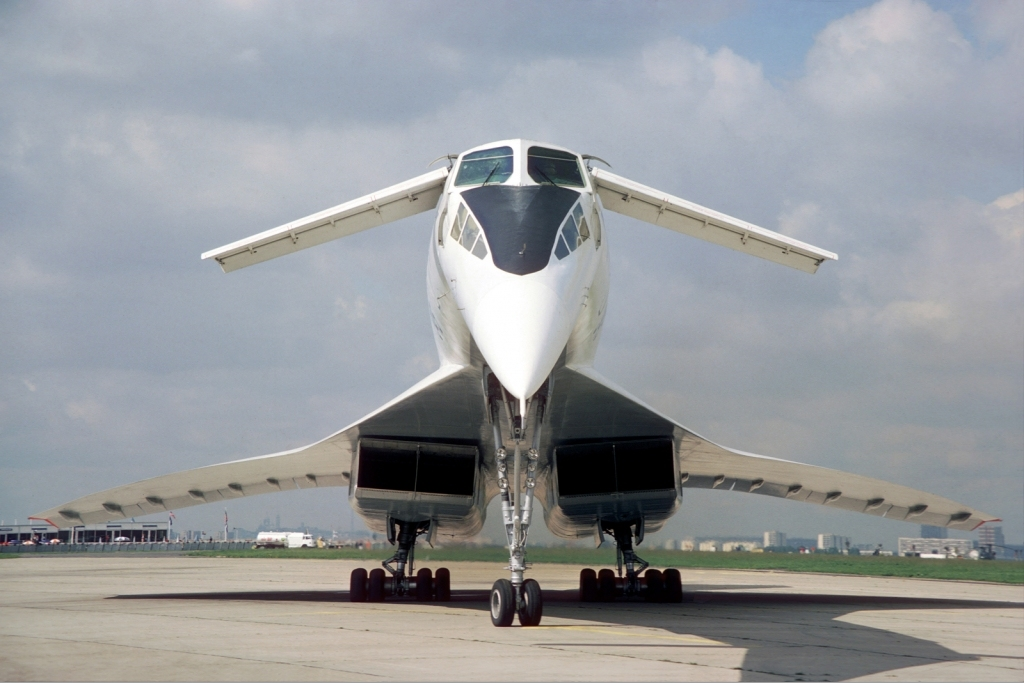
Tupolev Tu-144 with its retractable moustache canards deployed and nose drooped

A canard foreplane may be used to trim an aeroplane in pitch, just as a tail plane can. The trimming force in pitch is also a lifting force, and the greater it is, the greater the associated induced drag, known as trim drag. However, where a conventional tail typically pushed down with a negative trimming force which makes the wing work harder, a canard pushes up so the wing works less hard. This actually reduces the net drag, resulting in negative trim drag.

The use of landing flaps on the main wing causes a large trim change, which must be compensated for. The Saab Viggen has flaps on its canard surface which may be deployed simultaneously with the main flaps. The Beech Starship uses variable-sweep foreplanes to trim the position of the lift force.

When the main wing is most loaded, at takeoff, to rotate the nose up a conventional tailplane typically pushes down while a foreplane lifts up. In order to maintain trim the main wing on a canard design must therefore be located further aft relative to the centre of gravity than on the equivalent conventional design.

=== Aerodynamic Limitations and Design Trade-Offs ===
As a result of an aircraft's overall center of lift being moved forward from a lifting foreplane, canard designs have a reduced safe CG range and are more sensitive to loading and trim limits. A design goal from NASA was for the canard to stall before the main wing. Nevertheless, nonlinear lift and interference can make stall behavior complex and require careful testing. In some instances, canards do not demonstrate some of their main benefits when incorporated in optimizations that include structural weight and stability margins. Benefits depend on mission and careful layout.

== Applications ==
=== Close coupling ===
A close-coupled canard has been shown to benefit a supersonic delta wing design which gains lift in both transonic flight (such as for supercruise) and also in low speed flight (such as take offs and landings).

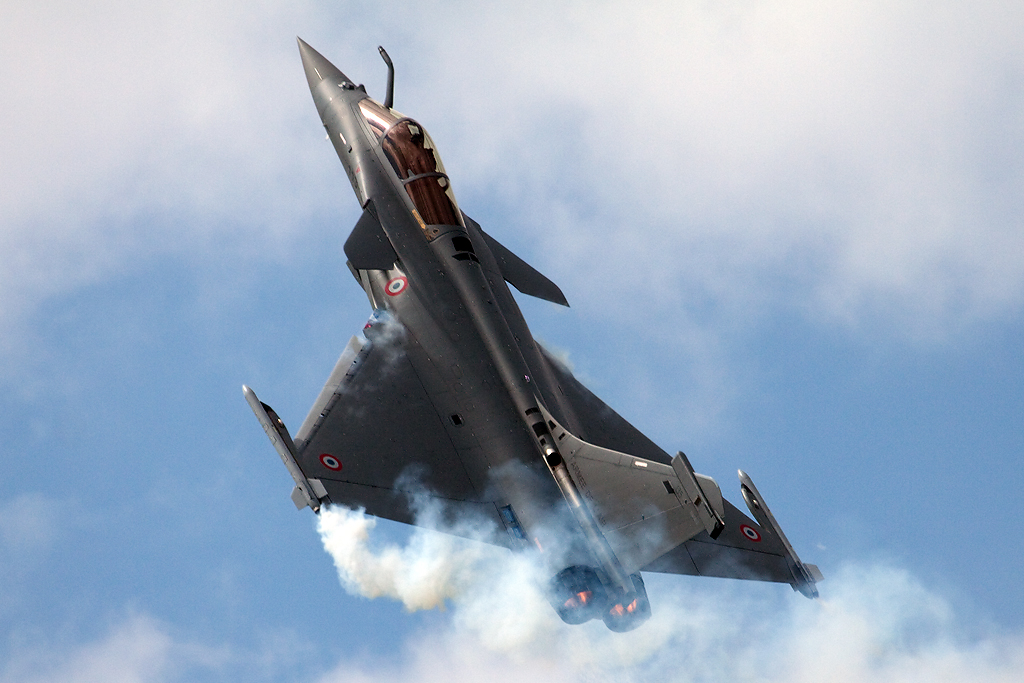
A Dassault Rafale in high angle-of-attack flight

In the close-coupled delta wing canard, the foreplane is located just above and forward of the wing. The vortices generated by a delta-shaped foreplane flow back past the main wing and interact with its own vortices. Because these are critical for lift, a badly-placed foreplane can cause severe problems. By bringing the foreplane close to the wing and just above it in a close-coupled arrangement, the interactions can be made beneficial, actually helping to solve other problems too. For example, at high angles of attack (and therefore typically at low speeds) the canard surface directs airflow downward over the wing, reducing turbulence which results in reduced drag and increased lift. Typically the foreplane creates a vortex which attaches to the upper surface of the wing, stabilising and re-energising the airflow over the wing and delaying or preventing the stall.

The canard foreplane may be fixed as on the IAI Kfir, have landing flaps as on the Saab Viggen, or be moveable and also act as a control-canard during normal flight as on the Saab Gripen.

=== Free-floating canard ===
A free-floating canard pivots so that the whole surface can rotate freely to change its angle of incidence to the fuselage without pilot input. In normal flight, the air pressure distribution maintains its angle of attack to the airflow, and therefore also the lift coefficient it generates, to a constant amount. A free-floating mechanism may increase static stability and provide safe recovery from high angle of attack evolutions. The first Curtiss XP-55 Ascender was initially fitted with a small free-floating canard lacking sufficient authority. Even on subsequent prototypes fitted with larger surfaces, "the stall was quite an experience". Secondary movable surfaces may be added to the free-floating canard, allowing pilot input to affect the generated lift, thus providing pitch control and/or trim adjustment.

=== Variable geometry ===
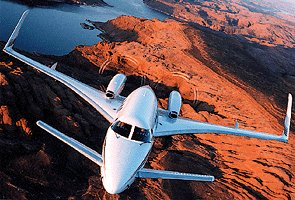
The Beechcraft Starship has variable-sweep foreplanes.

The Beechcraft Starship has a variable-sweep canard surface. The sweep is varied in flight by swinging the foreplanes forward to increase their effectiveness and so trim out the nose-down pitching effect caused by the wing flaps when deployed.

A moustache is a small, high aspect ratio foreplane which is deployed for low-speed flight in order to improve handling at high angles of attack such as during takeoff and landing. It is retracted at high speed in order to avoid the wave drag penalty of a canard design. It was first seen on the Dassault Milan and later on the Tupolev Tu-144. NASA has also investigated a one-piece slewed equivalent called the conformably stowable canard, where as the surface is stowed one side sweeps backwards and the other forwards.

=== Ride control ===
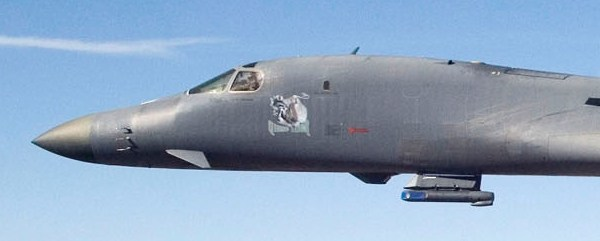
B-1B Lancer showing left hand ride-control vane at nose

The Rockwell B-1 Lancer has small canard vanes or fins on either side of the forward fuselage that form part of an active damping system that reduces aerodynamic buffeting during high-speed, low altitude flight. Such buffeting would otherwise cause crew fatigue and reduce airframe life during prolonged flights.

=== Variations ===
Canards have several different design variations. These can vary from close-coupled canards (which deliberately interact with the wing's flow to enhance lift and control), to remote canards intended to minimize coupling, to three-surface configurations which use modest foreplanes combined with conventional tails to improve trim and redundancy. There have also been ongoing efforts to investigate control authority across different flight regimes by studying variable incidence canards and morphing foreplanes, though high-speed applications present their own challenges in aeroelastic and thermal effects, particularly due to the immense friction between the aircraft's surface and air molecules.

=== Stealth ===
Canards have been loosely speculated to compromise the forwards stealth characteristics of aircraft on the argument that they present large angular surfaces that tend to reflect radar signals forwards. Counterclaims to this are that the Relaxed stability of modern fighter aircraft mean that canards only have to very momentarily deflect to induce a significant pitch rate. Additionally, in sustained high angle of attack conditions where considerable canard deflections may increase radar cross section, the aircraft is likely already detected (defending missiles or air combat manoeuvring) or not in combat (carrier landings). The Eurofighter Typhoon also uses software control of its canards to reduce its effective radar cross section, a technique likely also employed by other modern combat aircraft with canards.

Canards have nevertheless been incorporated in some later stealth aircraft studies such as an early mock-up of Lockheed Martin's Joint Advanced Strike Technology (JAST) contender and the McDonnell Douglas X-36 research prototype. The Chengdu J-20 Fifth-generation fighter uses canards in the belief that they offer the optimal balance of stealth vs. aerodynamics. Some question whether this compromises its stealth characteristics, and the question was also posed when the F-47 was first announced, though as the images are merely initial renders and not representative of the finalized production model, this argument may not be applicable.

=== Emerging Applications and Future Development ===
Unmanned platforms and specialized tactical aircraft appear to be likely niches for continued canard adoption because they can accept tighter handling envelopes and exploit the high agility benefits from canards while avoiding the constraints of some transport aircraft. Technologies will continue to be utilized to further develop canards, with a combination of CFD, aeroelastic analysis, control law development, and rigorous flight testing being primary methods to validate nonlinear behavior. As computational fluid dynamics continue to mature, they have allowed for increasingly detailed simulations of canard-wing interactions, providing engineers with precise optimization capabilities for future configurations.

== See also ==
- List of canard aircraft
- Tandem wing
- Index of aviation articles
