= AASI Jetcruzer =

American turboprop plane

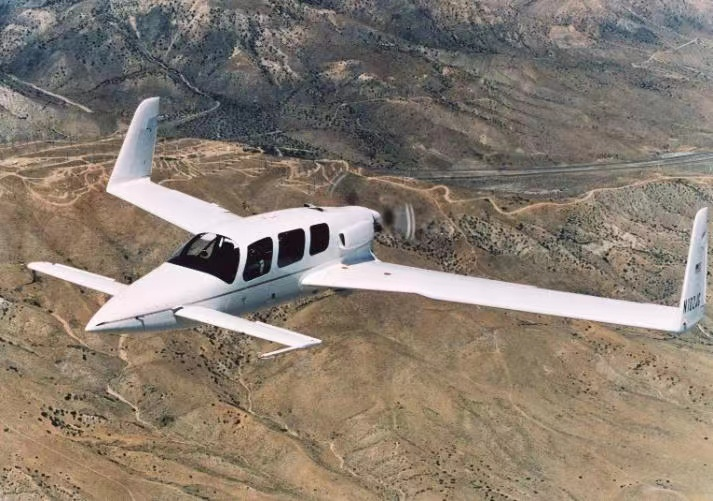
- JetCruzer 450 in flight. Photo taken in 1990.

General information
- Type: Light civil transport aircraft
- Manufacturer: Advanced Aerodynamics and Structures Inc.
- Number built: 5

History
- Introduction date: 1994
- First flight: 1989-01-11

The AASI Jetcruzer was an American single-engine turboprop light civil transport aircraft developed by Advanced Aerodynamics and Structures Inc. (AASI). The Jetcruzer had an unusual configuration, with a single turboprop engine driving a pusher propeller, a prominent canard, and fins mounted at the ends of its swept wings. The aircraft had seating for up to six people including the pilot.

The Jetcruzer 450 became the first aircraft to receive FAA certification as spin-resistant on 14 June 1994, reflecting the application of newly developed spin-resistance criteria.

== Design ==
The Jetcruzer incorporates a canard configuration with a foreplane providing pitch control and a rear-mounted turboprop engine driving a pusher propeller. The main wing is mounted aft on the fuselage and features swept geometry, while vertical stabilizers are mounted on the wingtips.

The aircraft's configuration has been compared to earlier canard designs such as the Rutan Long-EZ.

The mainplane uses a NACA 2412 airfoil with approximately 20° sweep at the quarter-chord and 4° dihedral, while the foreplane employs a modified NASA LS airfoil section.

The structure consists of aluminium alloy wings, foreplane, and vertical stabilizers, combined with a composite fuselage constructed using graphite composite and Nomex honeycomb sandwich materials.

Flight controls are manually actuated via pushrods, with ailerons on the main wing, elevators on the foreplane, and rudders on the wingtip-mounted fins.

The landing gear is a retractable tricycle arrangement with oleo-pneumatic shock absorption; the main gear retracts inward, while the nose gear retracts forward.

The Jetcruzer 500 variant is powered by a Pratt & Whitney Canada PT6A-66A turboprop engine driving a five-blade Hartzell pusher propeller.

The Jetcruzer incorporated composite materials in its primary structure. As part of the certification process, the Federal Aviation Administration imposed additional safety requirements addressing structural durability of composite materials, inspection of bonded structures, and protection of onboard systems from high-intensity radiated fields (HIRF).

== Development ==
=== Jetcruzer 450 ===
Design work on the Jetcruzer commenced in March 1983, with prototype construction starting in 1988. The aerodynamic design was undertaken in the United Kingdom by Sandy Burns from 1984 to 1985, with the layout prepared by Ladislao Pazmany and structural design carried out by David Kent of Light Transport Design in the United Kingdom. Wind tunnel testing was conducted by the University of San Diego.

Prototype construction began in June 1988 and the aircraft was first exhibited at the NBAA show in October 1988, powered by a 420 horsepower Rolls-Royce 250-C20S engine. The Allison 250-C20S-powered prototype first flew on 11 January 1989 (N5369M).

This initial version, designated the Jetcruzer 450, seated six people including the pilot. A preproduction prototype (N102JC) first flew in April 1991, followed by the first production-standard aircraft (N450JC), which first flew on 13 September 1992.

Early flight testing was conducted as part of the aircraft's certification program, during which performance and handling characteristics were evaluated.

As part of its certification process, the aircraft was subject to special conditions issued by the Federal Aviation Administration addressing its novel design features.

The aircraft received FAR Part 23 certification on 14 June 1994, becoming the first aircraft to receive FAA certification as spin-resistant under the newly developed criteria.

A single-engine FAA Part 135 public transport IFR certification was planned. Three prototypes were built; however, AASI chose not to market this aircraft and instead focused development on more advanced variants.

=== Jetcruzer 500 ===
The first version developed from the 450 was the Jetcruzer 500, a slightly stretched version powered by a Pratt & Whitney Canada PT6A-66A featuring cabin pressurization. Two of the model 450 prototypes were converted to this configuration. The prototype Jetcruzer 500 (N102JC) made its first flight on August 22, 1997 with the second prototype (N200JC) making its first flight on 7 November 1997. The first public appearance was at NBAA Las Vegas October 1998. The third prototype (N136JC) of the new build was scheduled to be flown in early 2000. This was the version selected for production, and at one point, AASI had orders for some 200 aircraft at $US 1.6 million each. A military version, the ML-2 had also been offered, as well as a UAV, the ML-1.

None of these orders would be filled, however, as the Jetcruzer 500 remained uncertified and its development slowly stagnated. Specific problems with the aircraft's noise, high stall speed, and center of gravity were not overcome before all work on it was suspended in 2002. Nearly 20 years of work had still not resulted in a marketable aircraft.

=== Jetcruzer 650 ===
In December 1992, construction work began on the prototype of an even larger variant, the Jetcruzer 650, which was to seat up to thirteen. This was quickly abandoned as the company's financial problems required resources to be focused on the 500. A military version would have been the ML-4.

=== Stratocruzer 1250 ===
Similarly, a turbofan-powered version was planned as the Stratocruzer 1250, but never left the drawing board. Design work had started in September 1991 to provide a business jet with intercontinental range. A military version, the ML-5 intended for surveillance duties, was also planned. Work was abandoned after AASI failed to attract financial backers for the project in 1995.

=== Post-AASI era ===
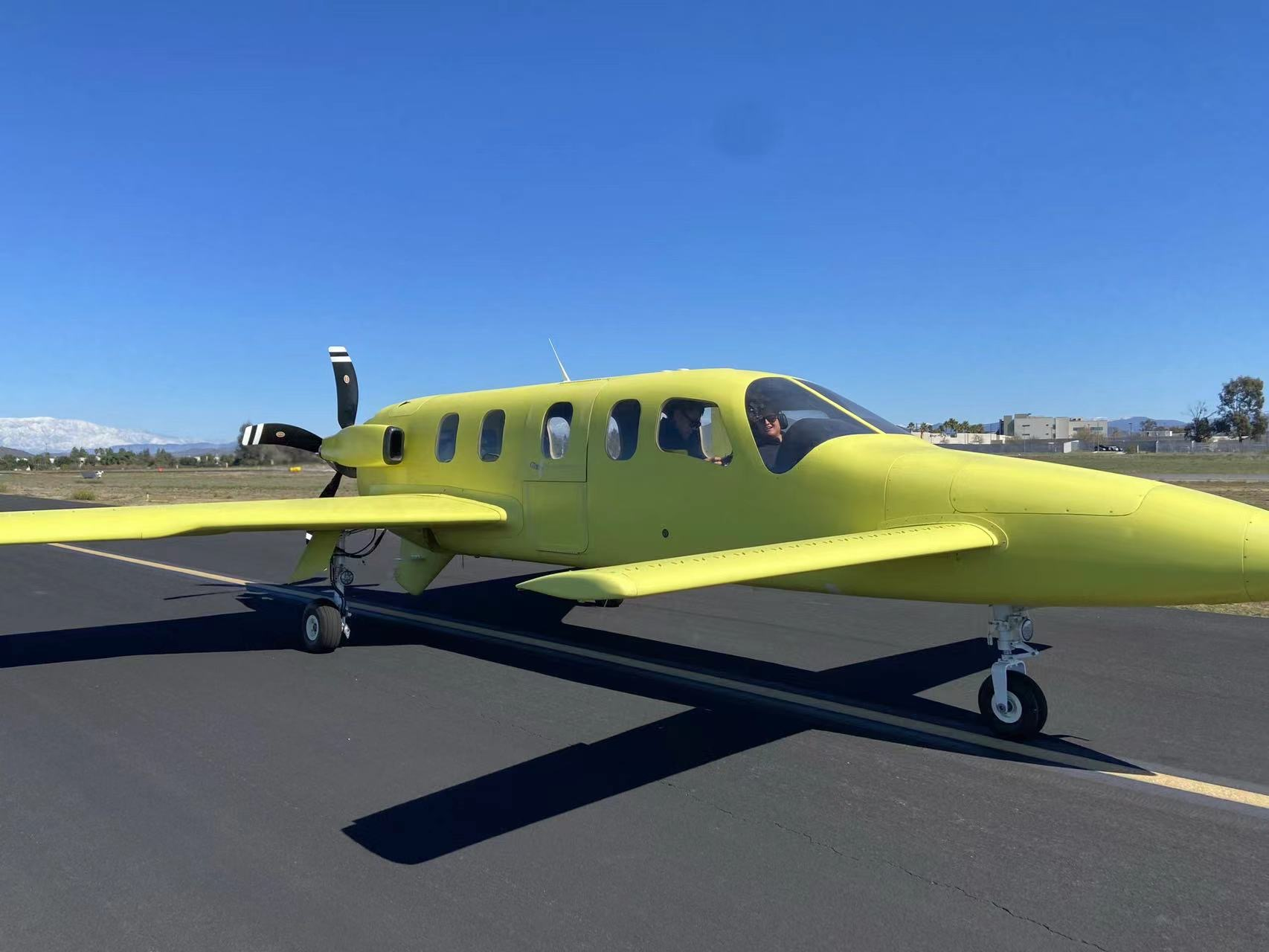
Jetcruzer 500E at Ontario airport, 2022

In November 2003, the Jetcruzer project was offered for auction by Mooney Aerospace Group, the successor to AASI, and was acquired by Innova Aircraft in February 2004.

Following the acquisition, efforts to revive the aircraft were undertaken by Jetcruzer LLC, which proposed further development of the Jetcruzer 450/500 as an experimental aircraft.

In the 2010s, the Jetcruzer program was acquired by new ownership, with plans to revive the aircraft using updated propulsion technologies.

In 2023, AIN reported that the revived program had not yet completed the first flight of its test aircraft.

In 2024, Aviation Week reported that Jetcruzer International had begun flight testing of a remanufactured Jetcruzer 500 turboprop as part of a renewed development effort.

In 2025, Jetcruzer International announced a firm order for ZeroAvia's 600 kW ZA600 electric propulsion system to support development of the Jetcruzer 500E. FlightGlobal reported that the system would be integrated into a modified Jetcruzer 500 airframe for flight testing.

== Specifications (Jetcruzer 450) ==
Data from Brassey's World Aircraft & Systems Directory 1996/97

General characteristics

- Crew: 1
- Capacity: 5 passengers
- Length: 28 ft 2 in (8.59 m)
- Wingspan: 42 ft 2 in (12.85 m) (canard span 18 ft 9 in (5.72 m)
- Height: 10 ft 5 in (3.18 m)
- Wing area: 193.2 sq ft (17.95 m^{2})
- Aspect ratio: 9.22:1
- Airfoil: NACA 2412
- Empty weight: 2,980 lb (1,352 kg)
- Max takeoff weight: 5,000 lb (2,268 kg)
- Powerplant: 1 × Pratt & Whitney Canada PT6A-27 turboprop, 680 shp (510 kW)

Performance

- Maximum speed: 320 kn (370 mph, 590 km/h)
- Cruise speed: 310 kn (360 mph, 570 km/h) (max cruise)
- Stall speed: 58 kn (67 mph, 107 km/h)
- Range: 1,478 nmi (1,701 mi, 2,737 km)
- Service ceiling: 30,000 ft (9,100 m)
- Rate of climb: 2,634 ft/min (13.38 m/s)

== Specifications (Jetcruzer 500) ==
Data from Jane's All the World's Aircraft 2001–2002

General characteristics

- Crew: 1
- Capacity: 5 passengers
- Length: 30 ft 2 in (9.19 m)
- Wingspan: 42 ft 2 in (12.85 m)
- Height: 10 ft 6 in (3.20 m)
- Wing area: 193.2 sq ft (17.95 m^{2})
- Aspect ratio: 9.2:1
- Empty weight: 3,880 lb (1,760 kg)
- Max takeoff weight: 6,200 lb (2,812 kg)
- Fuel capacity: 946 L (250 US gal)
- Powerplant: 1 × Pratt & Whitney Canada PT6A-66A turboprop, 850 shp (630 kW)
- Propellers: 5-bladed Hartzell pusher propeller, 7 ft 1 in (2.16 m) diameter

Performance

- Maximum speed: 312 kn (360 mph, 579 km/h)
- Cruise speed: 280 kn (322 mph, 518 km/h)
- Stall speed: 65 kn (75 mph, 121 km/h)
- Range: 1,280 nmi (1,474 mi, 2,372 km)
- Service ceiling: 30,000 ft (9,140 m)
- Rate of climb: 3,200 ft/min (16 m/s)
- Takeoff run: 1,900 ft (579 m)
- Takeoff to 50 ft: 2,320 ft (707 m)
- Landing from 50 ft: 1,750 ft (534 m)
- Landing run (propeller reversal): 1,231 ft (376 m)
- Endurance: 6 hours
- Wing loading: 129.9 kg/m² (26.6 lb/sq ft)
- Power loading: 4.44 kg/kW (7.29 lb/shp)

Avionics

- Honeywell Silver Crown IFR package (standard)
- EFIS optional

== See also ==
Aircraft of comparable role, configuration, and era

- Beechcraft Starship
- OMAC Laser 300
