= Beechcraft Starship =

Twin-engine turboprop aircraft

Model 2000 Starship
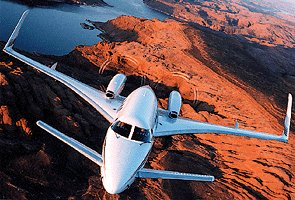

General information
- Type: Executive transport
- Manufacturer: Beechcraft
- Status: In limited use
- Number built: 53

History
- Manufactured: 1983–1995
- First flight: February 15, 1986

The Beechcraft Starship is an unorthodox twin-turboprop business aircraft designed and produced by Beech Aircraft Corporation. It is the first civil aircraft to feature an electronic flight instrument system as well as being one of the first to make extensive use of composite materials.

The Starship originated in an effort to replace the Beechcraft King Air; development work commenced in 1979 as a relatively ambitious civil programme for the era. The use of carbon fiber-reinforced polymer (CFRP) composite materials throughout the airframe was radical for the era, as were other design features, including a forward canard wing design, a pusher-propeller arrangement, and an early glass cockpit implementation. As part of the design's refinement, Scaled Composites produced an 85%-scale proof of concept (POC) aircraft that first flew in August 1983; two months later, the programme's existence was publicly revealed, after which the POC aircraft flew a demonstration flight at the 1983 National Business Aviation Association tradeshow. Three additional full-sized prototypes were flown during the latter stage of development, which was protracted due to difficulties with the composite materials and regulatory requirements necessitiating changes prior to the granting of type certification requirements in 1987, two years later than originally planned.

The first production Starship flew on April 25, 1989. However, customer demand for the aircraft proved to be weak, resulting in only 11 Starships being sold to private owners during the first three years following its launch. Beechcraft responded initially with a leasing arrangement, but ultimately opted to terminate production of the type in 1995 following the completion of only 53 aircraft. During 2003, it was announced that Beechcraft would cease operating all Starships that it owned on grounds of cost; one year later, the firm sold its remaining spare parts inventory and OEM support declined substantially over the following decade. Nevertheless, several Starships have remained flightworthy into the 2020s; most examples have been retired to be either broken up for parts or put on display in museums.

== Development ==
Work on what would become the Starship commenced in 1979, when Beech decided to explore designs for a successor to its King Air line of turboprops that would fly faster and carry more passengers. Around this time, the company's sizable marketshare in the turboprop-powered business aircraft sector had been gradually declining and there was interest in exploring advanced aircraft features to secure its market position against competitors. Accordingly, the design team studied several potential configurations for the prospective aircraft, ranging from relatively conventional to radical, with the twin goals of achieving performance akin to a jet-powered aircraft while maintaining the lower operating costs of a turboprop. During early 1980, it was decided to adopt a canard configuration for the aircraft.

Observing that the relatively large cabin and the selected configuration for the aircraft would incur significant weight, the design team opted to explore the extensive use of composite materials in its construction to achieve a better strength-to-weight ratio. However, the company's manufacturing department was divided on the adoption of composites over lack of experience with such materials. A complex supply chain involving numerous international companies became necessary to produce the aircraft. At the time of its development, it was one of the largest and most advanced business aircraft programmes to have been conducted, involving 1,000 staff centred around a purpose-built 150,000-square-foot building at its peak; accordingly, development imposed considerable costs upon the company and reportedly led to tensions with staff working on other product lines.

On August 25, 1982, Beech contracted with Scaled Composites to refine the design and build an 85%-scale proof of concept (POC) aircraft. One of the significant changes made to the design by Scaled Composites was the addition of variable geometry to the canard. In August 1983, this POC prototype made its maiden flight. This aircraft had no pressurization system, no certified avionics, and a different airframe design and material specifications from the planned production aircraft; critics noted that its dissimilarities were such that its demonstration value was questionable. Only a single POC aircraft was built; it performed more than 500 flight hours (five times more than originally planned), after which it was broken up.

In October 1983, company president and CEO Linden Blue officially announced the existence of its programme to develop a high-tech turboprop aircraft, then referred to as Starship 1. During this announcement, it was stated that Federal Aviation Administration (FAA) type certification of the aircraft under FAR Part 23 was scheduled to occur by late 1985. Months later, the POC performed its first public display at the National Business Aviation Association tradeshow in Dallas Love Field, Texas.

Prototypes were produced even as development work was continuing—a system demanded by the use of composite materials, as the tooling required was very expensive and had to be built for production use from the outset. The decision to develop the tooling in advance of the POC aircraft's completion meant that lesssons learnt could not be easily incorporated. Beechcraft produced three airworthy, full-scale prototypes, the first of which, NC-1, was used for aerodynamic testing, and was provisioned with an ejection seat. This same prototype was the only Starship to be equipped with conventional electromechanical avionics. NC-2 was used for avionics and systems testing while NC-3 was dedicated to evaluation of the flight management system and powerplant testing. NC-1 performed its maiden flight on February 15, 1986.

The programme was delayed several times, initially due to underestimations of the complexity involved in developing and manufacturing the production composite construction, and later on account of the technical difficulties of correcting a pitch-damping problem and developing the stall warning system. Furthermore, type certification requirements necessitated weight increases, which impacted the aircraft's performance. Some of the technologies used to manufacture the prototypes proved to be unsuitable for quantity production. By the end of development, the Starship had grown larger in cabin volume than the King Air 350, while having the same gross ramp weight of 15,010 lb (6,808 kg). Development of the Starship reportedly cost between $300 million and $1 billion. In 1987, type certification was received from the FAA, two years later than the programme's original timetable. The first production Starship flew on April 25, 1989.

== Design ==
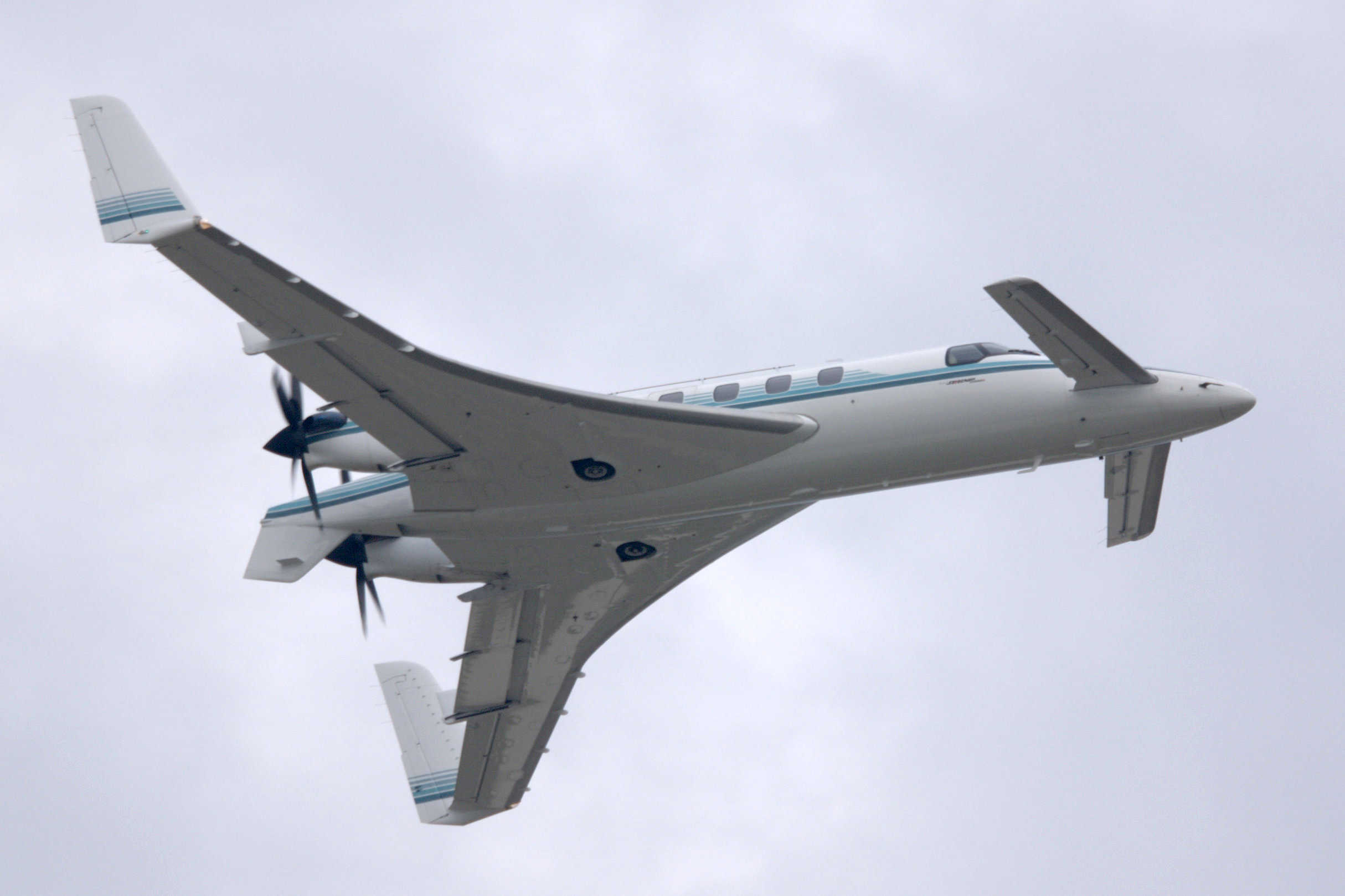
The Starship's unusual design features variable sweep canards and pusher propellers.

One noteworthy feature of the Starship was its then-unconventional carbon fiber-reinforced polymer (CFRP) composite airframe. At the time, CFRP was already being used to varying degrees on military aircraft, but at the time the Starship was developed, no civilian aircraft certified by the U.S. Federal Aviation Administration (FAA) had ever used it so extensively. Beechcraft chose this composite for its durability and high strength-to-weight ratio. According to the company, the Starship weighs less than it would have if it were built from aluminum. Nonetheless, the empty weight of production aircraft exceeded the target by several thousand pounds. These weight increases were primarily attributed for the Starship's top speed being lower than had originally been envisioned.

The Starship had an unconventional configuration, featuring both a variable-geometry canard that produces lift and a pusher engine/propeller arrangement. The aircraft employs a front-wing variable geometry/variable-sweep surface to counteract the nose-down pitch from extending the flaps and producing lift, making the aircraft "stall proof", as the forward surface stalls before the main lifting surface, which allows the nose to drop and more-normal flight to resume. The aircraft's unorthodox arrangement led to one Beechcraft president referring to it as resembling as "Klingon battlecruiser".

By mounting the engines so that the propellers are facing rearward, thus pushing rather than pulling the aircraft, reduces cabin noise as a result of the propellers being further back from the passengers and because vortices from the propeller tips do not strike the fuselage sides. However, the propellers are operating in a turbulent airflow in the pusher configuration (due to airflow past the wings moving aft in vortex sheets) and high-velocity exhaust gases are discharged directly into the propellers, producing more noise where they are than if the propellers had been in a tractor configuration. As a traditionally located vertical tail would have transmitted propeller noise into the airframe, Beechcraft opted to provide directional stability and control via rudders mounted on the winglets. Because of this arrangement, the company referred to the winglets as "tipsails".

Flight instrumentation for the Starship included a 14-tube Proline 4 AMS-850 "glass cockpit" supplied by Rockwell Collins; this was the first application of an all-glass cockpit in a business aircraft. Furthermore, various aspects of the Starship's functions, from the environmental controls to cabin pressurization and the automated deicing system, functioned using computers. By 2014, the AMS-850 avionics suite was out of production and OEM support for its accompanying database had been dropped. In 2020, aftermarket provider Aerospace Quality Research and Development announced a package to make remaining Starships compliant with ADS-B requirements.

== Operational history ==
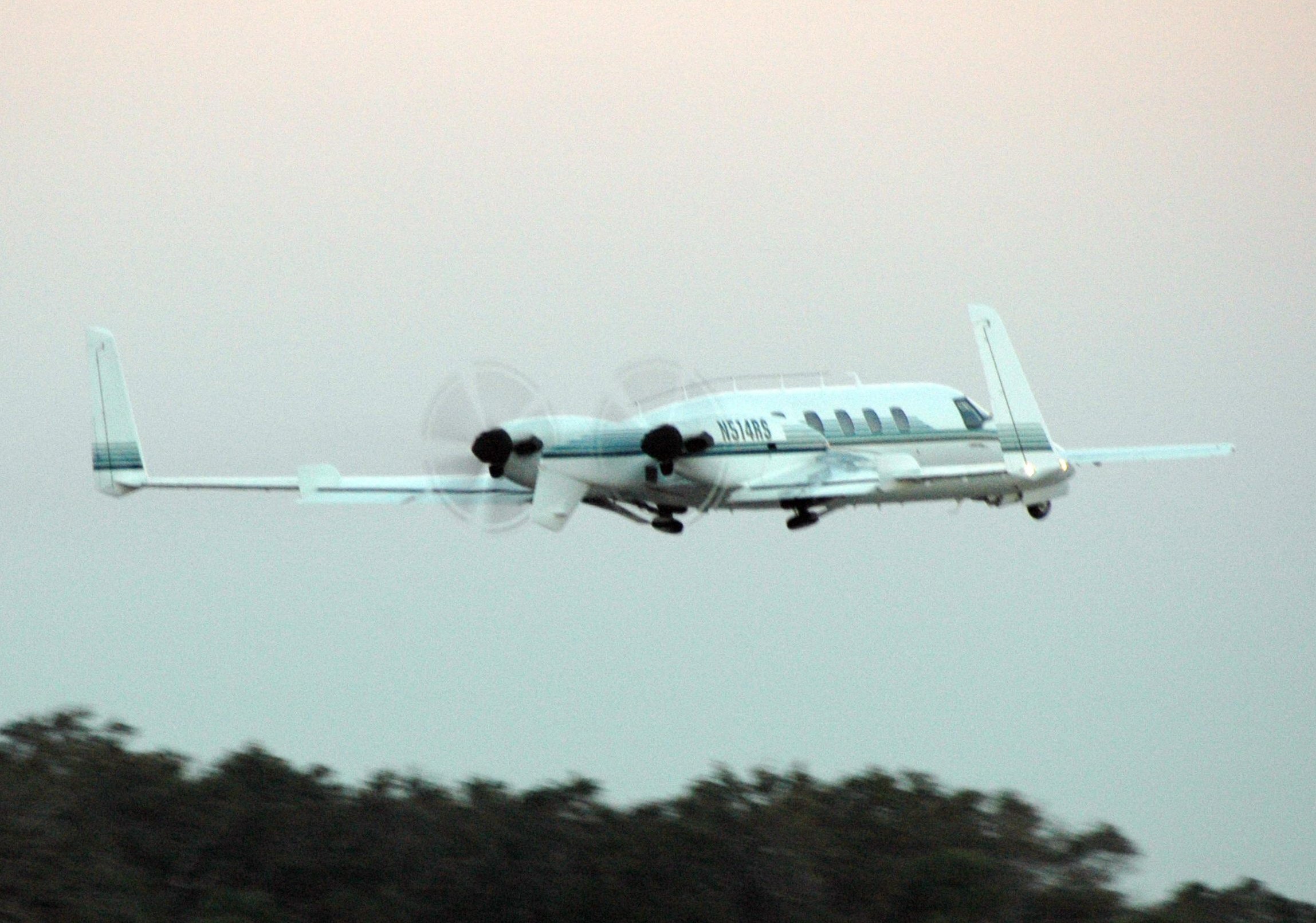
A Beechcraft Starship

Beech sold only 11 Starships to private owners during the first three years following type certification. This poor sales performance was attributed to multiple factors, including an economic slowdown in the late 1980s, the unconventional design of the Starship, and a tax on luxury goods that was in effect in the United States at the time. Furthermore, early aircraft proved to be fairly unreliable, which damaged consumer enthusiasm for the type, although many of the early teething issues were quickly remedied. It has also been speculated that the price and performance of the aircraft was largely responsible; its list price in 1989 was $3.9 million, similar to the Cessna Citation V and Learjet 31 business jets, which possessed maximum cruise speeds 89 and 124 knots faster than the Starship respectively; furthermore, the competing Piper Cheyenne turboprop was both faster and cheaper to buy. The King Air that the Starship was intended to replace was also fairly competitive, carrying two additional passengers while travelling almost as fast.

To stimulate demand, Beechcraft began offering two-year leases on new Starships in 1991. One of the Starships appeared in the opening scenes of the Murder, She Wrote TV series episode "Terminal Connection" in 1991.

In 1992, company president Jack Braley stated that unless customer demand increased, production would be terminated after the completion of the 53rd aircraft. Three years later, NC-53 would be the final Starship to be produced.

In 2003, Beechcraft said that supporting such a small fleet of airplanes was cost-prohibitive and chose to decommission the aircraft under its control. Numerous aircraft were sent to the Evergreen Air Center, located at the Pinal Airpark in Arizona, and were allegedly intended to be destroyed. To prevent scrapped aircraft from being returned to flight, workers drilled holes into the spars to weaken them; however, this measure is believed to be repairable and thus reversible. Beechcraft reportedly worked with owners of privately owned Starships to replace their aircraft with other company aircraft, such as the Premier I jet.

In 2004, Raytheon, Beech's parent company, sold off its entire inventory of Starship components for a fraction of its retail value. The purchaser, Robert Scherer, thus became a key supplier for the type, and further expanded his parts inventory by acquiring several retired airframes and parts removed from other withdrawn aircraft. In 2014, Robert Scherer, stated that he foresees the ability to sustain the remaining flightworthy Starships for at least 50 years.

== Variants ==
Model 115
A conceptual 85%-scale prototype built by Scaled Composites, it was scrapped by Beech at Mojave Airport in 1990.

Model 2000
This initial production version - 20 were produced, including three preproduction, airworthy prototypes.

Model 2000A
The final 2000A configuration had tuning fork-type noise dampers and improved insulation to reduce cabin noise and redesigned exhaust stacks for more efficient engine airflow. Stall strips placed on the front wing to enhance stall behavior were removed. Elimination of the stall strips reduced stall speed by up to 9 knots (10 mph; 17 km/h), which allows the 2000A to take off from shorter runways. The 2000 had standpipes in the fuel tanks to artificially limit fuel capacity so the aircraft would meet a target payload weight. The standpipes were removed in the 2000A, increasing fuel capacity by 31 US gal (117 L). Both the maximum ramp weight and takeoff weight were increased by 500 lb (227 kg) and zero fuel weight was increased 400 lb (181 kg).

Beechcraft did not serialize the 2000A as a distinct model, and thus it was not issued a new FAA type certificate. The company produced a kit to upgrade serial numbers NC-4 through NC-20 to 2000A specifications.

== Aircraft on display ==
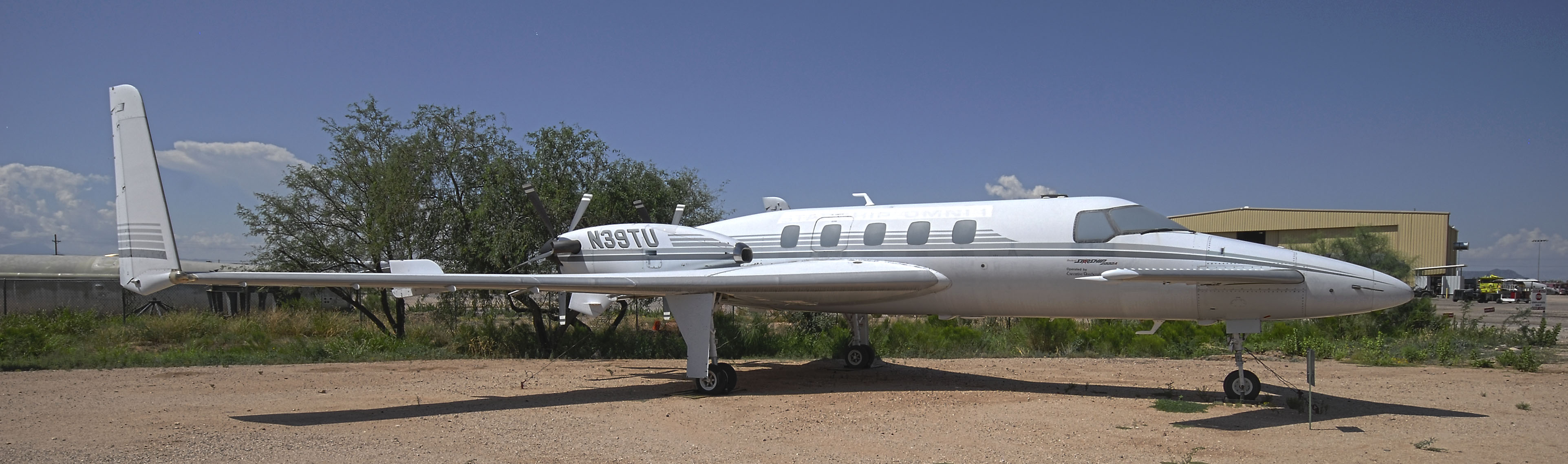
Beechcraft Starship NC-23 at the Pima Air and Space Museum, Tucson, Arizona

Several Starships have been donated to museums since the decommissioning program began. The Kansas Aviation Museum received the first donated aircraft, NC-41, in August 2003 and the Beechcraft Heritage Museum in Tullahoma, Tennessee, received the second donated aircraft, NC-49, in September 2003. NC-42 was donated to the Museum of Flight in Seattle, Washington, and is currently on loan to the Future of Flight at Paine Field in Everett, Washington. NC-27 was donated to Evergreen Aviation & Space Museum in McMinnville, Oregon, in late 2003 and is currently on static display. NC-23 is on Airline Row at the Pima Air & Space Museum. NC-6 is on display in Liberal, Kansas, at the Mid-America Air Museum. Aircraft NC-28 is on display at the Queensland Air Museum, after it was used by the Queensland Institute for Aviation Engineering in Caloundra. Aircraft NC-14 is on display outside at the Southern Museum of Flight.

== Surviving aircraft ==
In 2003, Evergreen Air Center sold eight Starships back to private owners for $50,000 each. Most are being used for parts; however, one of these aircraft has since been made airworthy again. Some former Starship components have been used on the Epic turboprop kitplane.

By January 2010, nine Starships held an active registration with the FAA. Three Starships were registered in Oklahoma (NC-29, NC-35, and NC-45), one in Texas (NC-50), one in Colorado (NC-51), and four were registered to Beechcraft in Wichita, Kansas (NC-2, NC-8, NC-19, and NC-24). NC-51 was used as a chase plane during the re-entry phase of Burt Rutan's SpaceShipOne. In October 2008, NC-29 was the first of the five remaining privately owned airworthy Starships to complete reduced vertical separation minima certification, returning the aircraft's service ceiling to the original flight level 410 limit.

Salt Lake Community College used a Starship in their aviation maintenance program until late 2012, at which point it was sold and scrapped for parts.

By September 2020, only six Starships were airworthy. Two Beechcraft Starships (NC-33 and NC-50) were located in Addison, Texas. NC-33 lost its data plate when it was scrapped, and was subsequently registered in Mexico, but when brought back to the US, the FAA revoked its certificate. It is now registered in the experimental category as N903SC. The other airworthy Starships were located in Oklahoma (NC-35 and NC-45), Colorado (NC-51), and Germany (NC-29, though registered with the FAA by a company in Delaware).

== Specifications (2000A) ==
Data from Flying Magazine, NC-53 POH, except where noted

General characteristics

- Crew: 1 or 2
- Capacity: 6
- Length: 46 ft 1 in (14.05 m)
- Wingspan: 54 ft 5.70 in (16.6 m)
- Height: 12 ft 1.3 in (3.94 m)
- Wing area: 281 sq ft (26.1 m^{2})
- Empty weight: 10,085 lb (4,574 kg) standard empty weight
- Gross weight: 15,010 lb (6,808 kg) maximum ramp weight
- Max takeoff weight: 14,900 lb (6,759 kg)
- Fuel capacity: 565 gallons, or 3785 lbs.
- Powerplant: 2 × Pratt & Whitney Canada PT6A-67A turboprop, 1,200 shp (890 kW) each
- Propellers: 5-bladed McCauley, 8 ft 8 in (2.64 m) diameter

Performance

- Maximum speed: 385 mph (620 km/h, 335 kn)
- Cruise speed: 353 mph (568 km/h, 307 kn)
- Stall speed: 112 mph (180 km/h, 97 kn) maximum weight with flaps retracted & idle power
- Minimum control speed: 108 mph (174 km/h, 94 kn) flaps retracted
- Range: 1,742 mi (2,804 km, 1,514 nmi)
- Service ceiling: 41,000 ft (12,500 m)
- Rate of climb: 2,748 ft/min (13.96 m/s)
- Wing loading: 53 lb/sq ft (260 kg/m^{2})
- Power/mass: 6.2 lb/shp

== See also ==
Aircraft of comparable role, configuration, and era

- AAC Angel
- AASI Jetcruzer
- Adam A500
- Avtek 400A
- Embraer/FMA CBA 123 Vector
- LearAvia Lear Fan
- OMAC Laser 300
- Piaggio P.180 Avanti
