= OMAC Laser 300 =

American 1981 prototype aircraft

Laser 300
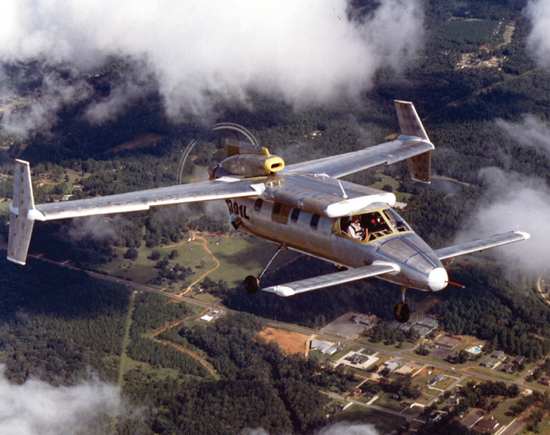

General information
- Type: Business aircraft
- National origin: United States
- Manufacturer: OMAC
- Status: Abandoned
- Number built: 3

History
- First flight: 11 December 1981

The OMAC Laser 300, originally named the OMAC I is a canard pusher business aircraft built in the United States in 1981 but which never saw production.

== Design ==
It is a canard layout powered by a pusher turboprop engine, and a high, swept wing carrying endplate fins on the tips. Construction was of metal throughout. The cabin could seat six to seven passengers, and incorporated quick-change seating, allowing rapid conversion for freight. Early in development, plans existed to produce a turbofan-powered version of the design, but this did not happen.

== Development ==
The first prototype flew on 11 December 1981 and OMAC ("Old Man's Aircraft Company") hoped to obtain type certification by mid 1982. This was delayed by a ground accident, and then a landing accident caused by the failure of an undercarriage locking pin. A second prototype flew on 19 February 1983, and certification was expected "no later than December 1984", but in late 1983, the process had barely started.

In the mid-1980s, it was tested at the Langley 12-Foot Low-Speed Tunnel to investigate its stability and control characteristics. Special attention was paid to behaviour at high angles of attack and to stall and spin resistance, and it was found to have poor longitudinal stability at high angles of attack. The wing was modified, with extensions added to the trailing edge flaps, and a discontinuous, leading edge droop added to the outboard section of the wings. Stall characteristics were good since the canard provided a nose-down pitching moment. Changes were tested on the second prototype before the design was frozen in April 1985. Additionally, production machines were to have a different fuselage with a round cross-section, a redesigned nose, and additional baggage space.

OMAC relocated from Reno, Nevada to Albany, Georgia in January 1985, as Ayres Corporation was to manufacture them at their Albany plant. Certification was then anticipated by mid-1986. and by late 1986, a third prototype was under construction, incorporating refinements that had been tested on the second machine. This machine was built alongside three other Laser 300s, together representing the first four of thirty aircraft that Omac hoped to build by the end of 1987. The third prototype, and first production machine flew on 29 July 1987 and certification was now expected by May 1988. By now, production was running a year late, and projected costs had risen from $US 550,000 to $875,000. The aircraft was displayed at the NBAA show in Dallas, Texas in October 1988, by which time 56 hours of flight testing had been carried out without incident. Certification was delayed again, and expected by late 1989 or early 1990, however, $20 million was required for certification and production, but insufficient funds were raised and development stalled. Omac continued to offer the aircraft as late as 1993, along with an improved version designated the Laser 360.

== Specifications (Laser 300 prototype) ==
Data from Jane's All the World's Aircraft 1987–88 p.480

General characteristics

- Crew: two pilots
- Capacity: five passengers
- Length: 29 ft 7 in (9.02 m)
- Wingspan: 41 ft 6 in (12.65 m)
- Height: 9 ft 10 in (3.00 m)
- Wing area: 230 sq ft (21 m^{2})
- Empty weight: 3,800 lb (1,724 kg)
- Gross weight: 6,400 lb (2,903 kg)
- Powerplant: 1 × Pratt & Whitney Canada PT6A-135A , 750 hp (560 kW)

Performance

- Cruise speed: 290 mph (470 km/h, 250 kn)
- Range: 2,165 mi (3,484 km, 1,881 nmi)
- Service ceiling: 30,000 ft (9,100 m)
- Rate of climb: 2,000 ft/min (10 m/s)

== See also ==
Aircraft of comparable role, configuration, and era

- AASI Jetcruzer
- Beechcraft Starship
- Piaggio P.180 Avanti
