= Wickham Model E =

Wickham Model E Sunbird II

General information
- Type: Homebuilt aircraft
- National origin: United States
- Designer: Jim Wickham
- Status: Crashed July 20, 1980
- Number built: 1

History
- First flight: August 8, 1979

The Wickham Model E Sunbird II is a single seat homebuilt aircraft designed by engineer James M. Wickham. Jim Wickham had studied engineering at Ohio State University, and graduated from MIT as an Aeronautical Engineer. Wickham's career began at Chance-Vought, then in 1938 joined the Stearman division of Boeing. Starting in the 1950s, Wickham started designing and building his own series of homebuilt aircraft.

== Design ==
The Sunbird II is a single place low wing aircraft made primarily of wood. It differs from the Model C by employing tricycle landing gear, a larger wing, and power from a larger 1835cc VW engine.

== Operational history ==
The Wickham E was the fifth of six designs by Wickham, which first flew on August 8, 1979 at Arlington, WA. The aircraft was lost following a spin test where the aircraft did not recover.

== Specifications (Wickham Model E Sunbird II) ==
Data from Sport Aviation, original drawings,

General characteristics

- Capacity: 1
- Length: 18 ft (5.5 m)
- Wingspan: 26 ft 8 in (8.13 m)
- Height: 7 ft (2.1 m)
- Wing area: 82 sq ft (7.6 m^{2})
- Aspect ratio: 8.7
- Propellers: 2-bladed 54/40

Performance

- Maximum speed: 100 kn (120 mph, 190 km/h)

== See also ==
Related development

- Wickham A Bluebird
- Wickham B
- Wickham Model C
