= Richard 150 Commuter =

150 Commuter

General information
- Type: Two-seat cabin monoplane
- National origin: United States
- Manufacturer: The C.H. Richard Company

History
- First flight: 1972
- Developed from: Richard 125 Commuter

The Richard 150 Commuter is an American two-seat cabin monoplane designed and built by The C.H. Richard Company of Lancaster, California to be sold in kit form or as plans for amateur construction.

== Design and development ==
A development of the early Richard 125 Commuter flown in 1969, the 150 Commuter is a braced high-wing monoplane with all-metal construction of the wings, monocoque fuselage and tail unit. It has a non-retractable conventional landing gear with a tailwheel. The prototype was powered by a 150 hp (112 kW) Lycoming O-320-A2A air-cooled engine with a two-bladed metal tractor propeller. The enclosed cabin has two side-by-side seats with dual controls and a baggage space behind the seats. After the prototype first flew in 1972, a new wing was designed with different wing section and an area of 100 ft^{2} (9.29 m^{2}).

== Specifications (prototype with original wing) ==
Data from Jane's All the World's Aircraft 1973-74

General characteristics

- Crew: 2
- Length: 19 ft 9 in (6.02 m)
- Wingspan: 30 ft 0 in (9.14 m)
- Height: 5 ft 6 in (1.68 m)
- Wing area: 120 sq ft (11.1 m^{2})
- Empty weight: 1,010 lb (450 kg)
- Gross weight: 1,500 lb (680 kg)
- Powerplant: 1 × Lycoming O-320-A2A four-cylinder, horizontally-opposed air-cooled piston engine , 150 hp (110 kW)

Performance

- Maximum speed: 120 mph (193 km/h, 100 kn)
- Cruise speed: 110 mph (177 km/h, 96 kn)
- Stall speed: 54 mph (87 km/h, 47 kn)
- Rate of climb: 1,100 ft/min (5.6 m/s)
