= V24 =

V24 may refer to:

== Aircraft ==
- Fokker V.24, a German fighter aircraft prototype
- Mil V-24, a Soviet helicopter prototype
- Softex-Aero V-24, a Ukrainian light aircraft

== Other uses ==
- ITU-T V.24, a telecommunications standard
- V24 engine
