= Custom Flight Lite Star =

Canadian homebuilt light aircraft

Lite Star

General information
- Type: Amateur-built aircraft
- National origin: Canada
- Manufacturer: Custom Flight
- Status: In production (2016)
- Number built: 2 (2011)

History
- Developed from: Custom Flight North Star

The Custom Flight Lite Star, or Light Star, is a Canadian amateur-built and light-sport aircraft, designed and produced by Custom Flight of Tiny, Ontario. The aircraft is supplied as a kit for amateur construction or complete ready-to-fly.

== Design and development ==
The Lite Star features a strut-braced high-wing, a single-seat, a two-seats-in-side-by-side configuration enclosed cockpit that is 39.8 in (101 cm) wide, fixed conventional landing gear and a single engine in tractor configuration.

The aircraft fuselage is made from welded 4130 steel tubing, with the wing constructed from aluminum sheet, with its flying surfaces covered in doped aircraft fabric. Its 30.5 ft (9.3 m) span wing has an area of 160 sq ft (15 m^{2}) and has no flaps. The wing is supported by "V"-struts and jury struts. The aircraft's recommended engine power range is 65 to 110 hp (48 to 82 kW) and standard engines used include the 110 hp (82 kW) Chevrolet Corvair automotive conversion four-stroke powerplant. Construction time from the supplied kit is 400 hours.

== Operational history ==
By December 2016 two examples had been registered with Transport Canada as Light Stars.

As of December 2016, the design does not appear on the Federal Aviation Administration's list of approved special light-sport aircraft.

== Specifications (Lite Star) ==
Data from Kitplanes

General characteristics

- Crew: one
- Capacity: one passenger
- Length: 21 ft (6.4 m)
- Wingspan: 30 ft 6 in (9.30 m)
- Wing area: 160 sq ft (15 m^{2})
- Empty weight: 650 lb (295 kg)
- Gross weight: 1,320 lb (599 kg)
- Fuel capacity: 20 U.S. gallons (76 L; 17 imp gal)
- Powerplant: 1 × Chevrolet Turbo-Air 6 engine four cylinder, air-cooled, four stroke automotive conversion, 110 hp (82 kW)
- Propellers: 2-bladed ground adjustable composite propeller

Performance

- Cruise speed: 100 mph (160 km/h, 87 kn)
- Stall speed: 45 mph (72 km/h, 39 kn)
- Range: 400 mi (640 km, 350 nmi)
- Rate of climb: 1,000 ft/min (5.1 m/s)
- Wing loading: 8.25 lb/sq ft (40.3 kg/m^{2})
