= Explorer Ellipse =

American homebuilt aircraft

Ellipse

General information
- Type: Homebuilt aircraft
- National origin: United States
- Manufacturer: Explorer Aviation
- Designer: Dean Wilson
- Status: Production completed
- Number built: At least four

The Explorer Ellipse is an American homebuilt aircraft that was designed by Dean Wilson and produced by Explorer Aviation of Grangeville, Idaho. When it was available the aircraft was supplied as a kit for amateur construction.

== Design and development ==
The Ellipse features a strut-braced high-wing that has an elliptical planform, a four-seat enclosed cabin with doors, fixed conventional landing gear and a single engine in tractor configuration.

The aircraft fuselage is made from welded 4130 steel tubing with a wooden wing. The aircraft is covered in doped aircraft fabric. Its 36.62 ft (11.2 m) span wing, mounts flaps and has a wing area of 128.0 sq ft (11.89 m^{2}). The wings can be folded in five minutes by one person to facilitate ground transportation or storage. The cabin width is 43 in (110 cm). The acceptable power range is 125 to 200 hp (93 to 149 kW) and the standard engine used is the 150 hp (112 kW) Lycoming O-320 powerplant. With this powerplant the aircraft has a cruise speed of 150 mph (240 km/h).

The Ellipse has a typical empty weight of 1,177 lb (534 kg) and a gross weight of 2,200 lb (1,000 kg), giving a useful load of 1,023 lb (464 kg). With full fuel of 41 U.S. gallons (160 L; 34 imp gal) the payload for crew/pilot, passengers and baggage is 777 lb (352 kg).

The kit originally came with the complex wings already built and as a result the designer estimated the construction time from the supplied kit as 1000 hours. Float and ski fittings were included in the kit as standard equipment.

== Operational history ==
By 1998 the company reported that three kits had been sold and one aircraft was flying.

In December 2013 two examples were registered in the United States with the Federal Aviation Administration, although at one time four had been registered.

== Specifications (Ellipse) ==
Data from AeroCrafter

General characteristics

- Crew: one
- Capacity: three passengers
- Length: 20 ft 0 in (6.10 m)
- Wingspan: 36 ft 7.4 in (11.161 m)
- Wing area: 128.0 sq ft (11.89 m^{2})
- Empty weight: 1,177 lb (534 kg)
- Gross weight: 2,200 lb (998 kg)
- Fuel capacity: 41 U.S. gallons (160 L; 34 imp gal)
- Powerplant: 1 × Lycoming O-320 four cylinder, air-cooled, four stroke aircraft engine, 150 hp (110 kW)
- Propellers: 2-bladed fixed pitch, metal

Performance

- Cruise speed: 150 mph (240 km/h, 130 kn)
- Stall speed: 55 mph (89 km/h, 48 kn) flaps up
- Range: 650 mi (1,050 km, 560 nmi)
- Service ceiling: 15,200 ft (4,600 m)
- Rate of climb: 950 ft/min (4.8 m/s)
- Wing loading: 17.2 lb/sq ft (84 kg/m^{2})
