= Warne Bubble Plane =

1990s American sporting aircraft

Bubble Plane

General information
- Type: Sporting aircraft
- National origin: American
- Manufacturer: Monte Warne
- Number built: 1
- Registration: N11TH

History
- Introduction date: 1995

The Bubble Plane was a sporting monoplane constructed by Monte Warne of Tennessee. It was notable for being made using components sourced from several different aircraft.

== Design and development ==
The Bubble Plane was a high-wing pusher monoplane. It was constructed using the fuselage of a pre-owned RLU-1 Breezy, which had been equipped with the wings of a Piper PA-11 lightplane, and the wing-struts from a Piper PA-18, and was powered by a 160 hp (120 kW) Lycoming O-320 engine.

In creating the Bubble Plane, Warne retained those components, but modified the fuselage to increase its length, changed the tandem seating arrangement to being side-by-side, and also replaced the original tricycle undercarriage with one that had a conventional tail-dragger layout. A bubble canopy sourced from a Bell 47 helicopter was located at the front of the fuselage, and provided excellent all-round visibility. A fairing was built between the canopy and the engine. It had capacity to carry up to 200 lb (91 kg) of luggage, and sufficient fuel to fly for 32 hours.

The Bubble Plane was given the FAA registration N11TH, with an airworthiness test taking place in 1995. The registration was kept active through to 2011.

== Specifications ==
Data from Sport Aviation

General characteristics

- Crew: 1
- Capacity: 2
- Empty weight: 1,050 lb (476 kg)
- Gross weight: 1,850 lb (839 kg)
- Fuel capacity: 36 US gal (30 imp gal; 140 L)
- Powerplant: 1 × Lycoming O-320 , 160 hp (120 kW)
- Propellers: 3-bladed IVO Magnum

Performance

- Maximum speed: 115 mph (185 km/h, 100 kn)
- Cruise speed: 90 mph (140 km/h, 78 kn)
- Stall speed: 40 mph (64 km/h, 35 kn)
- Endurance: 32 hours
- Rate of climb: 1,000 ft/min (5.1 m/s)
- Takeoff distance: 200 ft (61 m)
- Landing distance: 300 ft (91 m)

== See also ==
Aircraft of comparable role, configuration, and era

- Edgley Optica
- Wild DoubleEnder
