= Aero Eli Servizi Yo-Yo 222 =

Italian helicopter

Yo-Yo 222

General information
- Type: Helicopter
- National origin: Italy
- Manufacturer: Aero Eli Servizi Costruzioni Aeronautiche
- Status: In production (2015)

The Aero Eli Servizi Yo-Yo 222 (sometimes written YoYo) is an Italian helicopter designed and produced by Aero Eli Servizi of L'Aquila. The aircraft is supplied complete and ready-to-fly.

== Design and development ==
The Yo-Yo 222 was initially designed for a higher gross weight of 495 kg (1,091 lb), but later versions were lightened to allow a gross weight of 450 kg (992 lb) to qualify under the European Class 6 microlight helicopter rules. The aircraft features a single main rotor and tail rotor, a two-seats-in side-by-side configuration enclosed cockpit, skid landing gear and an American-made four-cylinder, air-cooled, four stroke 172 hp (128 kW) Lycoming O-320 engine.

Greatly resembling the Robinson R22, reviewer Werner Pfaendler, describes it as "obviously the result of a close look at the world's bestselling two-seater helicopter, the R22."

For lightness the aircraft fuselage is made with extensive use of carbon fiber reinforced polymer and fibreglass. Its two-bladed rotor has a diameter of 7.66 m (25.1 ft). The initial version of the aircraft has a typical empty weight of 322 kg (710 lb) and a gross weight of 495 kg (1,091 lb), giving a useful load of 173 kg (381 lb). With full fuel of 68 litres (15 imp gal; 18 US gal) the payload for the pilot, passenger and baggage is 124 kg (273 lb).

== Specifications (Yo-Yo 222) ==
Data from Manufacturer and Tacke

General characteristics

- Crew: one
- Capacity: one passenger
- Empty weight: 322 kg (710 lb)
- Gross weight: 495 kg (1,091 lb)
- Fuel capacity: 68 litres (15 imp gal; 18 US gal)
- Powerplant: 1 × Lycoming O-320 four cylinder, air-cooled, four stroke aircraft engine, 128 kW (172 hp)
- Main rotor diameter: 7.66 m (25 ft 2 in)
- Main rotor area: 46 m^{2} (500 sq ft)

Performance

- Maximum speed: 187 km/h (116 mph, 101 kn)
- Cruise speed: 172 km/h (107 mph, 93 kn)
- Range: 690 km (429 mi, 373 nmi)
- Disk loading: 10.8 kg/m^{2} (2.2 lb/sq ft)

== See also ==
- List of rotorcraft
