= Richard 125 Commuter =

125 Commuter

General information
- Type: Homebuilt aircraft
- National origin: United States
- Manufacturer: C.H. Richard Company
- Designer: Charles H Richard
- Number built: 2

History
- Variant: Richard 150 Commuter

The Richard 125 Commuter is a two-passenger homebuilt aircraft design.

== Development ==
The 125 Commuter was introduced in 1969, and a second refined prototype was built in 1972. The aircraft used a stressed skin all aluminum structure at a time when most homebuilts used wood or tube and fabric construction. The plans were marketed for homebuilt construction by its designer Charles Richard. A 150 hp variant was developed afterward.

== Design ==
The 125 Commuter is a side-by-side passenger strut-braced high wing aircraft with conventional landing gear. The aircraft uses all metal construction. A single control column between the seats acts as a control for either pilot. Fuel is stored in 50 gallon wing tanks.

== Variants ==
- Richard 150 Commuter

== Specifications (Richard 125 Commuter) ==
Data from Sport Aviation

General characteristics

- Capacity: 2
- Length: 19.75 ft (6.02 m)
- Wingspan: 25 ft (7.6 m)
- Wing area: 100 sq ft (9.3 m^{2})
- Empty weight: 805 lb (365 kg)
- Gross weight: 1,500 lb (680 kg)
- Fuel capacity: 50 gal
- Powerplant: 1 × Lycoming 0-290G Horizontally opposed piston, 125 hp (93 kW)
- Propellers: 2-bladed

Performance

- Maximum speed: 130 kn (150 mph, 240 km/h)
- Cruise speed: 120 kn (140 mph, 230 km/h)
- Stall speed: 43 kn (50 mph, 80 km/h)
- Service ceiling: 15,000 ft (4,600 m)

== See also ==
Aircraft of comparable role, configuration, and era

- Richard 150 Commuter
