= Velocity V-Twin =

American homebuilt aircraft

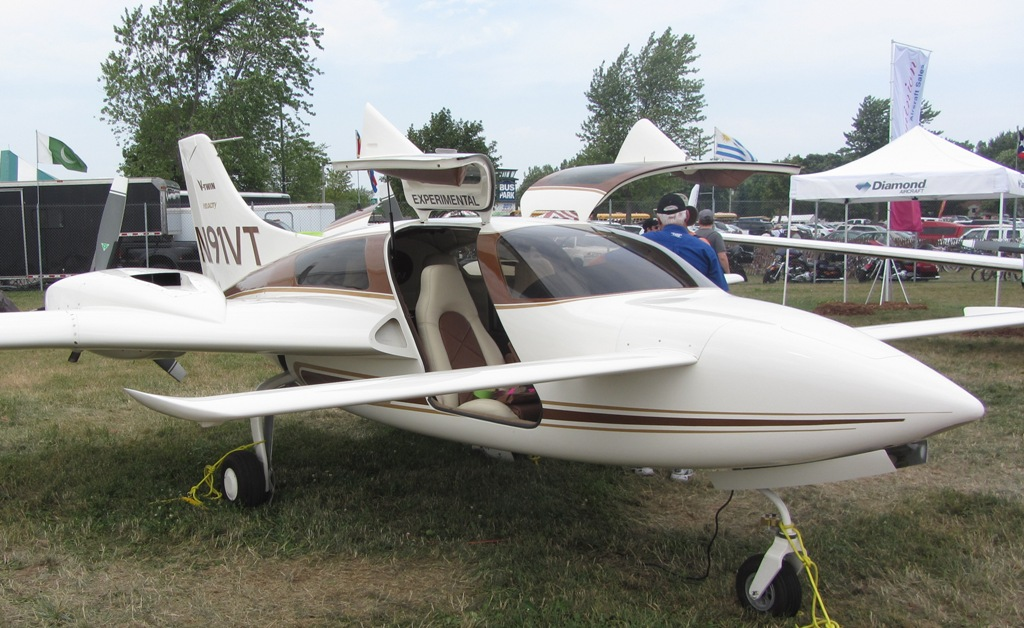

General information
- Type: Homebuilt aircraft
- National origin: United States
- Manufacturer: Velocity Aircraft
- Designer: Duane Swing
- Number built: 27

History
- First flight: 13 March 2012
- Developed from: Velocity XL

The Velocity V-Twin is an American twin engined, homebuilt aircraft, designed by Velocity Aircraft and following the layout of their earlier Velocity XL but with a single vertical tail. It is the flagship model of the Velocity Aircraft Line.

== Development ==
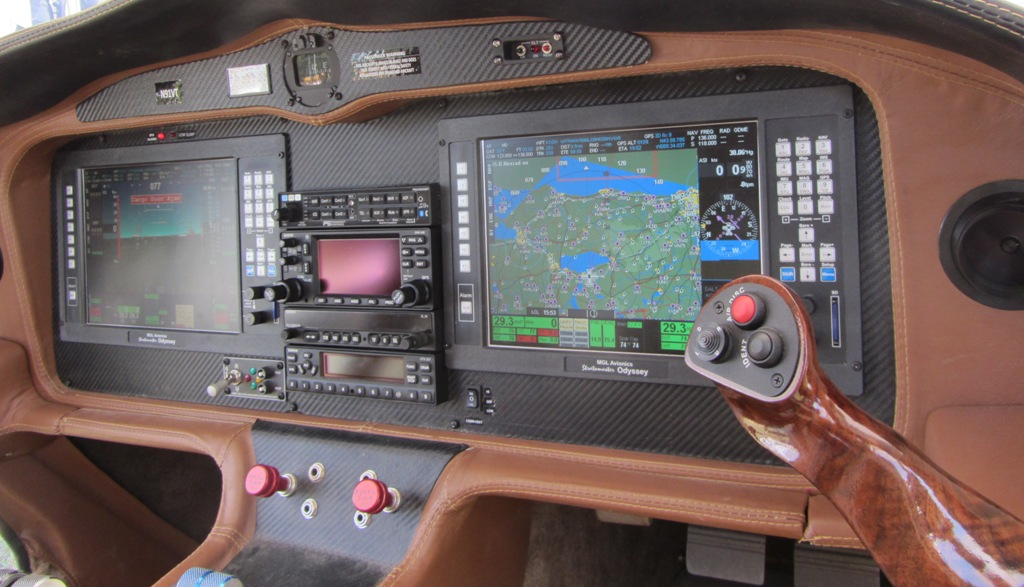
Instrument panel of the V-Twin

The Velocity V-Twin is a four-seat (with a five-seat option), retractable tricycle landing gear, composite construction aircraft with a twin engine pusher configuration and the canard layout of the Velocity XL single engine aircraft. Its fuselage is that of the XL-RG, with the addition of the single, vertical surface which replaces the twin end plate fins of the smaller XL.

The aircraft features "gull wing" car-like doors and dual sidestick controllers. The flight control surfaces are the same as those of the XL. The aircraft's design goal was to offer the safety of twin engines without the stall and spin risks of a conventional twin during single-engine operations. The rear-facing pusher propellers are mounted close together where the fuselage cross-section tapers, reducing asymmetrical single-engine thrust yawing compared to conventional twin-engine aircraft.

The prototype was first flown on 13 March 2012 and appeared at Sun 'n Fun the following month.

== Specifications (V-Twin) ==
Data from Jane's All the World's Aircraft 2013/14

General characteristics

- Crew: 1
- Capacity: 3 or 4 passengers
- Wingspan: 34 ft 0 in (10.36 m)
- Empty weight: 2,000 lb (907 kg)
- Gross weight: 3,200 lb (1,451 kg)
- Fuel capacity: 100 U.S. gallons (380 L; 83 imp gal)
- Powerplant: 2 × Lycoming IO-320 4 horizontally opposed piston engines, 160 hp (120 kW) each
- Propellers: 3-bladed MT Propeller

Performance

- Cruise speed: 175 kn (201 mph, 323 km/h) economical
- Range: 1,400 nmi (1,611 mi, 2,593 km) economical cruise
- Rate of climb: 2,000 ft/min (10 m/s) at sea level
- Wing loading: 21 lb/sq ft (100 kg/m^{2})

== See also ==
Aircraft of comparable role, configuration, and era

- Rutan Defiant Push-Pull twin canard composite homebuilt
- AAC Angel Pusher twin
