= SME Aero Tiga =

Training aircraft

Aero Tiga, MD-3 Swiss Trainer
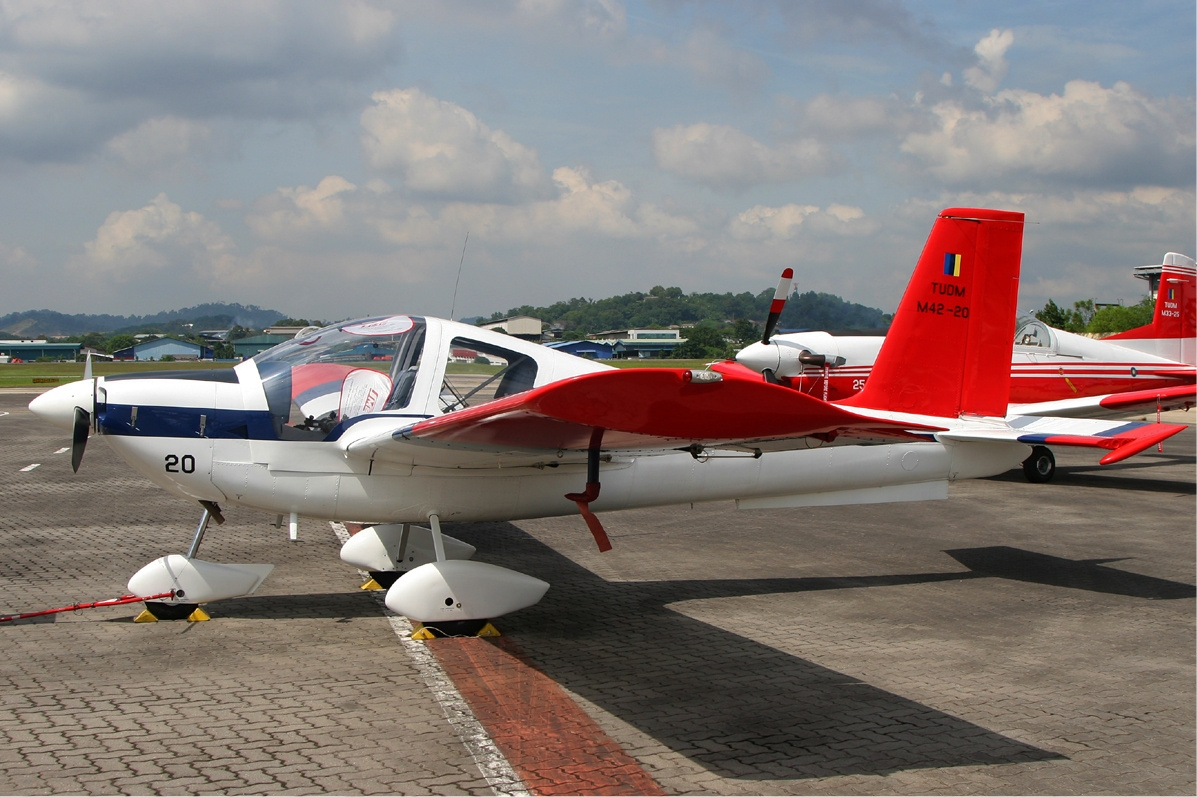
- Aero Tiga of the Royal Malaysian Air Force

General information
- Type: Trainer
- Manufacturer: Dätwyler, SME Aerospace
- Status: In service
- Primary user: Royal Malaysian Air Force; Indonesian Civil Aviation Institute
- Number built: 100

History
- First flight: 12 August 1983

The SME Aero Tiga, originally the Dätwyler MD-3 Swiss Trainer is a trainer aircraft developed in Switzerland through the 1960s and 70s, and which first flew in 1983.

== History ==
In 1993, all rights to the design were acquired by SME Aerospace, who began to produce it as the Aero Tiga shortly thereafter, having received orders for 20 by the Royal Malaysian Air Force. The first two of these were delivered in 1995, and the order was increased to 60 aircraft the following year. SME Aerospace also received orders for 20 aircraft for the Indonesian government's flight training center at Curug, as part of a deal by the Malaysian government to acquire IPTN CN-235 transports.

== Design and development ==
In configuration, the Swiss Trainer is a mid-wing, cantilever monoplane with fixed spatted tricycle undercarriage. Accommodation for the pilot and instructor was provided as side-by-side seats under an expansive bubble canopy. The four-cylinder horizontally opposed piston engine drove a fixed two-blade propeller.

While the layout of the aircraft was entirely orthodox, its construction was not, as the Swiss Trainer was designed to be as modular as possible to lower the cost and complexity of production and maintenance. To this end, as many parts were made interchangeable as possible. For example, all nine control surfaces (two ailerons, four flap segments, two elevators, and the rudder) are the same part that can be fitted to any of these locations with minimal modification. Both halves of the horizontal stabiliser and the fin can similarly be interchanged, and most of the left and right wings is common to both. The aircraft features an unusual exhaust that spans the entire length of the underside of the fuselage. Entry is through a forward sliding canopy that also includes the wing root fairing.

== Operators ==
Indonesia

- Indonesian Civil Aviation Institute (id) – 20 in service

Malaysia

- Royal Malaysian Air Force – 20 (retired)

== Specifications (MD3-160 AeroTiga) ==
Data from Brassey's World Aircraft & Systems Directory 1999/2000

General characteristics

- Crew: Two, pilot and instructor
- Length: 7.10 m (23 ft 3.63 in)
- Wingspan: 10.00 m (32 ft 9.63 in)
- Height: 2.90 m (9 ft 7 in)
- Wing area: 15.0 m^{2} (161.5 sq ft)
- Aspect ratio: 6.67:1
- Empty weight: 670 kg (1,477 lb)
- Gross weight: 920 kg (2,028 lb)
- Powerplant: 1 × Lycoming O-320-D2A , 119 kW (160 hp)

Performance

- Maximum speed: 254 km/h (158 mph, 137 kn)
- Cruise speed: 228 km/h (142 mph, 123 kn)
- Range: 919 km (571 mi, 496 nmi)
- Endurance: 4 hours 9.6 minutes
- Rate of climb: 5.6 m/s (1,102 ft/min)

== See also ==
Aircraft of comparable role, configuration, and era

- Piper Tomahawk
- Beechcraft Skipper
- Cessna 152
