= Velocity, Inc. =

American kit aircraft manufacturing company

- Type: Private company
- Industry: Aerospace
- Founded: 1984
- Founder: Danny Maher
- Headquarters: Sebastian, Florida, United States
- Products: Kit aircraft
- Owner: Swing family
- Number of employees: 20
- Website: www.velocityaircraft.com

Velocity, Inc. is an American kit aircraft manufacturer.

The company was founded in 1984 by Danny Maher, marketing a four-seat homebuilt aircraft based on the Long-EZ design. The first prototype flew in 1985. The company was sold to Scott and Duane Swing in 1992. In 1995, the cockpit design was changed, adding a gull wing door design.

In 2008, a power failure and crash of a Velocity undergoing initial testing at North Las Vegas Airport brought national attention to homebuilt aircraft testing. Banning of particular aircraft and flight operations at the airport afterward resulted in a power struggle over who has authority over airspace and access to public use airports.

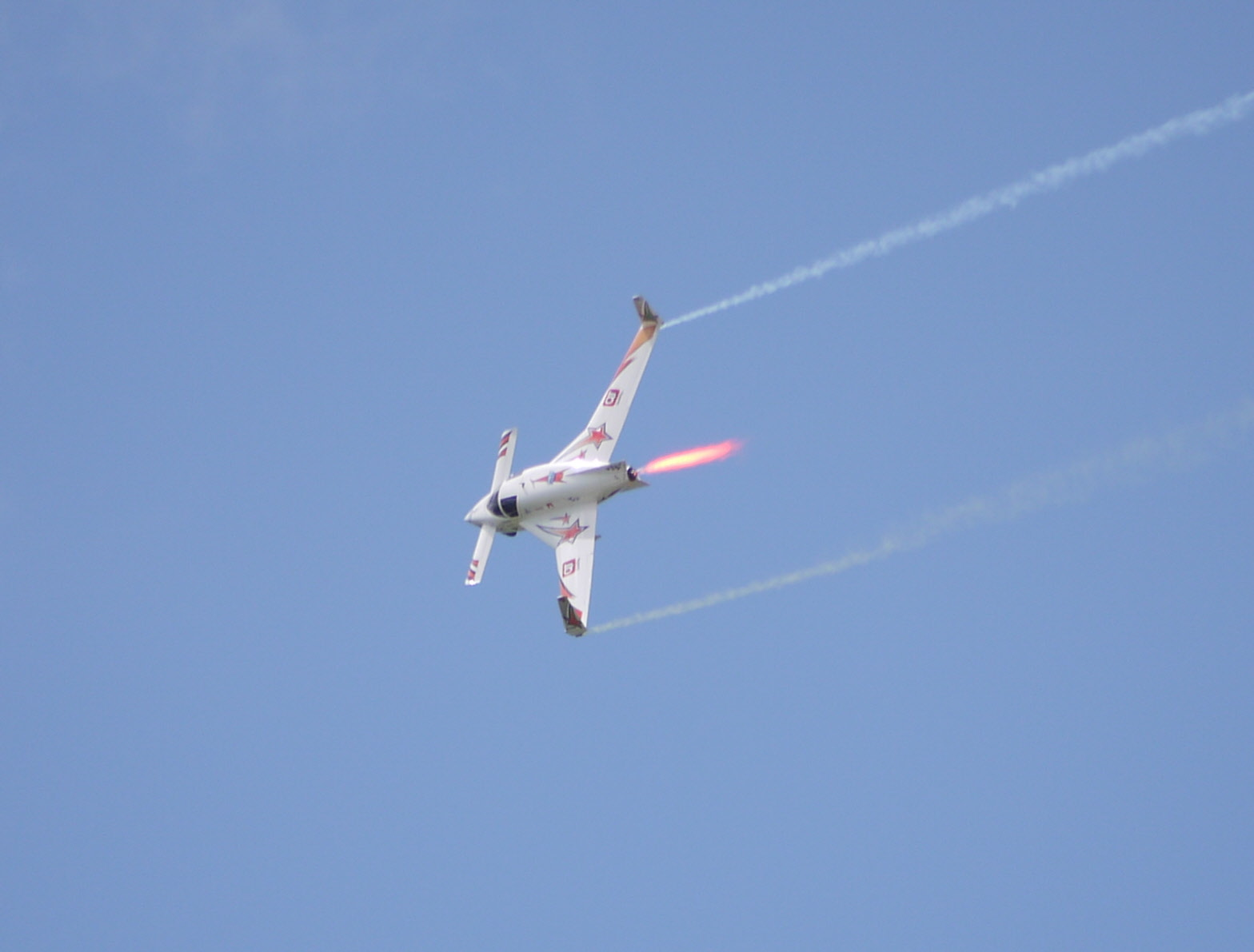
Rocket Racer at Tulsa International Airport, April 2010

In 2008, Velocity received an order for 20 of its XL-5 aircraft to participate in the Rocket Racing League.

On April 14, 2008, the Racing Rocket Racing Composite Corporation, a subsidiary of the Rocket Racing League, acquired Velocity Aircraft. The RRL announced their goal was to "produce an airframe that will be consistent for all competing Rocket Racers."

On May 26, 2010, Scott and Duane Swing bought back full ownership of Velocity Inc from the Rocket Racing League.

== Aircraft ==
=== History ===
Danny Maher designed and built the first Velocity in 1985. First Flight was in October 1985. The plane was debuted at Sun-N-Fun in 1986. Danny's intention was to design a plane that was much like the Long-EZ with a larger, more comfortable interior.

In 1992, Velocity introduced the "173", also known as the long wing. This model had a longer wing, giving it a lower landing speed. The name was a play on the name of a popular model of Cessna, the Cessna 172, the idea being it is one better. Some flying Velocity planes experienced "deep stall" incidents, where the main wing stalled before the canard, causing an unrecoverable stall. After a lengthy investigation, Velocity found and solved the cause of these stalls. The 173 included airfoil modifications that prevented the deep stall. The original kit was also modified to prevent a deep stall, and was now known as the Standard model.

In 1995, Velocity introduced the gull-wing doors, calling the plane the Standard Elite (abbreviated to "SE").

In 1986, Scott and Duane Swing purchased a Velocity kit. They developed a retractable gear option for it, and began selling it as an add-on. When the Swings purchased Velocity from Danny in 1992, their retractable gear became a factory option to the kit.

In March 1997, Velocity introduced the XL model, which features a larger cabin and space for a larger engine.

The XL-5, sometimes called a "dash five", was introduced in 2004. It reduced the size of the keel down the center of the cabin, giving more room in the back seat.

Velocity has developed a twin-engine model called the Velocity V-Twin. The prototype's first flight was on March 3, 2012, and the model was made available for sale in early 2013. A video is available on the official website.

=== Current models ===
Aircraft produced
Model name	First flight	Number built	Type
Velocity SE		268	Canard homebuilt
Velocity XL		190	Large fuselage canard homebuilt
Velocity XL5		86	5-seat canard homebuilt
Velocity TXL		18	Turbocharged canard homebuilt
Velocity V-Twin		27	4-5 seat twin engine canard homebuilt
Velocity Turbo		1	6-place prototype canard turboprop
