= Fly-Fan Shark =

Slovak light aircraft

Shark
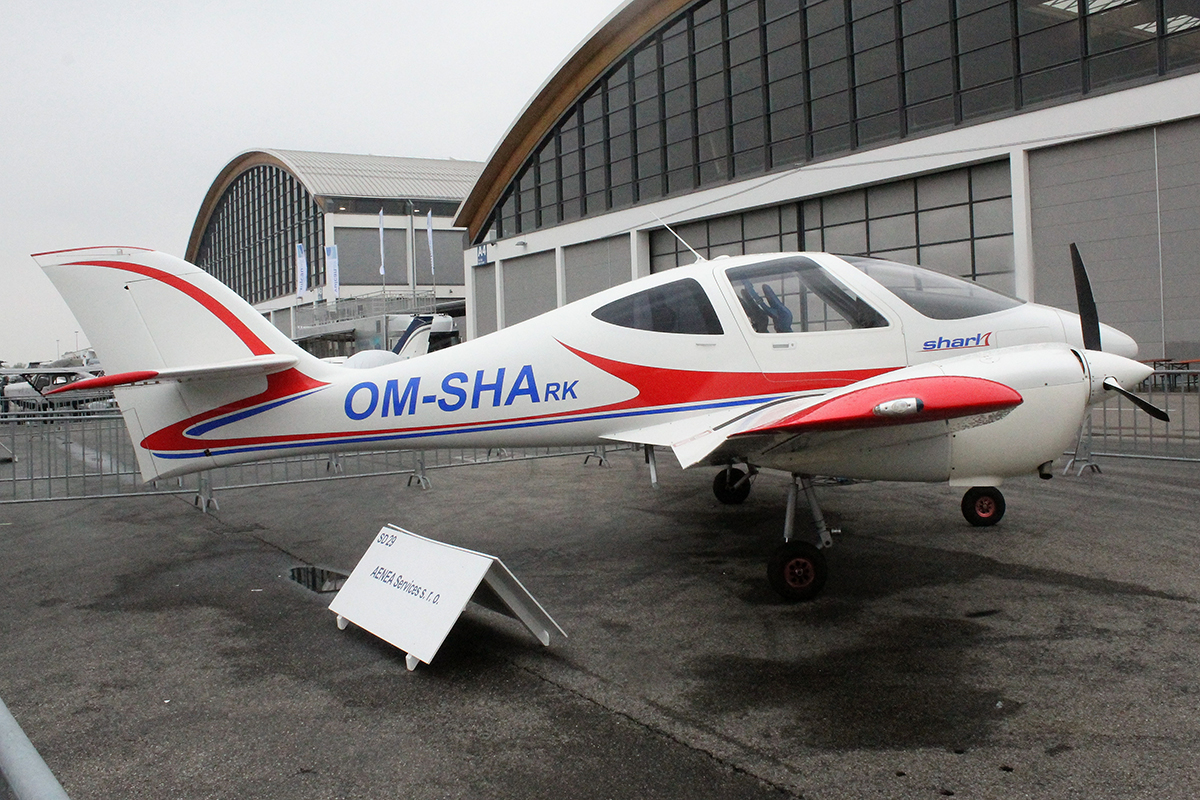

General information
- Type: Light aircraft
- National origin: Slovakia
- Manufacturer: Fly-Fan, AENEA Services
- Designer: Frantisek Sustek
- Status: Under development (2015)

History
- First flight: 29 June 2011

The Fly-Fan Shark is a Slovak light aircraft designed by Frantisek Sustek and initially developed by Fly-Fan of Trenčín. Development continues under the new owner of the design, AENEA Services. The design was introduced at the AERO Friedrichshafen show in 2007 as a mock up and in 2011 as a flying aircraft. The aircraft first flew on 29 June 2011 and is intended to be supplied as a complete ready-to-fly-aircraft.

== Design and development ==
The Shark was designed with the goal of providing similar performance to other twin-engined light aircraft, but on 30% less power. It features a cantilever low-wing, a five-seat enclosed cabin, retractable tricycle landing gear and twin wing-mounted engines in tractor configuration.

The aircraft is made from Kevlar and carbon fibre. Its 11.4 m (37.4 ft) span wing employs a Jd 16 (40) 162 airfoil at the wing root, transitioning to a Jd 17 (40) 157 at mid-span and a Jd 15 (35) 136 at the wing tip. The wing has an area of 16.2 m^{2} (174 sq ft) and mounts split flaps that can be extended 50°. The standard engines fitted are a pair of 160 hp (119 kW) Lycoming O-320-D1A four-stroke powerplants.

The aircraft has an empty weight of 1,221 kg (2,692 lb) and a gross weight of 1,500 kg (3,300 lb), giving a useful load of 279 kg (615 lb).

== Specifications (Shark) ==
Data from Bayerl and Fly-Fan

General characteristics

- Crew: one
- Capacity: four passengers
- Length: 8.9 m (29 ft 2 in)
- Wingspan: 11.4 m (37 ft 5 in)
- Height: 3.07 m (10 ft 1 in)
- Wing area: 16.2 m^{2} (174 sq ft)
- Airfoil: wing root: Jd 16 (40) 162 airfoil, mid-span: Jd 17 (40) 157, wing tip: Jd 15 (35) 136
- Empty weight: 1,221 kg (2,692 lb)
- Gross weight: 1,500 kg (3,307 lb)
- Powerplant: 2 × Lycoming O-320-D1A four cylinder, air-cooled, four stroke aircraft engine, 120 kW (160 hp) each
- Propellers: 3-bladed MT-Propeller or Hartzell Propeller constant speed, 1.78 m (5 ft 10 in) diameter

Performance

- Cruise speed: 260 km/h (160 mph, 140 kn)
- Stall speed: 140 km/h (87 mph, 76 kn)
- Never exceed speed: 330 km/h (210 mph, 180 kn)
- Range: 1,600 km (990 mi, 860 nmi)
- Endurance: 8 hours
- Maximum glide ratio: 16:1 at 160 km/h (99 mph)
- Rate of climb: 10.6 m/s (2,090 ft/min)
- Wing loading: 92.6 kg/m^{2} (19.0 lb/sq ft)
