= Custom Flight =

Canadian aircraft manufacturer

Custom Flight Ltd.
- Company type: Privately held company
- Industry: Aerospace
- Headquarters: Tiny, Ontario, Canada
- Key people: Morgan Williams
- Products: Light aircraft
- Website: www.customflightltd.com

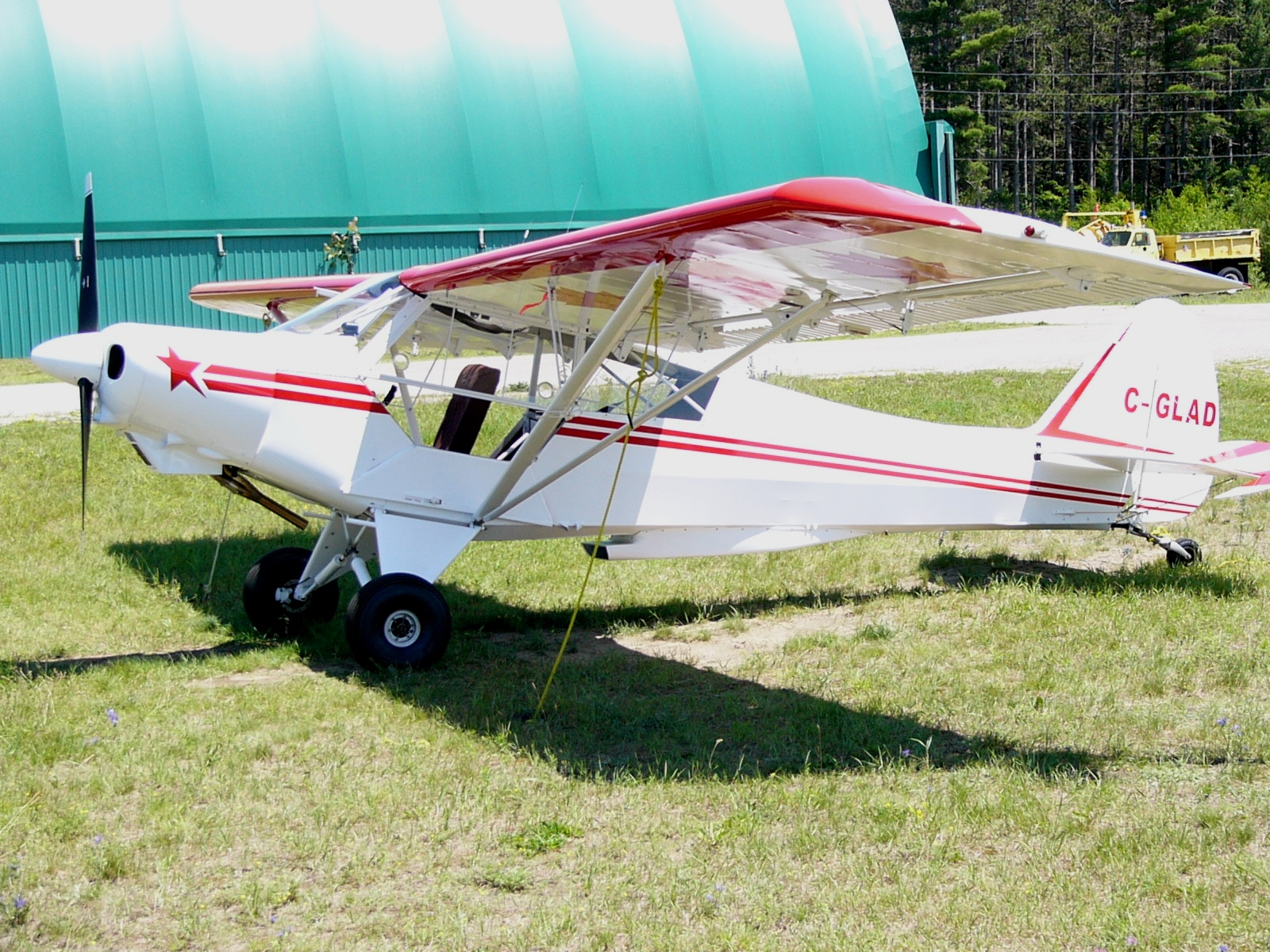
Custom Flight North Star

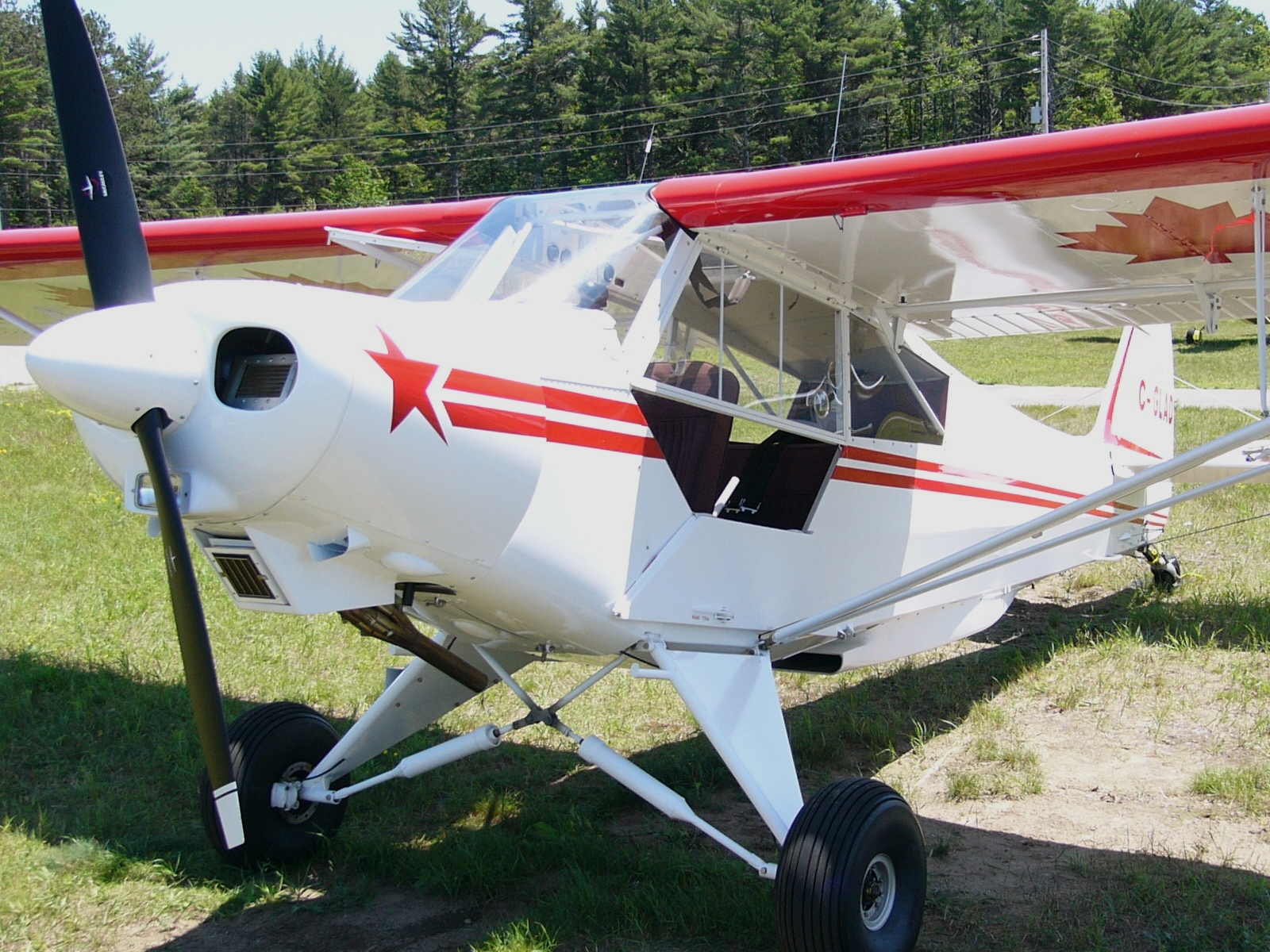
Custom Flight North Star.

Custom Flight Ltd is a Canadian aircraft manufacturer based in Tiny, Ontario that was founded by Morgan Williams. Its address was formerly Perkinsfield, Ontario in the late 1990s. The company specializes in the design and manufacture of light aircraft in the form of kits for amateur construction and ready-to-fly light-sport aircraft.

Williams had rebuilt Piper PA-18 Super Cubs before, but thought that the design could be improved upon and so he created a fresh design that incorporated the best of the Super Cub and corrected its deficiencies. This aircraft was marketed as the Custom Flight North Star with at least 24 examples having been flown by 2016.

The Custom Flight Lite Star is a smaller, lighter aircraft for the light-sport aircraft market, although as of September 2014, the design does not appear on the Federal Aviation Administration's list of approved special light-sport aircraft.

The company also provides general computer-aided design and computer-aided manufacturing services as well as powder coating.

== Aircraft ==
Summary of aircraft built by Custom Flight
Model name	First flight	Number built	Type
Custom Flight North Star		24	light aircraft
Custom Flight Lite Star		2	light-sport aircraft
