= SME Aerospace =

Malaysian defence company

SME Aerospace Sdn Bhd
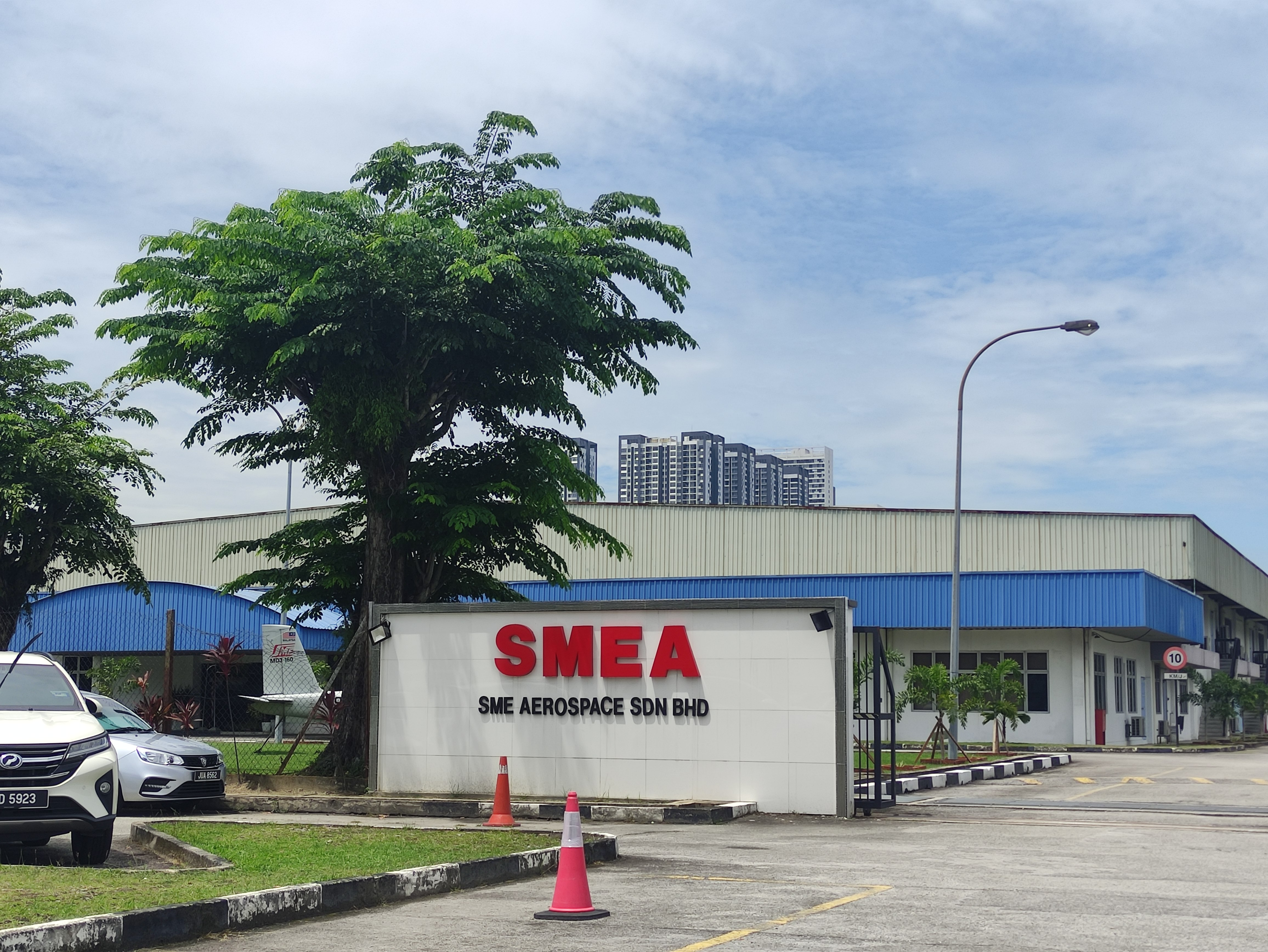
- Company type: Private Limited Company
- Industry: Aerospace; Defence
- Founded: 1992; 34 years ago
- Headquarters: Sungai Buloh, Selangor, Malaysia
- Products: Aircraft, aircraft pylon, fuselage part

The SME Aerospace Sdn Bhd (SMEA), is a Malaysian defence company in aerospace section that specialises in the manufacturing of aircraft and its parts. The company is located in Sungai Buloh, Selangor and it is a subsidiary company of National Aerospace and Defence Industries Sdn Bhd.

== History ==
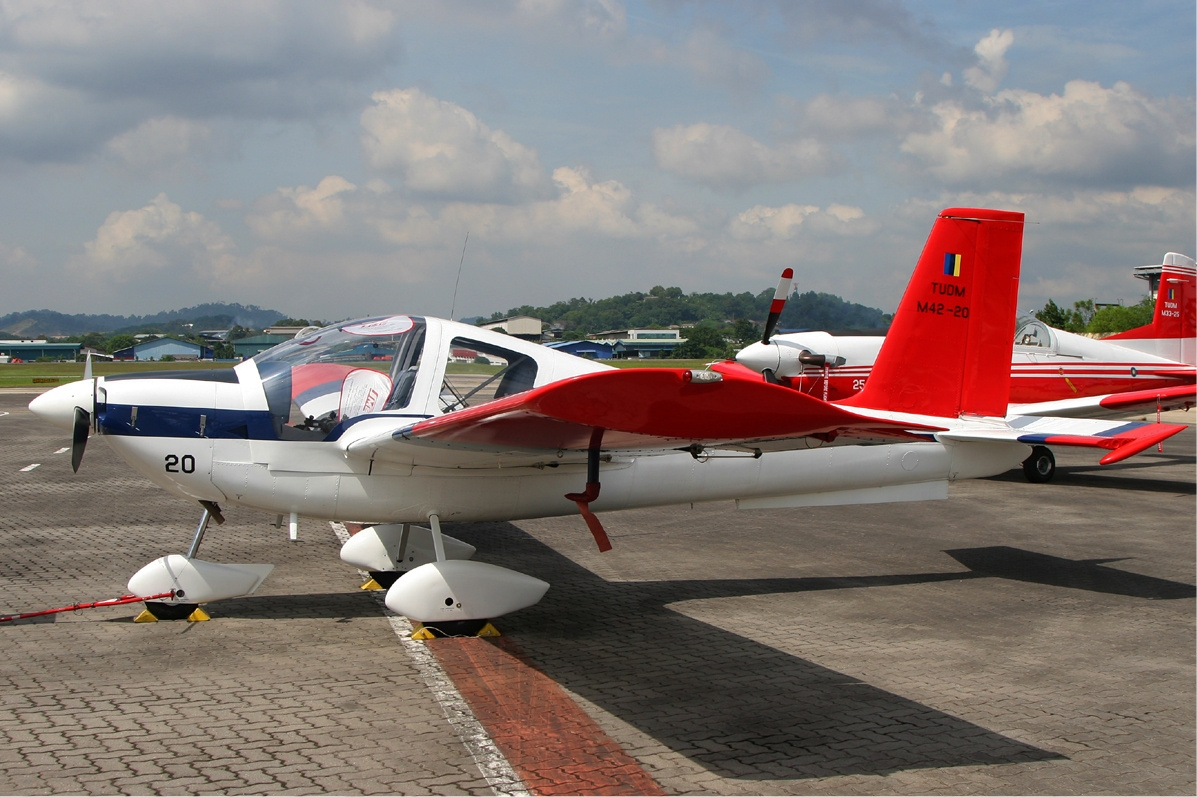
SME Aero Tiga manufactured by SME Aerospace

The company founded in 1992 through the offset program from the United Kingdom after the government of Malaysia agreed to purchase BAE Systems Hawk fighter aircraft. In 1993, SME Aerospace moving forward in aerospace industry by acquired the design rights of MD-3 Swiss Trainer aircraft from the Dätwyler of Switzerland. This trainer aircraft manufactured locally and called SME Aero Tiga. SME Aerospace succeed in selling their trainer aircraft to the Royal Malaysian Air Force and Indonesian Civil Aviation Institute.

SME Aerospace also part of global supplier of composites aero structures and aircraft parts for the Airbus including Airbus A320, Airbus A330, Airbus A350 XWB, Airbus A380 and components for Airbus Helicopters.

In 2015, BAE Systems awarded SME Aerospace a contract to supply pylons for the BAE Hawk AJT aircraft. Under the contract, the company will manufacture and supply 16 inboard and 16 outboard pylons for the BAE System's export customers.

== Products ==
- SME Aero Tiga aircraft.
- Metal-based parts and components for the conventional aircraft including Airbus A320, Airbus A330, Airbus A350 XWB, Airbus A380 and components for Airbus Helicopters.
- Pylon components for the military aircraft including BAE Hawk AJT.

== See also ==
- SME Ordnance - Sister company
