= Wickham Model C Sunbird =

General information
- Type: Homebuilt aircraft
- National origin: United States
- Designer: Jim Wickham
- Status: Under Restoration
- Number built: 1

History
- First flight: 1975

The Wickham Model C Sunbird is a single-seat homebuilt aircraft designed by Boeing engineer James M. Wickham.

== Design ==
The Sunbird is a single-place low wing taildragger made primarily of wood. Power was originally a 1600cc VW, but a Continental C85 was installed later in its life.

== Operational history ==
The Wickham C was the third of six designs by Wickham, which first flew in 1975.

== Specifications ==
Data from Original drawings

General characteristics

- Capacity: 1
- Length: 16 ft 6 in (5.03 m)
- Wingspan: 20 ft 2 in (6.15 m)
- Wing area: 69 sq ft (6.4 m^{2})

Performance

== See also ==
Related development

- Wickham B
- Wickham A Bluebird
