= Lycoming O-320 =

American aircraft engine

O-320
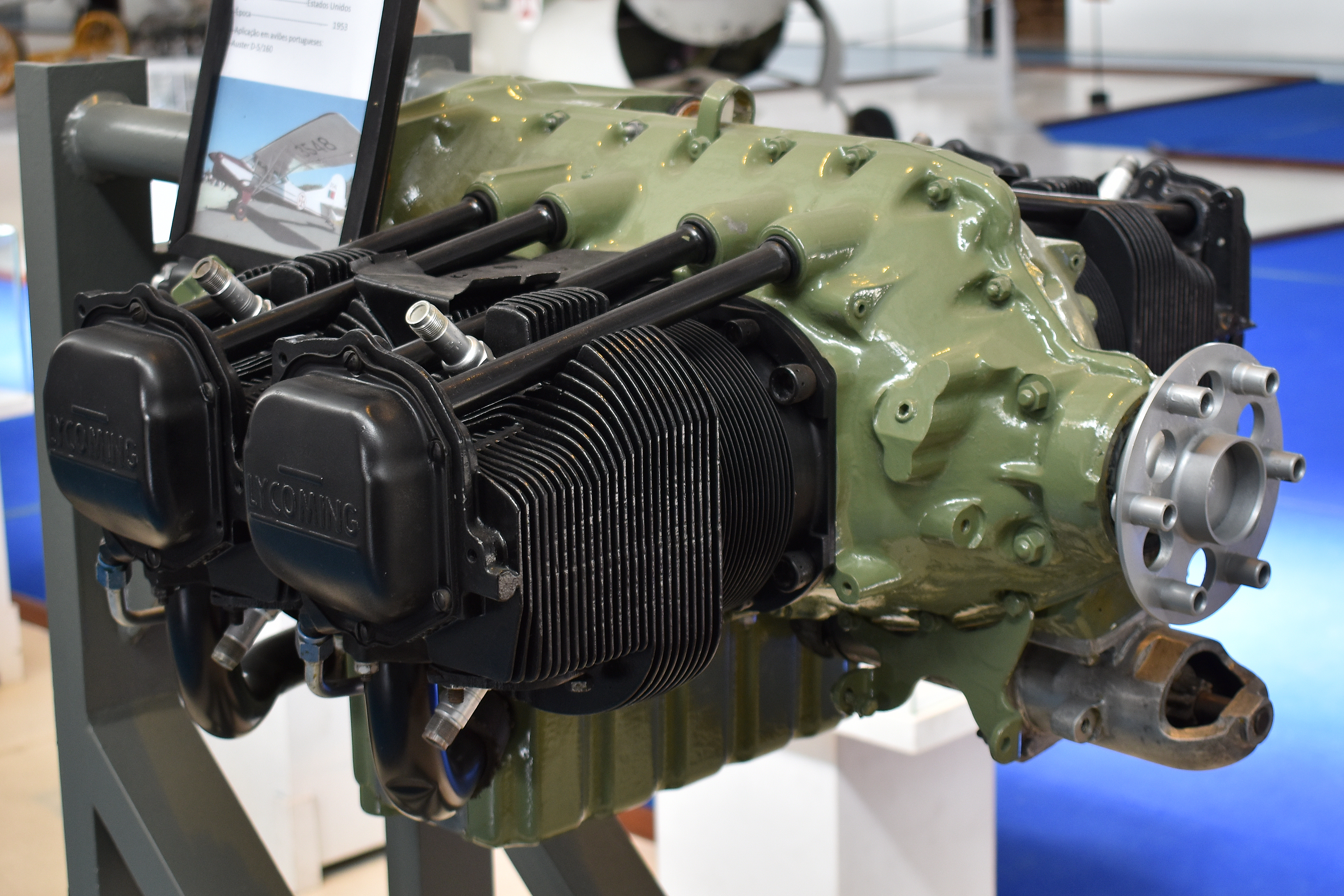
- A Lycoming O-320 on display at the Museu do Ar
- Type: Piston aero-engine
- National origin: United States
- Manufacturer: Lycoming Engines
- Major applications: Cessna 172; Piper PA-28 Cherokee; Piper PA-18-150 Super Cub
- Manufactured: 1953–present

The Lycoming O-320 is a large family of naturally aspirated, 320 cu in (5.2 L) air-cooled, horizontally-opposed four-cylinder, direct-drive engines produced by Lycoming Engines. Introduced in 1953, it is commonly used on light aircraft such as the Cessna 172 and Piper Cherokee, and remains in production as of 2026. Different variants are rated for 150 or 160 horsepower (112 or 119 kilowatts).

== Design and development ==
The O-320 family of engines includes the carbureted O-320, the fuel-injected IO-320, the inverted mount, fuel-injected AIO-320 and the aerobatic, fuel-injected AEIO-320 series. The LIO-320 is a "left-handed" version with the crankshaft rotating in the opposite direction for use on twin-engined aircraft to eliminate the critical engine.

The first O-320 (with no suffix) was FAA certified on 28 July 1953 to CAR 13 effective 5 March 1952; this same engine was later re-designated, without change, as the O-320-A1A. The first IO-320 was certified on 10 April 1961, with the AIO-320 following on 23 June 1969 and the first aerobatic AEIO-320 on 12 April 1974. The LIO-320s were both certified on 28 August 1969.

The O-320 family of engines externally resembles the Lycoming O-235 and O-290 family from which they were derived. The O-320 shares the same 3.875 in (98 mm) stroke as the smaller engines, but produces more power with the bore increased to 5.125 in (130 mm). The design uses hydraulic tappets and incorporates the provisions for a hydraulically controlled propeller installation as well. The controllable-pitch propeller models use a different crankshaft from those intended for fixed-pitch propellers.

The O-320 uses a conventional wet sump system for lubrication. The main bearings, connecting rods, camshaft bearings, tappets and pushrods are all pressure lubricated, while the piston pins, cylinder walls and gears are all lubricated by spray. The oil system is pressurized by an accessory-drive mounted oil pump. A remotely mounted oil cooler is used, connected to the engine by flexible hoses.

The 150 hp (112 kW) versions of the carbureted O-320, are approved for the use of 87 AKI automotive gasoline. Models with 9.0:1 compression ratio are not approved, such as the H2AD model. All other 160 hp (119 kW) 0-320s are approved for 91 AKI. Airframe approval is also necessary to use automotive gasoline in any certified aircraft.

The factory retail price of the O-320 varies by model. In 2010 the retail price of an O-320-B1A purchased outright was USD$47,076

== Variants ==
=== O-320 series ===
O-320 (No suffix) later redesignated O-320-A1A
150 hp (112 kW) at 2,700 rpm, Minimum fuel grade 80/87 avgas, compression ratio 7.00:1. Provisions for a controllable-pitch propeller and 25-degree spark advance.
O-320-A1B
150 hp (112 kW) at 2,700 rpm, Minimum fuel grade 80/87 avgas, compression ratio 7.00:1. Same as A1A but with straight riser in oil sump and -32 carburetor.
O-320-A2A
150 hp (112 kW) at 2,700 rpm, Minimum fuel grade 80/87 avgas, compression ratio 7.00:1. Same as A1A but with fixed-pitch propeller.
O-320-A2B
150 hp (112 kW) at 2,700 rpm, Minimum fuel grade 80/87 avgas, compression ratio 7.00:1. Same as A2A but with straight riser in oil sump and -32 carburetor.
O-320-A2C
150 hp (112 kW) at 2,700 rpm, Minimum fuel grade 80/87 avgas, compression ratio 7.00:1. Same as A2B but with retard breaker magnetos.
O-320-A2D
150 hp (112 kW) at 2,700 rpm, Minimum fuel grade 80/87 avgas, compression ratio 7.00:1. Same as E3D but with conical mounts.
O-320-A3A
150 hp (112 kW) at 2,700 rpm, Minimum fuel grade 80/87 avgas, compression ratio 7.00:1. Same as A1A but with 7/16" prop bolts.
O-320-A3B
150 hp (112 kW) at 2,700 rpm, Minimum fuel grade 80/87 avgas, compression ratio 7.00:1. Same as A3A but with straight riser in oil sump and -32 carburetor.
O-320-A3C
150 hp (112 kW) at 2,700 rpm, Minimum fuel grade 80/87 avgas, compression ratio 7.00:1. Same as A3B but with retard breaker magnetos.

O-320-B1A
160 hp (119 kW) at 2,700 rpm, Minimum fuel grade 100/130 or 91/96 avgas, compression ratio 8.50:1. Same as A1A but with high compression pistons.
O-320-B1B
160 hp (119 kW) at 2,700 rpm, Minimum fuel grade 100/130 or 91/96 avgas, compression ratio 8.50:1. Same as B1A but with straight riser in oil sump and -32 carburetor.
O-320-B2A
160 hp (119 kW) at 2,700 rpm, Minimum fuel grade 100/130 or 91/96 avgas, compression ratio 8.50:1. Same as B1A but with fixed-pitch propeller provisions.
O-320-B2B
160 hp (119 kW) at 2,700 rpm, Minimum fuel grade 100/130 or 91/96 avgas, compression ratio 8.50:1. Same as B2A but with straight riser in oil sump and -32 carburetor.

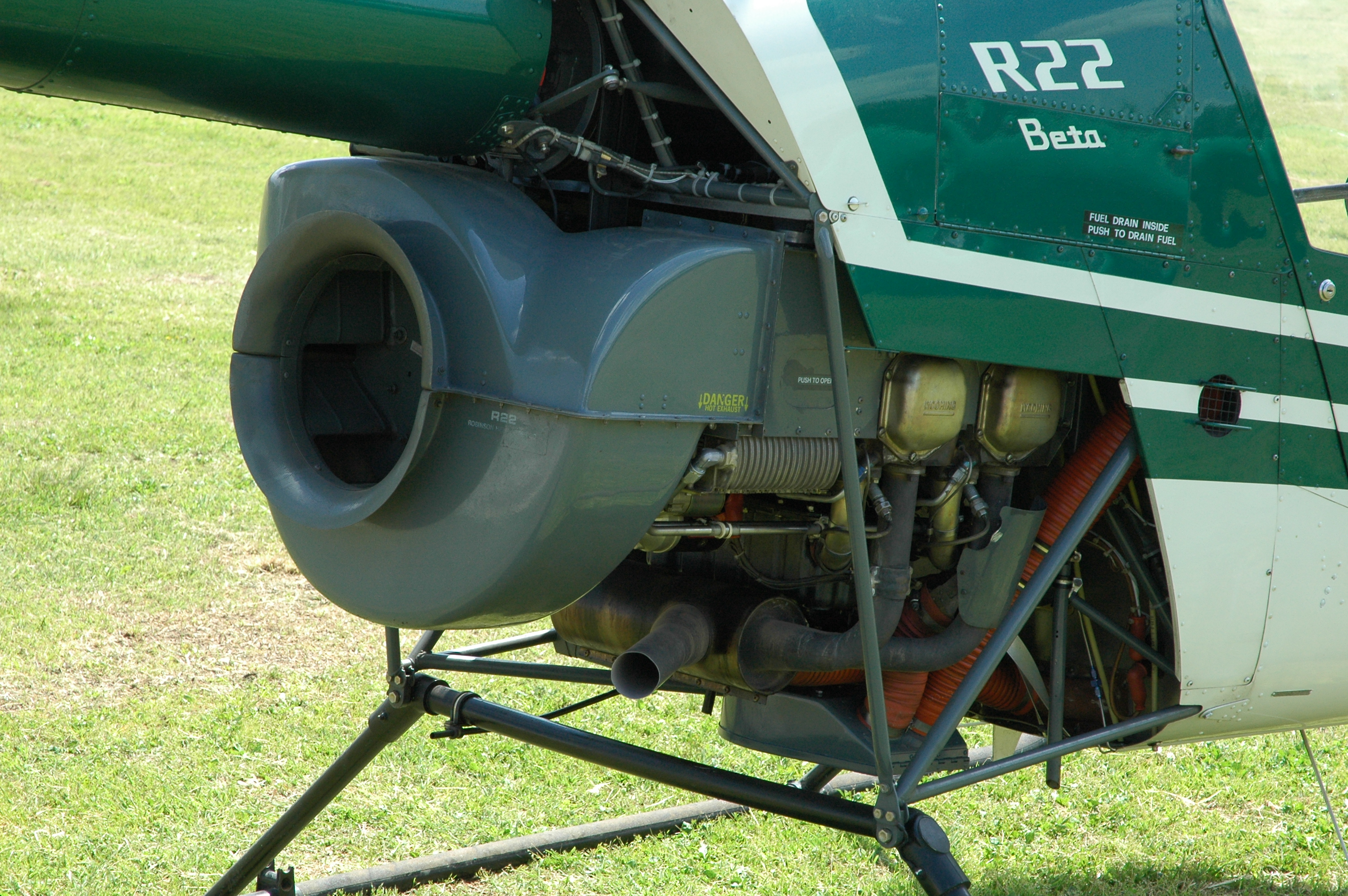
An O-320-B2C mounted in a Robinson R22 helicopter

O-320-B2C
160 hp (119 kW) at 2,700 rpm, Minimum fuel grade 100/130 or 91/96 avgas, compression ratio 8.50:1. Same as B2B but with retard breaker magnetos.
O-320-B2D
160 hp (119 kW) at 2,700 rpm, Minimum fuel grade 91/96 avgas, compression ratio 8.50:1. Same as D1D but with conical engine mounts and no propeller governor.
O-320-B2E
160 hp (119 kW) at 2,700 rpm, Minimum fuel grade 91/96 avgas, compression ratio 8.50:1. Same as B2B except the carburetor is in the same location as the O-320-D models.
O-320-B3A
160 hp (119 kW) at 2,700 rpm, Minimum fuel grade 100/130 or 91/96 avgas, compression ratio 8.50:1. Same as B1A but with 7/16 inch propeller bolts.
O-320-B3B
160 hp (119 kW) at 2,700 rpm, Minimum fuel grade 100/130 or 91/96 avgas, compression ratio 8.50:1. Same as B1A but with 7/16 inch propeller bolts, a straight riser in oil sump, and -32 carburetor.
O-320-B3C
160 hp (119 kW) at 2,700 rpm, Minimum fuel grade 100/130 or 91/96 avgas, compression ratio 8.50:1. Same as B3B but with retard breaker magnetos.

O-320-C1A
150 hp (112 kW) at 2,700 rpm, Minimum fuel grade 80/87 avgas, compression ratio 7.00:1. Low compression version converted through field conversion of B1A.
O-320-C1B
150 hp (112 kW) at 2,700 rpm, Minimum fuel grade 80/87 avgas, compression ratio 7.00:1. Low compression version converted through field conversion of B1B.
O-320-C2A
150 hp (112 kW) at 2,700 rpm, Minimum fuel grade 80/87 avgas, compression ratio 7.00:1. Low compression version converted through field conversion of B2A.
O-320-C2B
150 hp (112 kW) at 2,700 rpm, Minimum fuel grade 80/87 avgas, compression ratio 7.00:1. Low compression version converted through field conversion of B2B.
O-320-C2C
150 hp (112 kW) at 2,700 rpm, Minimum fuel grade 80/87 avgas, compression ratio 7.00:1. Low compression version converted through field conversion of B2C.
O-320-C3A
150 hp (112 kW) at 2,700 rpm, Minimum fuel grade 80/87 avgas, compression ratio 7.00:1. Low compression version converted through field conversion of B3A.
O-320-C3B
150 hp (112 kW) at 2,700 rpm, Minimum fuel grade 80/87 avgas, compression ratio 7.00:1. Low compression version converted through field conversion of B3B.
O-320-C3C
150 hp (112 kW) at 2,700 rpm, Minimum fuel grade 80/87 avgas, compression ratio 7.00:1. Low compression version converted through field conversion of B3C.

O-320-D1A
160 hp (119 kW) at 2,700 rpm, Minimum fuel grade 100/130 or 91/96 avgas, compression ratio 8.50:1. Same as B3B but with Type 1 dynafocal mounts.
O-320-D1B
160 hp (119 kW) at 2,700 rpm, Minimum fuel grade 100/130 or 91/96 avgas, compression ratio 8.50:1. Same as D1A but with retard breaker magnetos.
O-320-D1C
160 hp (119 kW) at 2,700 rpm, Minimum fuel grade 100/130 or 91/96 avgas, compression ratio 8.50:1. Same as D2C but with provisions for a controllable propeller,
O-320-D1D
160 hp (119 kW) at 2,700 rpm, Minimum fuel grade 91/96 avgas, compression ratio 8.50:1. Same as the D1A but with Slick instead of Bendix magnetos and a horizontal carburetor and induction housing. This model was used in the Gulfstream American GA-7 Cougar twin.
O-320-D1F
160 hp (119 kW) at 2,700 rpm, Minimum fuel grade 91/96 avgas, compression ratio 8.50:1. Same as E1F except with high compression pistons.

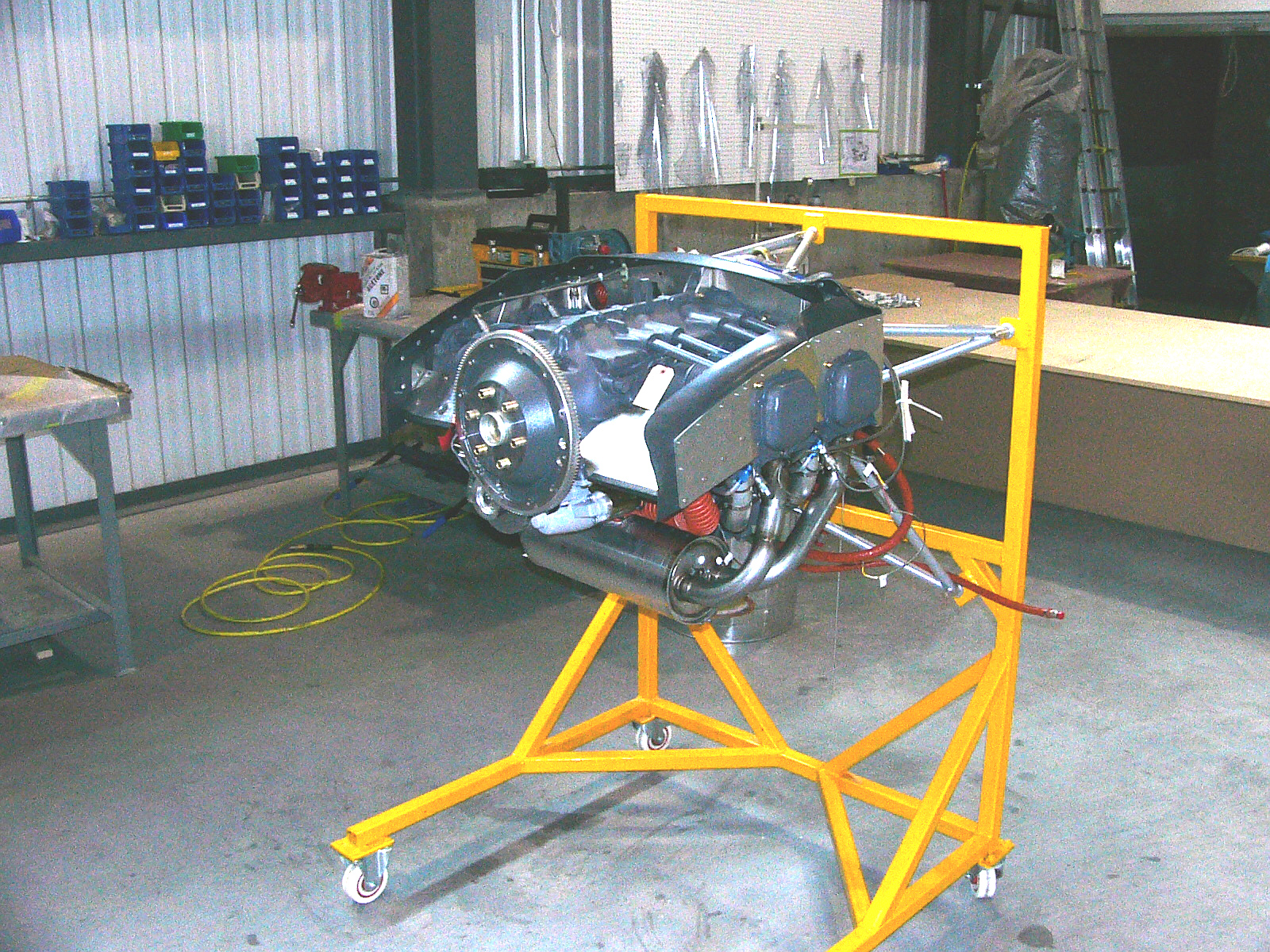
A brand new Lycoming O-320-D2A engine with baffles already mounted

O-320-D2A
160 hp (119 kW) at 2,700 rpm, Minimum fuel grade 100/130 or 91/96 avgas, compression ratio 8.50:1. Same as D1A but with fixed-pitch propeller provisions and 3/8 inch attaching bolts. Used in the Symphony SA-160.
O-320-D2B
160 hp (119 kW) at 2,700 rpm, Minimum fuel grade 100/130 or 91/96 avgas, compression ratio 8.50:1. Same as D2A but retard breaker magnetos.
O-320-D2C
160 hp (119 kW) at 2,700 rpm, Minimum fuel grade 100/130 or 91/96 avgas, compression ratio 8.50:1. Same as D2A except -1200 series magnetos.
O-320-D2F
160 hp (119 kW) at 2,700 rpm, Minimum fuel grade 91/96 avgas, compression ratio 8.50:1. Same as E2F except with high compression pistons.
O-320-D2G
160 hp (119 kW) at 2,700 rpm, Minimum fuel grade 91/96 avgas, compression ratio 8.50:1. Same as the D2A except with Slick instead of Bendix magnetos and 7/16 inch instead of 3/8 inch propeller flange bolts.
O-320-D2H
160 hp (119 kW) at 2,700 rpm, Minimum fuel grade 91/96 avgas, compression ratio 8.50:1. Same as the D2G except with a O-320-B sump and intake pipes and with provisions for AC type fuel pump.
O-320-D2J
160 hp (119 kW) at 2,700 rpm, Minimum fuel grade 91/96 avgas, compression ratio 8.50:1.Similar to the D2G but with two Slick impulse coupling magnetos and the propeller governor pad, fuel pump and governor pads on the accessory housing all not machined. Used in the Cessna 172P.
O-320-D3G
160 hp (119 kW) at 2,700 rpm, Minimum fuel grade 91/96 avgas, compression ratio 8.50:1. Same as the D2G but with 3/8 inch propeller attaching bolts.

O-320-E1A
150 hp (112 kW) at 2,700 rpm, Minimum fuel grade 80/87 avgas, compression ratio 7.00:1. Same as A3B but with Type 1 dynafocal mounts.
O-320-E1B
150 hp (112 kW) at 2,700 rpm, Minimum fuel grade 80/87 avgas, compression ratio 7.00:1. Same as E1A but with retard breaker magnetos.
O-320-E1C
150 hp (112 kW) at 2,700 rpm, Minimum fuel grade 80/87 avgas, compression ratio 7.00:1. Same as E1B.
O-320-E1F
150 hp (112 kW) at 2,700 rpm, Minimum fuel grade 80/87 avgas, compression ratio 7.00:1. Same as E1C but with propeller governor drive on the left front of the crankcase.
O-320-E1J
150 hp (112 kW) at 2,700 rpm, Minimum fuel grade 80/87 avgas, compression ratio 7.00:1. Same as the E1F but with Slick magnetos.
O-320-E2A
150 hp (112 kW) at 2,700 rpm, or 140 hp (104 kW) at 2450 rpm Minimum fuel grade 80/87 avgas, compression ratio 7.00:1. Same as E1A but with fixed-pitch propeller, 3/8 inch attaching bolts and an alternate power rating of 140 hp (104 kW).
O-320-E2B
150 hp (112 kW) at 2,700 rpm, Minimum fuel grade 80/87 avgas, compression ratio 7.00:1. Same as E2A but with retard breaker magnetos.
O-320-E2C
150 hp (112 kW) at 2,700 rpm, or 140 hp (104 kW) at 2450 rpm Minimum fuel grade 80/87 avgas, compression ratio 7.00:1. Same as E2A but -1200 series mags and an alternate power rating of 140 hp (104 kW).
O-320-E2D
150 hp (112 kW) at 2,700 rpm, Minimum fuel grade 80/87 avgas, compression ratio 7.00:1. Similar to E2A but with Slick magnetos and O-235 front. Used in the Cessna 172 I to M models.
O-320-E2F
150 hp (112 kW) at 2,700 rpm, Minimum fuel grade 80/87 avgas, compression ratio 7.00:1. Same as E1F but with fixed pitch prop provisions.
O-320-E2G
150 hp (112 kW) at 2,700 rpm, Minimum fuel grade 80/87 avgas, compression ratio 7.00:1. Same as E2D but with O-320-A sump and intake pipes.
O-320-E2H
150 hp (112 kW) at 2,700 rpm, Minimum fuel grade 80/87 avgas, compression ratio 7.00:1. Same as E2D but with S4LN-20 and -21 magnetos.
O-320-E3D
150 hp (112 kW) at 2,700 rpm, Minimum fuel grade 80/87 avgas, compression ratio 7.00:1. Same as E2D but with 3/8 inch propeller flange bolts.
O-320-E3H
150 hp (112 kW) at 2,700 rpm, Minimum fuel grade 80/87 avgas, compression ratio 7.00:1. Same as E3D but with S4LN-20 and -21 magnetos.

O-320-H1AD
160 hp (119 kW) at 2,700 rpm, Minimum fuel grade 100LL avgas, compression ratio 9.00:1. Integral accessory section crankcase, front-mounted fuel pump external mounted oil pump and D4RN-2O21 impulse coupling dual magneto.
O-320-H1BD
160 hp (119 kW) at 2,700 rpm, Minimum fuel grade 100LL avgas, compression ratio 9.00:1. Same as H1AD but with a D4RN-2200 retard breaker dual magneto.
O-320-H2AD
160 hp (119 kW) at 2,700 rpm, Minimum fuel grade 100LL avgas, compression ratio 9.00:1. Same as H1AD but with provisions for a fixed-pitch propeller.

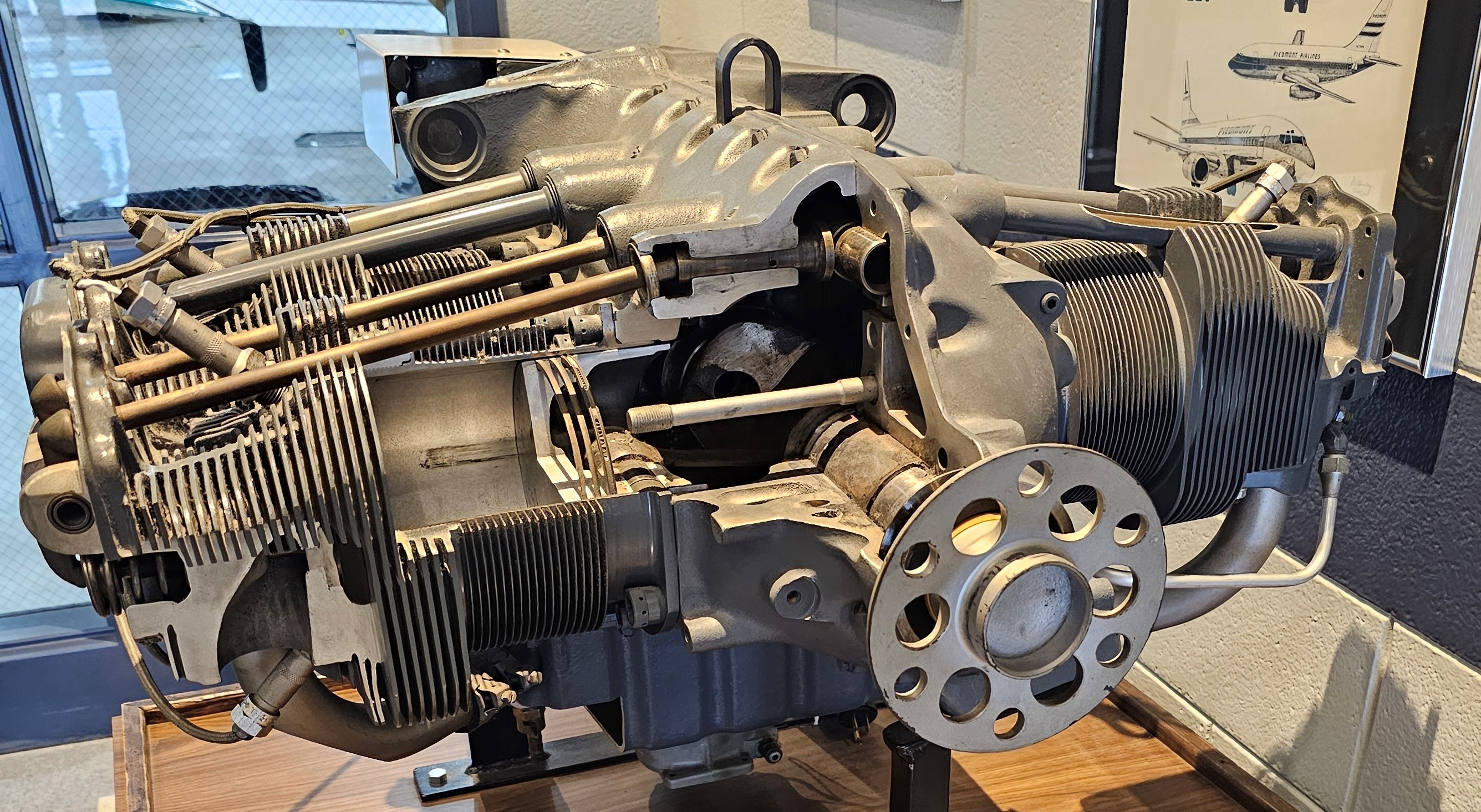
An O-320-H2AD cutaway to show internal parts of the engine.

This was the troublesome engine that was installed on the 1977 to 1980 Cessna 172N Skyhawk. It was notable from all other Lycoming models by incorporating hydraulic lifters that were barrel shaped instead of mushroom type, in an attempt to make the lifters possible to be serviced without having to disassemble the entire engine case, but the higher load on the cam lobes resulted in severe spalling. Multiple service bulletins and airworthiness directives have been issued regarding this specific model, and multiple modifications exist to attempt to mitigate its design defects.
O-320-H2BD
160 hp (119 kW) at 2,700 rpm, Minimum fuel grade 100LL avgas, compression ratio 9.00:1. Same as the H2AD but with a D4RN-2200 retard breaker dual magneto.
O-320-H3AD
160 hp (119 kW) at 2,700 rpm, Minimum fuel grade 100LL avgas, compression ratio 9.00:1. Same as the H2AD but with 3/8 inch propeller flange bolts, instead of 7/16 inch.
O-320-H3BD
160 hp (119 kW) at 2,700 rpm, Minimum fuel grade 100LL avgas, compression ratio 9.00:1. Same as H3AD but with a D4RN-2200 retard breaker dual magneto.

=== IO-320 series ===
IO-320-A1A
150 hp (112 kW) at 2,700 rpm, Minimum fuel grade 80/87 avgas, compression ratio 7.00:1. Base model with a Bendix RSA -5AD1 fuel injection system.
IO-320-A2A
150 hp (112 kW) at 2,700 rpm, Minimum fuel grade 80/87 avgas, compression ratio 7.00:1. Same as A1A but with provisions for fixed-pitch propeller.
IO-320-B1A
160 hp (119 kW) at 2,700 rpm, Minimum fuel grade 91/96 or 100LL avgas, compression ratio 8.50:1. Same as the A1A but with the fuel injector offset toward the engine's fore and aft centerline.
IO-320-B1B
160 hp (119 kW) at 2,700 rpm, Minimum fuel grade 91/96 or 100LL avgas, compression ratio 8.50:1. Same as the A1A but with an AN fuel pump drive.
IO-320-B1C
160 hp (119 kW) at 2,700 rpm, Minimum fuel grade 91/96 or 100LL avgas, compression ratio 8.50:1. Same as the B1A but with an adapter for mounting the fuel injector straight to the rear.
IO-320-B1D
160 hp (119 kW) at 2,700 rpm, Minimum fuel grade 91/96 or 100LL avgas, compression ratio 8.50:1. Same as the B1C but with S-1200 series high altitude magnetos.
IO-320-B1E
160 hp (119 kW) at 2,700 rpm, Minimum fuel grade 91/96 or 100LL avgas, compression ratio 8.50:1. Same as the D1C except with a horizontal fuel injector.
IO-320-B2A
160 hp (119 kW) at 2,700 rpm, Minimum fuel grade 91/96 or 100LL avgas, compression ratio 8.50:1. Same as the BIA but with provision for a fixed-pitch propeller.
IO-320-C1A
160 hp (119 kW) at 2,700 rpm, Minimum fuel grade 91/96 or 100LL avgas, compression ratio 8.50:1. Same as the B1B except it has features making it suitable for adding a turbo-supercharger via a Supplemental Type Certificate This engine has internal piston cooling oil nozzles.
IO-320-C1B
160 hp (119 kW) at 2,700 rpm, Minimum fuel grade 91/96 or 100LL avgas, compression ratio 8.50:1. Same as the C1A but with a horizontal rear-mounted fuel injector.
IO-320-D1A
160 hp (119 kW) at 2,700 rpm, Minimum fuel grade 91/96 or 100LL avgas, compression ratio 8.50:1. Same as the B1D but with Type 1 dynafocal mounts, S4LN-1227 and S4LN-1209 magnetos and the fuel injector mounted vertically under the oil sump.
IO-320-D1B
160 hp (119 kW) at 2,700 rpm, Minimum fuel grade 91/96 or 100LL avgas, compression ratio 8.50:1. Same as the D1A but with the propeller governor drive on the left front of crankcase instead of on the accessory housing.
IO-320-D1C
160 hp (119 kW) at 2,700 rpm, Minimum fuel grade 91/96 or 100LL avgas, compression ratio 8.50:1. Same as the D1B but with Slick Magnetos.
IO-320-E1A
150 hp (112 kW) at 2,700 rpm, Minimum fuel grade 80/87 avgas, compression ratio 7.00:1. Same as E2A but with provision for a controllable-pitch propeller.
IO-320-E1B
150 hp (112 kW) at 2,700 rpm, Minimum fuel grade 80/87 avgas, compression ratio 7.00:1. Same as E1A but with Slick 4050 and 4051 magnetos.
IO-320-E2A
150 hp (112 kW) at 2,700 rpm, Minimum fuel grade 80/87 avgas, compression ratio 7.00:1. Same as A2A but with Scintilla S4LN-20 and S4LN-21 magnetos, straight conical mounts, and the fuel injector mounted under the oil sump.
IO-320-E2B
150 hp (112 kW) at 2,700 rpm, Minimum fuel grade 80/87 avgas, compression ratio 7.00:1. Same as E2A but with Slick 4050 and 4051 magnetos.
IO-320-F1A
160 hp (119 kW) at 2,700 rpm, Minimum fuel grade 91/96 or 100LL avgas, compression ratio 8.50:1. Same as the C1A except with a Type 1 (30°) dynafocal mount attachment instead of Type 2 (18°) mount attachment.

=== LIO-320 series ===
LIO-320-B1A
160 hp (119 kW) at 2,700 rpm, Minimum fuel grade 91/96 or 100LL avgas, compression ratio 8.50:1. Same as B1A except with counter-clockwise engine rotation and reverse rotation of accessories. It uses a modified starter ring gear, crankshaft, cam shaft, accessory housing and oil pump body. This engine is usually paired with an IO-320-B1A on a twin-engined aircraft.
LIO-320-C1A
160 hp (119 kW) at 2,700 rpm, Minimum fuel grade 91/96 or 100LL avgas, compression ratio 8.50:1. Same as C1A except with the same changes as the LIO-320-B1A. It has provisions for adding a turbo-supercharger. This engine is usually paired with an IO-320-C1A on a twin-engined aircraft.

=== AIO-320 series ===
AIO-320-A1A
160 hp (119 kW) at 2,700 rpm, Minimum fuel grade 91/96 or 100LL avgas, compression ratio 8.50:1. Same as the IO-320-B1D but this model permits installation and operation of the engine in the inverted position. The differences include a front-mounted propeller governor, two dry oil sumps, dual external oil scavenge pumps, an oil tank, three options for the position of the fuel injector and a Type 1 dynafocal mount.
AIO-320-A1B
160 hp (119 kW) at 2,700 rpm, Minimum fuel grade 91/96 or 100LL avgas, compression ratio 8.50:1. Same as the A1A but with one impulse coupling magneto.
AIO-320-A2A
160 hp (119 kW) at 2,700 rpm, Minimum fuel grade 91/96 or 100LL avgas, compression ratio 8.50:1. Same as the A1A but with provision for a fixed-pitch propeller.
AIO-320-A2B
160 hp (119 kW) at 2,700 rpm, Minimum fuel grade 91/96 or 100LL avgas, compression ratio 8.50:1. Same as the A1A but has one impulse coupling magneto and a fixed-pitch propeller.
AIO-320-B1B
160 hp (119 kW) at 2,700 rpm, Minimum fuel grade 91/96 or 100LL avgas, compression ratio 8.50:1. Same as the A1B but with a front-mounted fuel injector.
AIO-320-C1B
160 hp (119 kW) at 2,700 rpm, Minimum fuel grade 91/96 or 100LL avgas, compression ratio 8.50:1. Same as the B1B but with the fuel injector vertically mounted on bottom of the oil sump in the front position.

=== AEIO-320 series ===
AEIO-320-D1B
160 hp (119 kW) at 2,700 rpm, Minimum fuel grade 91/96 or 100LL avgas, compression ratio 8.50:1. Same as the IO-320-D1B but with an inverted oil system kit to allow aerobatic flight.
AEIO-320-D2B
160 hp (119 kW) at 2,700 rpm, Minimum fuel grade 91/96 or 100LL avgas, compression ratio 8.50:1. Same as the AEIO-320-D1A but without provisions for a propeller governor.
AEIO-320-E1A
150 hp (112 kW) at 2,700 rpm, Minimum fuel grade 80/87 avgas, compression ratio 7.00:1. Same as the IO-320-E1A but with an inverted oil system kit to allow aerobatic flight.
AEIO-320-E1B
150 hp (112 kW) at 2,700 rpm, Minimum fuel grade 80/87 avgas, compression ratio 7.00:1. Same as the IO-320-E1B but with an inverted oil system kit to allow aerobatic flight.
AEIO-320-E2A
150 hp (112 kW) at 2,700 rpm, Minimum fuel grade 80/87 avgas, compression ratio 7.00:1. Same as the IO-320-E2A but with an inverted oil system kit to allow aerobatic flight.
AEIO-320-E2B
150 hp (112 kW) at 2,700 rpm, Minimum fuel grade 80/87 avgas, compression ratio 7.00:1. Same as the IO-320-E2B but with an inverted oil system kit to allow aerobatic flight.

== Applications ==
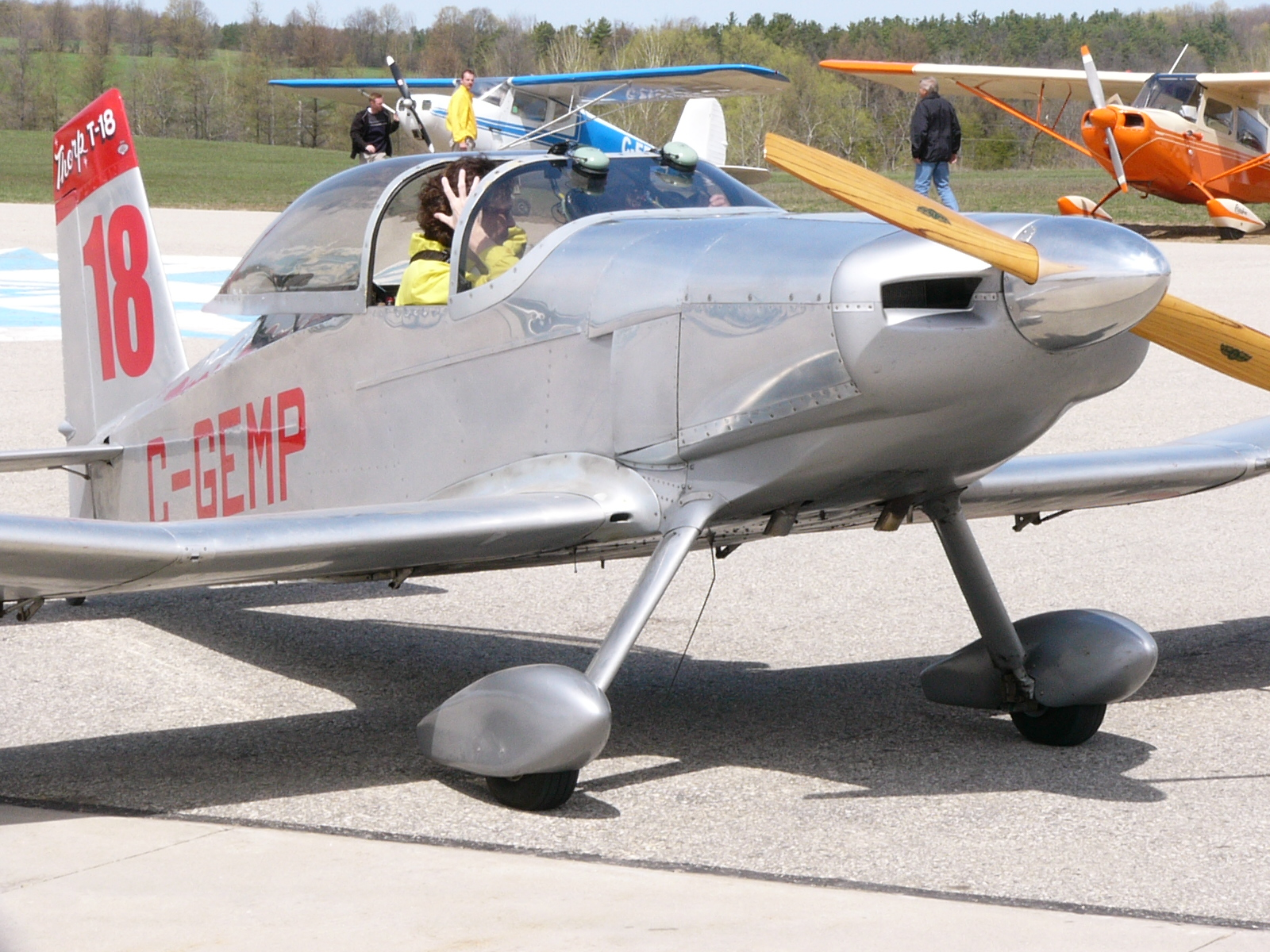
The Lycoming O-320 is a common engine used by amateur-builders in the Thorp T-18.

- Aero Eli Serviza Yo-Yo 222
- Aviat Husky A-1B-160
- Avid Flyer
- Aero Commander 100
- Alpha 160A
- American Champion Citabria
- Australian Aircraft Kits Hornet STOL
- Australian Lightwing SP-4000 Speed
- Aviation Industries of Iran AVA-202
- Beagle Pup Series 2 and 3
- Bearhawk Companion
- Beechcraft Musketeer
- Bede BD-12
- Bellanca Decathlon
- Bushcaddy L-160
- Canadian Home Rotors Safari
- Cessna 172
- Cessna 177
- Custom Flight North Star
- Christavia Mk IV
- Dakota Cub Super 18
- DRDO Rustom
- EM-11 Orka
- Eaves Cougar 1
- Explorer Ellipse
- Falconar F12A Cruiser
- Farrington Twinstar
- Fly-Fan Shark
- Fuji FA-200 Aero Subaru
- Glasair GlaStar
- Grumman American AA-5
- Gulfstream American GA-7 Cougar
- Hatz CB-1
- Hatz Classic
- IRI T22B
- Lambert Mission 212
- MBB Bo 209
- Mooney M20
- Murphy Elite
- Mustang Aeronautics Mustang II
- Osprey Osprey 2
- Partenavia P66B Oscar 150
- Peña Dahu
- PIK-15
- PIK-19
- Piper PA-20 Pacer
- Piper PA-18 Super Cub
- Piper PA-23 Aztec
- Piper PA-23 Apache
- Piper PA-28 Cherokee
- Piper PA-30 Twin Comanche
- Piper PA-40 Arapaho
- Preceptor STOL King
- PZL-110 Koliber
- Quikkit Glass Goose
- Rihn DR-107 One Design
- Robin DR400
- Robinson R22
- Rutan Long-EZ
- Sands Fokker Dr.1 Triplane
- SGP M-222 Flamingo
- SME Aero Tiga
- Socata TB9 Tampico
- Softex-Aero V-24
- Symphony SA-160
- Tapanee Levitation 2
- Thorp T-18
- Van's Aircraft RV-3
- Van's Aircraft RV-4
- Van's Aircraft RV-6
- Van's Aircraft RV-8
- Van's Aircraft RV-9
- Varga Kachina
- Velocity V-Twin
- Vortech Shadow
- Vulcanair P-68C
- Warne Bubble Plane
- Wassmer WA 52
- Whisper X350 Generation II
- Wickham B
- Wittman Tailwind

== Specifications (O-320-A1A) ==
Data from TYPE CERTIFICATE DATA SHEET NO. E-274 Revision 20

=== General characteristics ===
- Type: Four-cylinder air-cooled horizontally opposed engine
- Bore: 5.125 in (130.18 mm)
- Stroke: 3.875 in (98.43 mm)
- Displacement: 319.8 cu in (5.24 L)
- Dry weight: 244 lb (111 kg)

=== Components ===
- Valvetrain: Two overhead valves per cylinder
- Fuel system: Updraft carburetor
- Fuel type: minimum grade of 80/87 avgas
- Oil system: Wet sump
- Cooling system: Air-cooled

=== Performance ===
- Power output: 150 hp (112 kW)
- Compression ratio: 7:1
- Power-to-weight ratio: 0.61 hp/lb (0.99 kW/kg)

== See also ==
- List of aircraft engines
