= Wickham B =

Model B
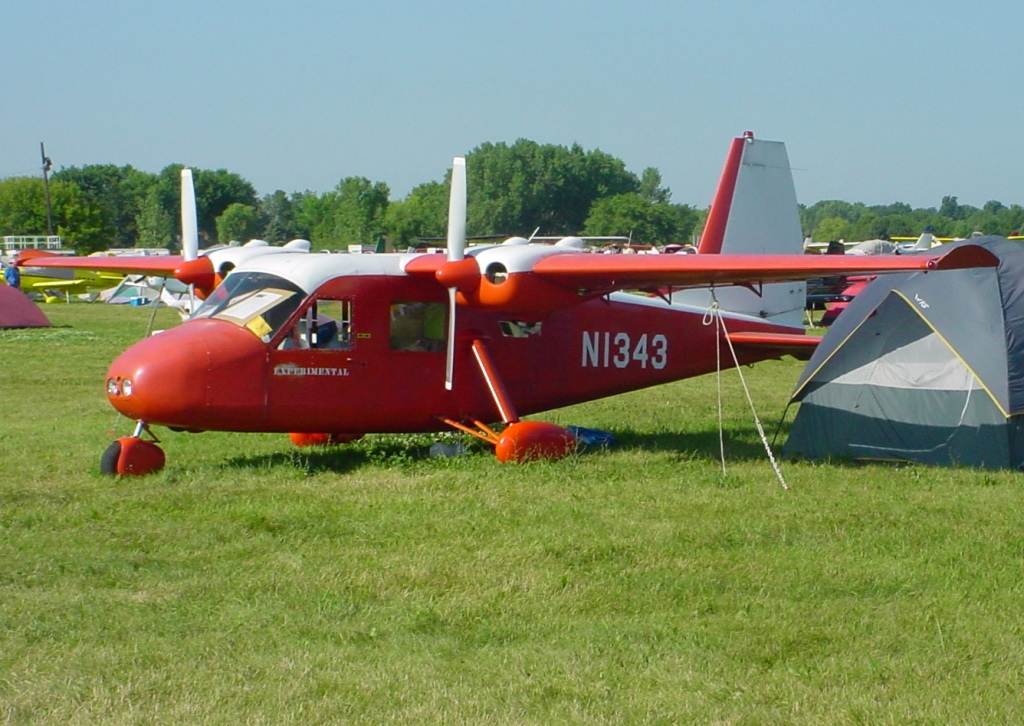

General information
- Type: Homebuilt aircraft
- National origin: United States
- Designer: Jim Wickham

The Wickham B is an American experimental twin engined, homebuilt aircraft.

== Design and development ==
The twin engine aircraft was designed by Boeing engineer Jim Wickham in order to fly safely on one engine over the Seattle area.

The model B is a high-wing, fixed tricycle landing gear, twin engine aircraft. The aircraft uses all aluminum construction with fiberglass cowlings, nose cone and wheel pants. The wings are configured with Fowler flaps. The wing has no dihedral. The two 25 U.S. gallons (95 L; 21 imp gal) fuel tanks are located in the leading edges of the outboard panels just outboard of the engines. The fuel tanks are independent of each other with no cross feed capability or fuel lines in the cabin. The aircraft uses a throw-over yoke control, similar to a Beechcraft Bonanza. Design of the aircraft was started in December, 1957 and first flew in April, 1968. Initially the engines were 125 hp Lycoming O-290's but were subsequently changed to 150 hp Lycoming O-320 engines.

== Operational history ==
The Wickham B was donated to the Seattle Museum of Flight, then traded to the South Seattle Community College. In 2002, the aircraft was sold and restored to flying condition by Ross Mahon in Everett, Washington. In 2012 the plane was sold to Curtis Clark and it is based at Deer Valley Airport in Phoenix, Arizona.

== Specifications (Model B) ==
Data from Sport Aviation, original drawings, and Wickham B POH (Pilot Operating Handbook) Rev 3/18/06.

General characteristics

- Capacity: 5
- Length: 25 ft 10 in (7.87 m)
- Wingspan: 40 ft 3 in (12.27 m)
- Height: 9 ft 10 in (3.00 m)
- Wing area: 163 sq ft (15.1 m^{2})
- Aspect ratio: 9.5
- Airfoil: NACA 63A- 418, taper to 4412
- Empty weight: 2,065 lb (937 kg)
- Gross weight: 3,200 lb (1,451 kg)
- Fuel capacity: 50 U.S. gallons (190 L; 42 imp gal) in two 25 U.S. gallons (95 L; 21 imp gal) tanks
- Powerplant: 2 × Lycoming O-320 four cylinder, horizontally opposed piston aircraft engines
- Propellers: 2-bladed McCauley 1A170 70x64

Performance

- Maximum speed: 120 kn (140 mph, 230 km/h)
- Cruise speed: 100 kn (120 mph, 190 km/h)
- Stall speed: 47 kn (54 mph, 87 km/h)
- Never exceed speed: 160 kn (180 mph, 290 km/h)
- Minimum control speed: 56 kn (65 mph, 105 km/h)
- Endurance: 4 hours
- Service ceiling: 18,000 ft (5,500 m)
- Rate of climb: 1,500 ft/min (7.6 m/s)
- Wing loading: 19.6 lb/sq ft (96 kg/m^{2})

== See also ==
Related development

- Wickham A Bluebird
- Wickham Model C Sunbird
