= Softex-Aero V-24 =

V-24
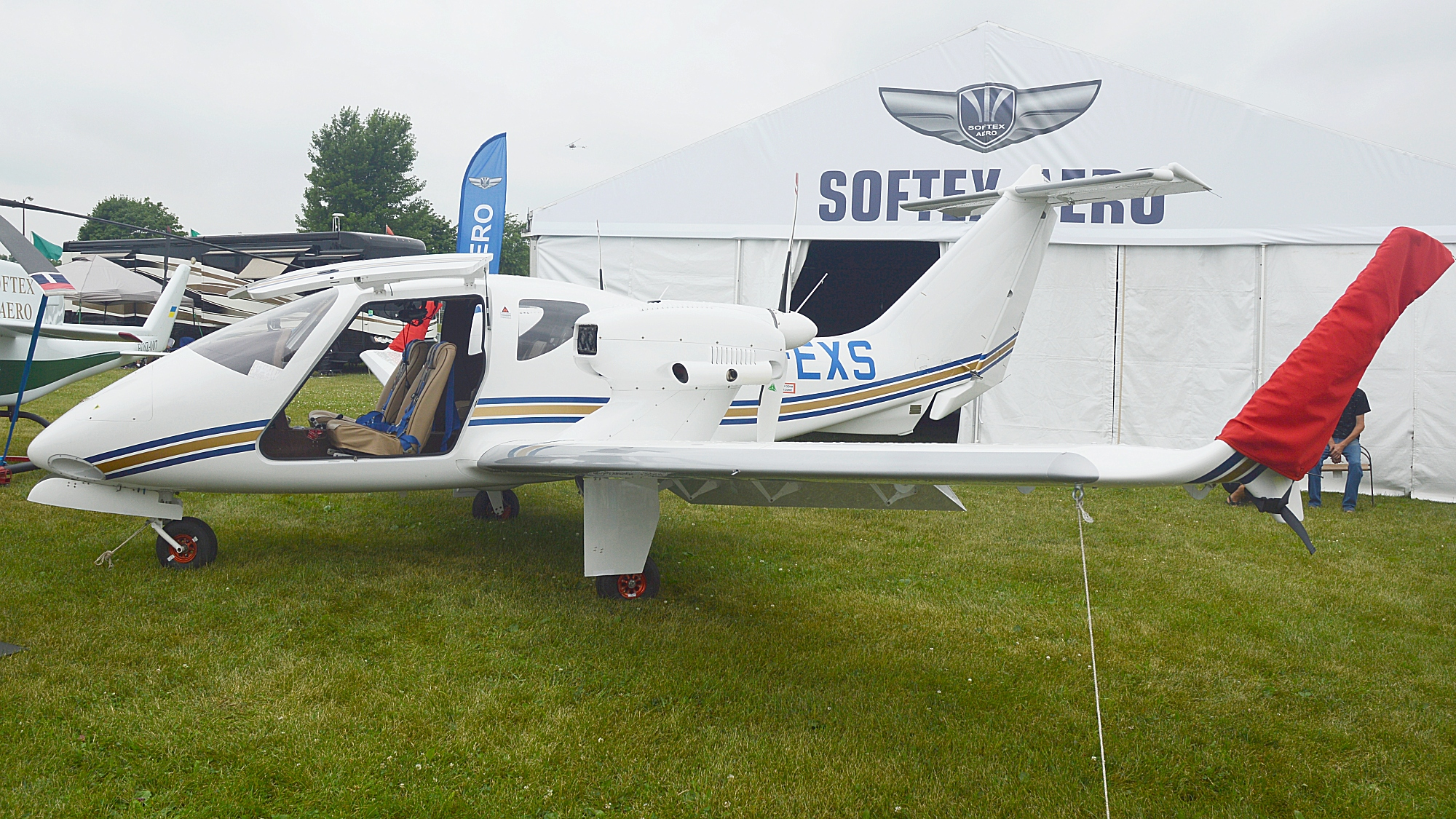

General information
- Type: Light aircraft
- National origin: Ukraine
- Manufacturer: Softex-Aero
- Status: In development

History
- Introduction date: 2014
- First flight: 2012

The Softex-Aero V-24 is a five place twin engined aircraft from Ukrainian-based Softex-Aero.

== Design and development ==
The V-24 is a T-tailed twin engine composite construction pusher aircraft with retractable tricycle landing gear. The aircraft will be powered by either Rotax 912, or 160 hp Lycoming IO-320 engines. The aircraft has a Galaxy GRS 1200 parachute system integrated into the airframe. Turboprop engines are also under consideration.

== Variants ==
V-24
Rotax 912 power
V-24L
160hp Lycoming IO-320
V-24TP
PBS TJ-100 turboprop power

== Specifications (V-24) ==
Data from AOPA

General characteristics

- Crew: 1 pilot
- Capacity: 4 passengers
- Wingspan: 11.2 m (36.7 ft)
- Gross weight: 1,300 kg (2,866 lb)
- Powerplant: 2 × Rotax 912 horizontally opposed piston aircraft engine, 75 kW (100 hp) each
- Propellers: 3-bladed MT Propeller

Performance

- Maximum speed: 250 km/h (155 mph, 135 kn)
- Cruise speed: 219 km/h (136 mph, 118 kn)
- Stall speed: 98 km/h (61 mph, 53 kn)
- g limits: +4/-2

Avionics

- Dynon SkyView
