= Wickham A Bluebird =

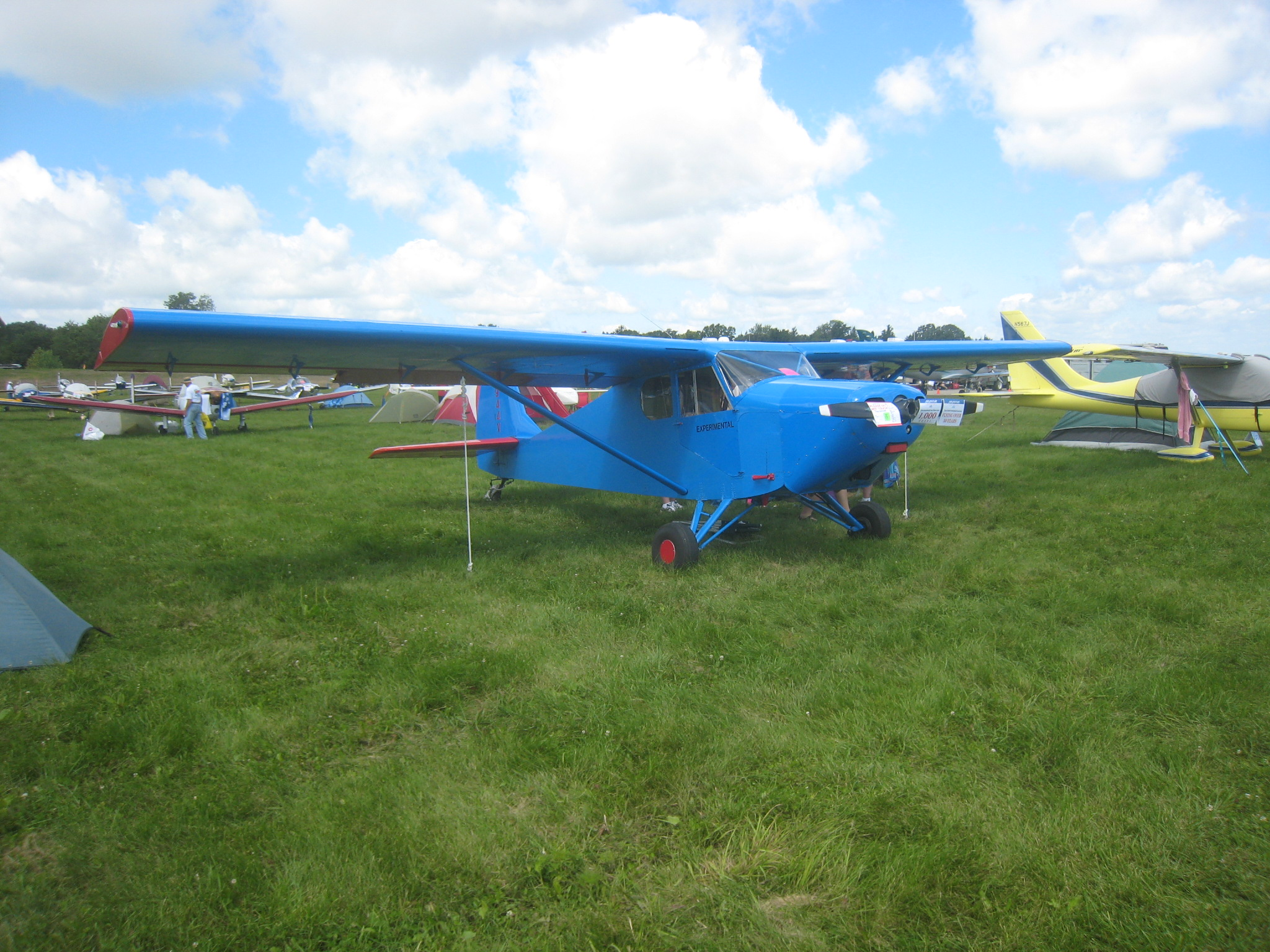
- A Wickham Bluebird on display

General information
- Type: Homebuilt aircraft
- National origin: United States
- Designer: Jim Wickham
- Number built: 1

History
- First flight: 1 June 1955

The Wickham A Bluebird is an all-metal four passenger homebuilt aircraft designed by Boeing engineer Jim Wickham.

== Design ==
The Bluebird is an all-metal four place strut-braced high-wing aircraft with conventional landing gear. The wings feature full-span flaperons.

== Operational history ==
The prototype Wickham A was the first of six designs by Wickham, and first flight was after seven years of construction starting in 1948. The first flight was from Boeing field in Seattle, Washington.

== Specifications (Wickham A Bluebird) ==
Data from General Aviation News

General characteristics

- Crew: 2
- Capacity: 4-5
- Wingspan: 33 ft (10 m)
- Gross weight: 2,000 lb (907 kg)
- Propellers: 2-bladed

Performance

- Cruise speed: 100 kn (120 mph, 190 km/h)

== See also ==
Related development

- Wickham B
- Wickham Model C Sunbird
