= Elmwood Aviation =

Canadian aircraft manufacturer

- Company type: Privately held company
- Industry: Aerospace
- Founded: 1980s
- Founder: Ron Mason
- Headquarters: Frankford, Ontario, Canada
- Products: Aircraft plans

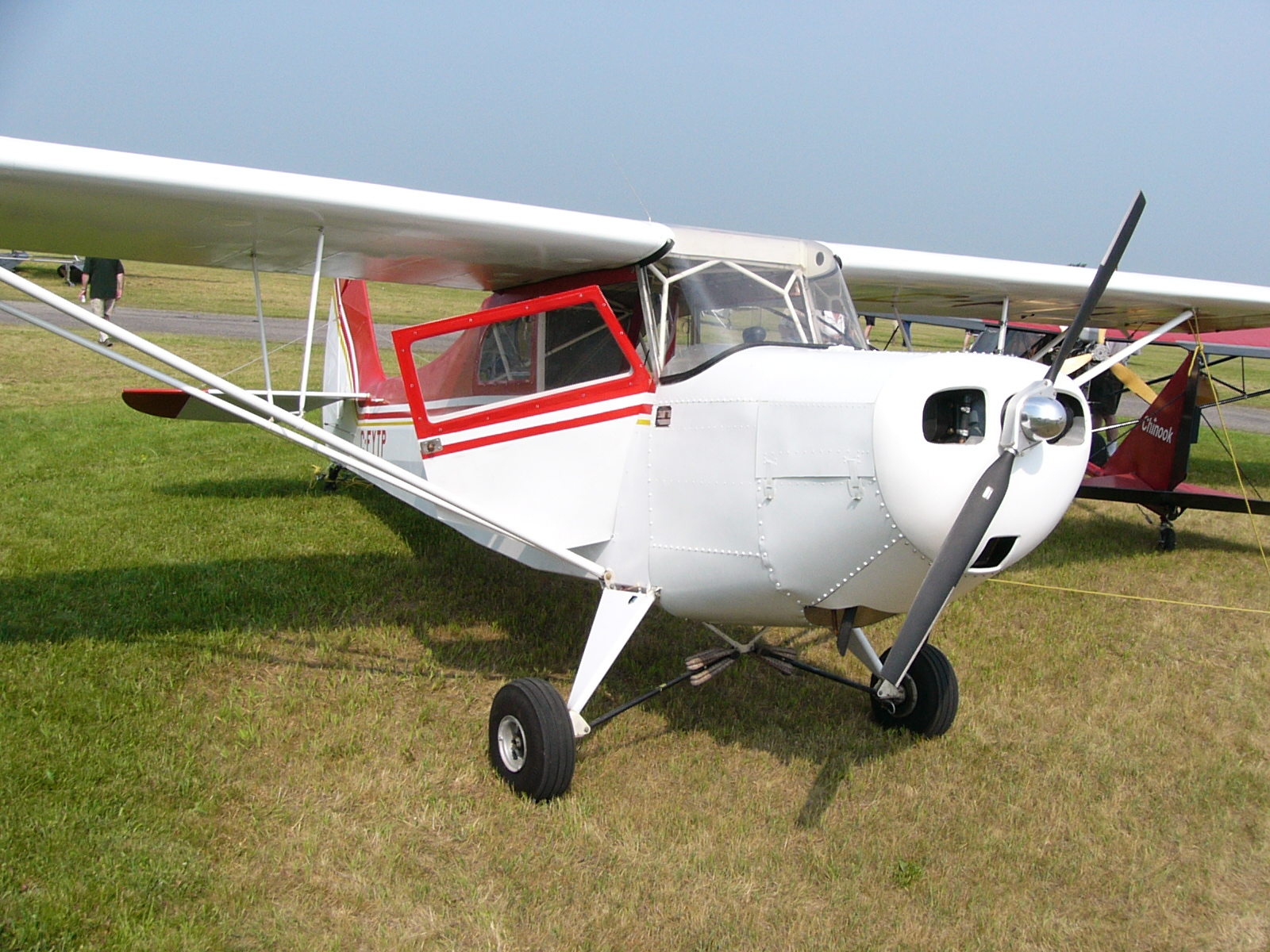
Christavia Mk I

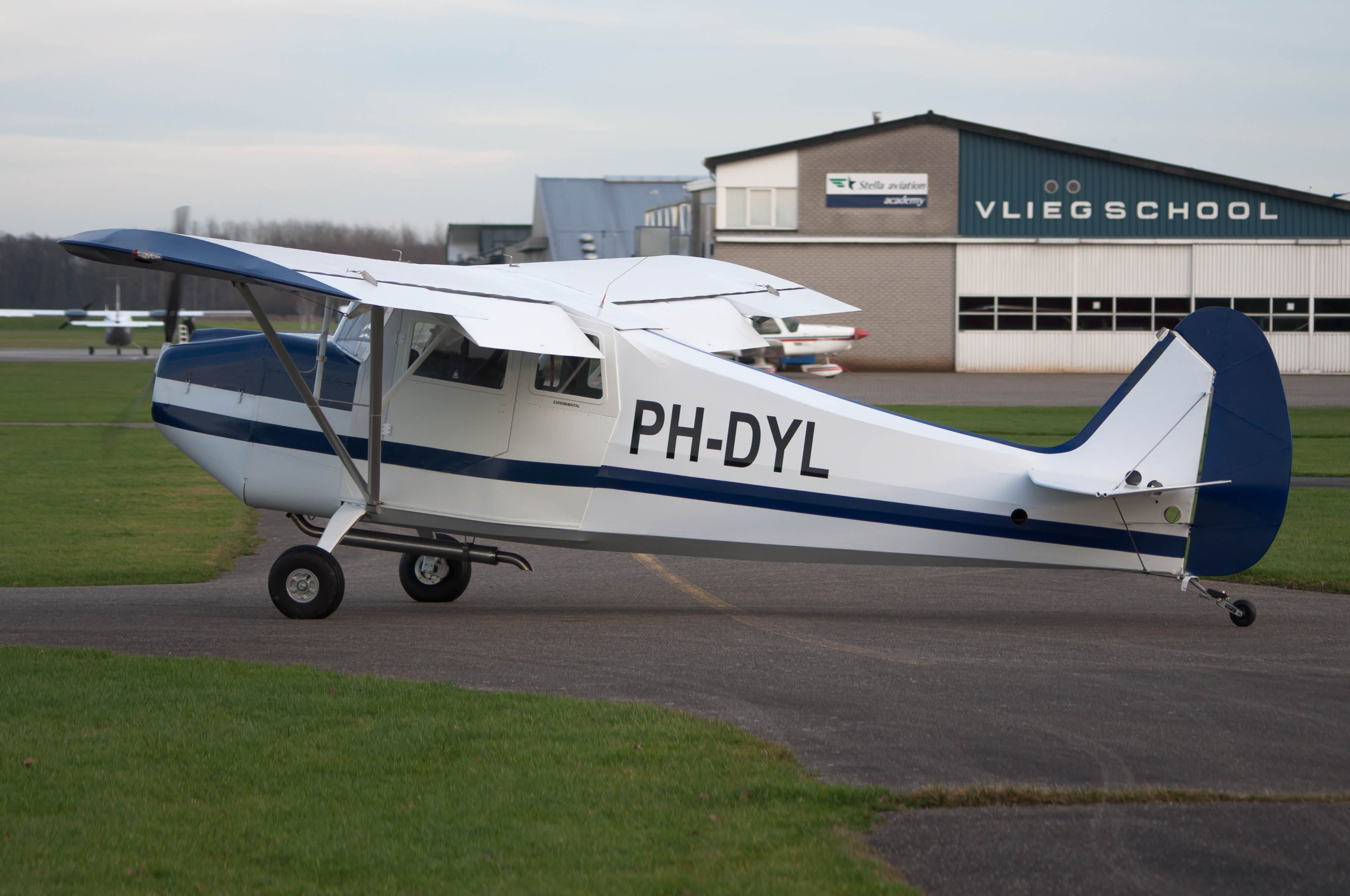
Christavia Mk IV

Elmwood Aviation is a Canadian aircraft manufacturer, founded by aircraft designer Ron Mason and based in Frankford, Ontario (formerly in Belleville, Ontario). The company specializes in the design of light aircraft for amateur construction, especially for missionary aviation use. The Christavia aircraft series name means "Christ-in-Aviation".

Plans are marketed by Aircraft Spruce & Specialty Co as well as directly by Elmwood Aviation.

All of Mason's designs use his own custom airfoil profile. The Christavia Mk I first flew in 1983 and over 350 had been completed and flown by 2002.

== Aircraft ==
Summary of aircraft built by Elmwood Aviation
Model name	First flight	Number built	Type
Christavia Mk I	1983	350 (2002)	Two seat tandem amateur-built aircraft
Christavia Mk II			Two seat side-by-side configuration amateur-built aircraft
Christavia Mk IV		250 (1998)	Four seat amateur-built aircraft
