= Christavia =

Christavia may refer to either one of two aircraft designs by Ron Mason, Elmwood Aviation, Belleville, Ontario, Canada:

- Christavia Mk I
- Christavia Mk IV
