= Mirage Aircraft Corporation =

American aircraft manufacturer

- Company type: Privately held company
- Industry: Aerospace
- Headquarters: Prescott Valley, Arizona, United States
- Products: Homebuilt aircraft plans
- Website: mirage-aircraft.net

Mirage Aircraft Corporation is an American aircraft manufacturer based in Prescott Valley, Arizona. The company specializes in the provision of homebuilt aircraft plans for amateur construction.

The company markets plans for the Mirage Celerity that was designed by Larry Burton and first flown in 1985. Burton died suddenly of a heart attack in 1994 and Mirage Aircraft continued the sale of his aircraft design. Kits for the Celerity and the fixed gear Mirage Marathon variant are provided by Aircraft Spruce & Specialty Co.

The company was originally located in Tucson, Arizona and later relocated to Prescott Valley, Arizona.

== Aircraft ==
Aircraft built by Mirage Aircraft Corporation
Model name	First flight	Number built	Type
Mirage Celerity	1985	4	Two seat, retractable conventional landing gear, homebuilt aircraft
Mirage Marathon		1	Two seat, fixed tricycle landing gear, homebuilt aircraft
