= Hatz Classic =

American homebuilt biplane

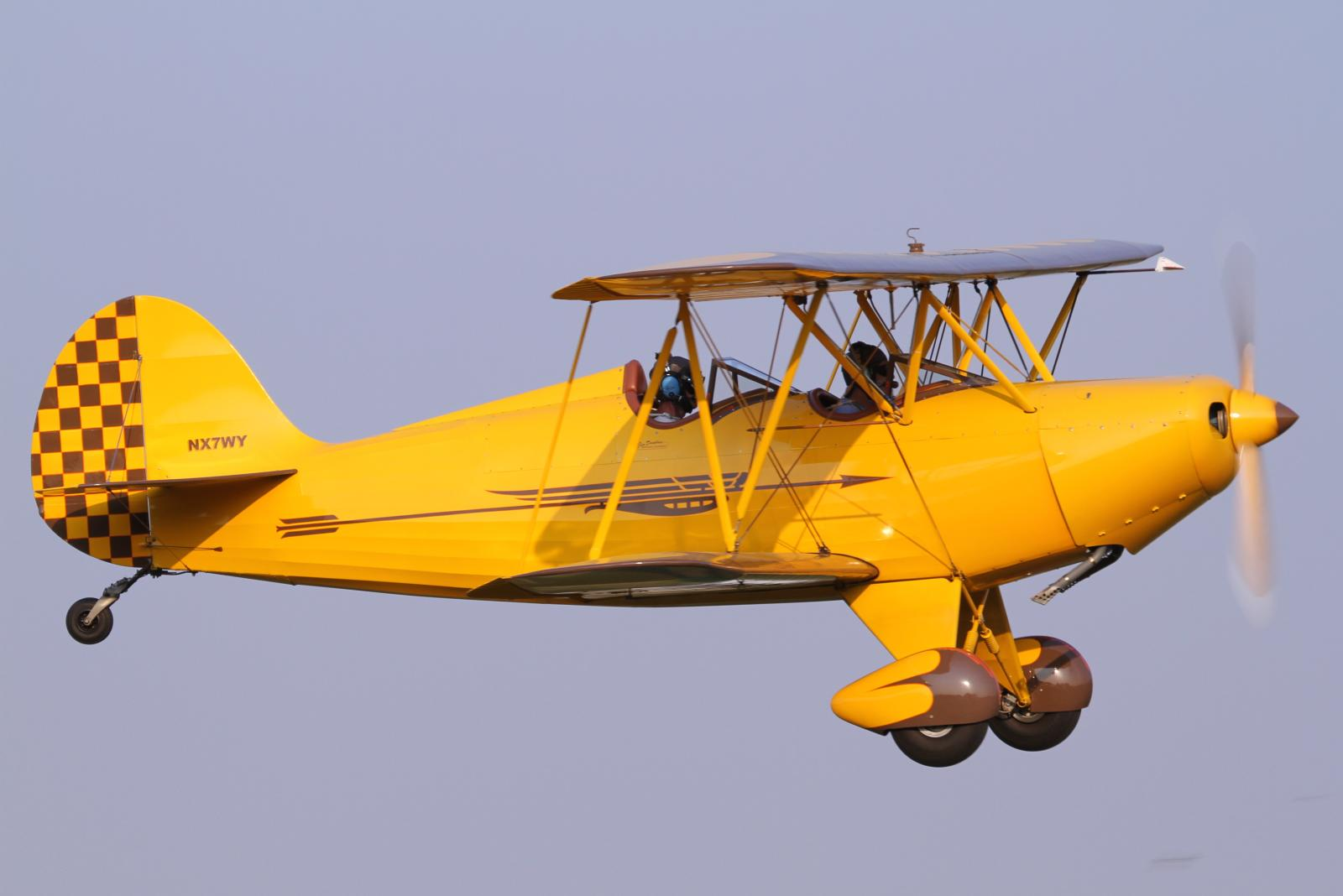

General information
- Type: Homebuilt aircraft
- National origin: United States
- Manufacturer: Makelan Corporation
- Designer: Billy Dawson
- Status: In production (1999)
- Number built: at least 12

History
- Developed from: Hatz CB-1

The Hatz Classic is an American homebuilt biplane, designed by Billy Dawson and produced by the Makelan Corporation of New Braunfels, Texas. The aircraft is supplied as a kit or, alternatively, in the form of plans for amateur construction.

== Design and development ==
The Hatz Classic is a development of the Hatz CB-1. The major differences from the CB-1 are that the fuselage is more rounded, it mounts a larger engine, it uses push-pull tubes instead of control cables for the ailerons and elevators and it has aluminum ailerons. As well the seats are relocated in the fuselage and reclined to provide more leg room and comfort for the occupants.

The resulting aircraft features a strut-braced biplane layout, two-seats-in-tandem accommodation in separate open cockpits with individual windshields, fixed conventional landing gear with wheel pants and a single engine in tractor configuration.

The aircraft fuselage is made from welded 4130 steel tubing, while the wings are of wooden construction all covered in doped aircraft fabric. Its 25.00 ft (7.6 m) span wing employs a Clark Y airfoil and has a total wing area of 180 sq ft (17 m^{2}). The cabin width is 26 in (66 cm). The acceptable power range is 150 to 160 hp (112 to 119 kW) and the standard engine used is the 150 hp (112 kW) Lycoming O-320 powerplant.

The Hatz Classic has a typical empty weight of 1,050 lb (480 kg) and a gross weight of 1,700 lb (770 kg), giving a useful load of 650 lb (290 kg). With full fuel of 26 U.S. gallons (98 L; 22 imp gal) the payload for the pilot, passenger and baggage is 494 lb (224 kg).

The Hatz Classic is capable of basic aerobatics, including loops, rolls and hammerheads. The manufacturer estimates the construction time from the supplied kit as 1000 hours.

== Operational history ==
The design won several awards, including Reserve Grand Champion - Plans Built at Airventure 1996, Grand Champion Experimental and Reserve Grand Champion Open Cockpit - Biplane at the 1997 Biplane Expo and Grand Champion - Plans Built at AirVenture 1997.

By 1998 the company reported that five kits had been sold and three aircraft were completed and flying.

In September 2014 twelve examples were registered in the United States with the Federal Aviation Administration.

== Specifications (Hatz Classic) ==
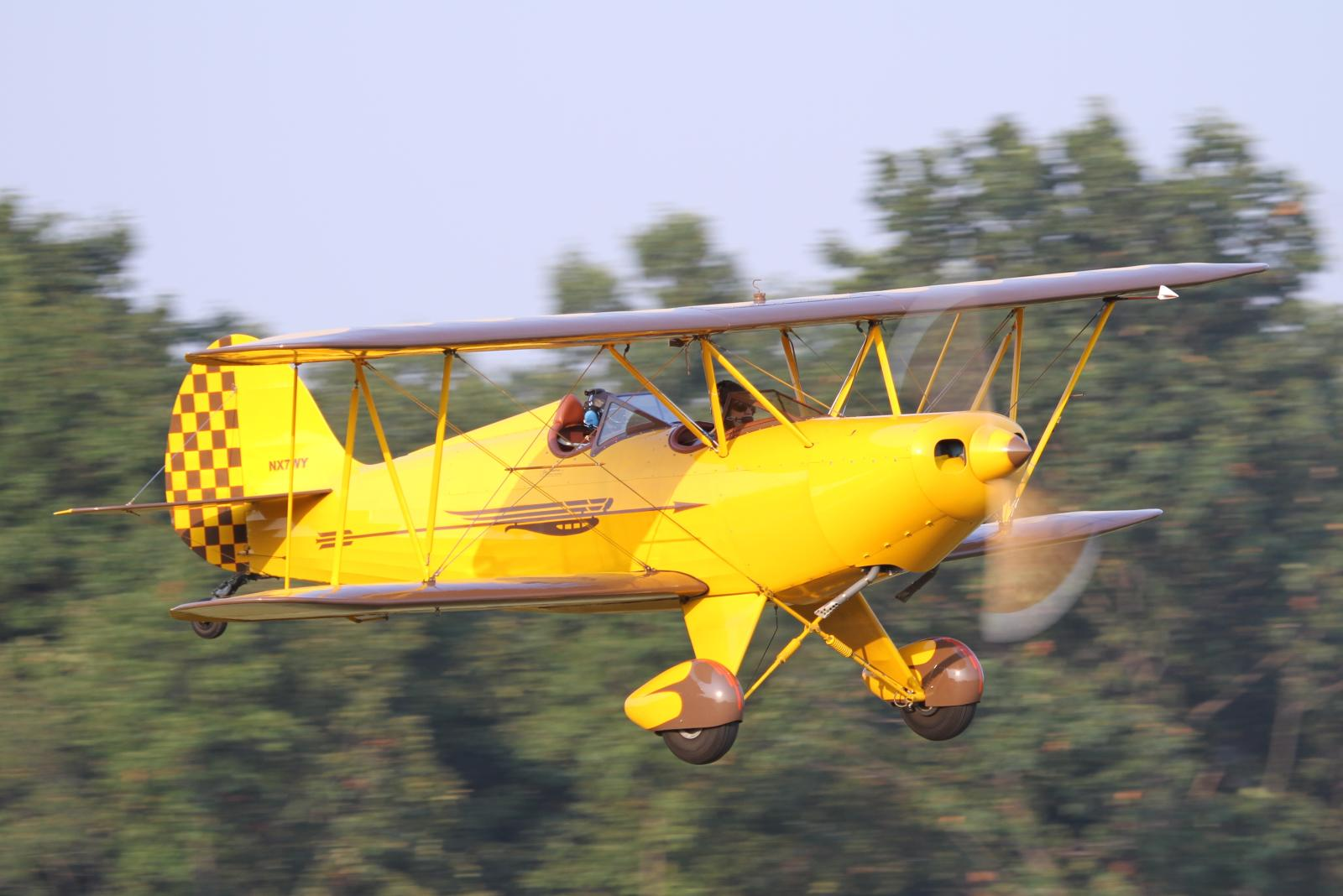
Hatz Classic

Data from AeroCrafter and Makelan Corporation

General characteristics

- Crew: one
- Capacity: one passenger
- Length: 19.2 ft (5.9 m)
- Wingspan: 25.0 ft (7.6 m)
- Height: 7.8 ft (2.4 m)
- Wing area: 180 sq ft (17 m^{2})
- Airfoil: Clark Y
- Empty weight: 1,050 lb (476 kg)
- Gross weight: 1,700 lb (771 kg)
- Fuel capacity: 26 U.S. gallons (98 L; 22 imp gal)
- Powerplant: 1 × Lycoming O-320 four cylinder, air-cooled, four stroke aircraft engine, 150 hp (110 kW)
- Propellers: 2-bladed fixed pitch

Performance

- Maximum speed: 150 mph (240 km/h, 130 kn)
- Cruise speed: 115 mph (185 km/h, 100 kn)
- Stall speed: 42 mph (68 km/h, 36 kn)
- Service ceiling: 10,000 ft (3,000 m)
- g limits: +6/-4
- Rate of climb: 1,000 ft/min (5.1 m/s)
- Wing loading: 9.4 lb/sq ft (46 kg/m^{2})

== See also ==
- List of aerobatic aircraft
