= Hatz CB-1 =

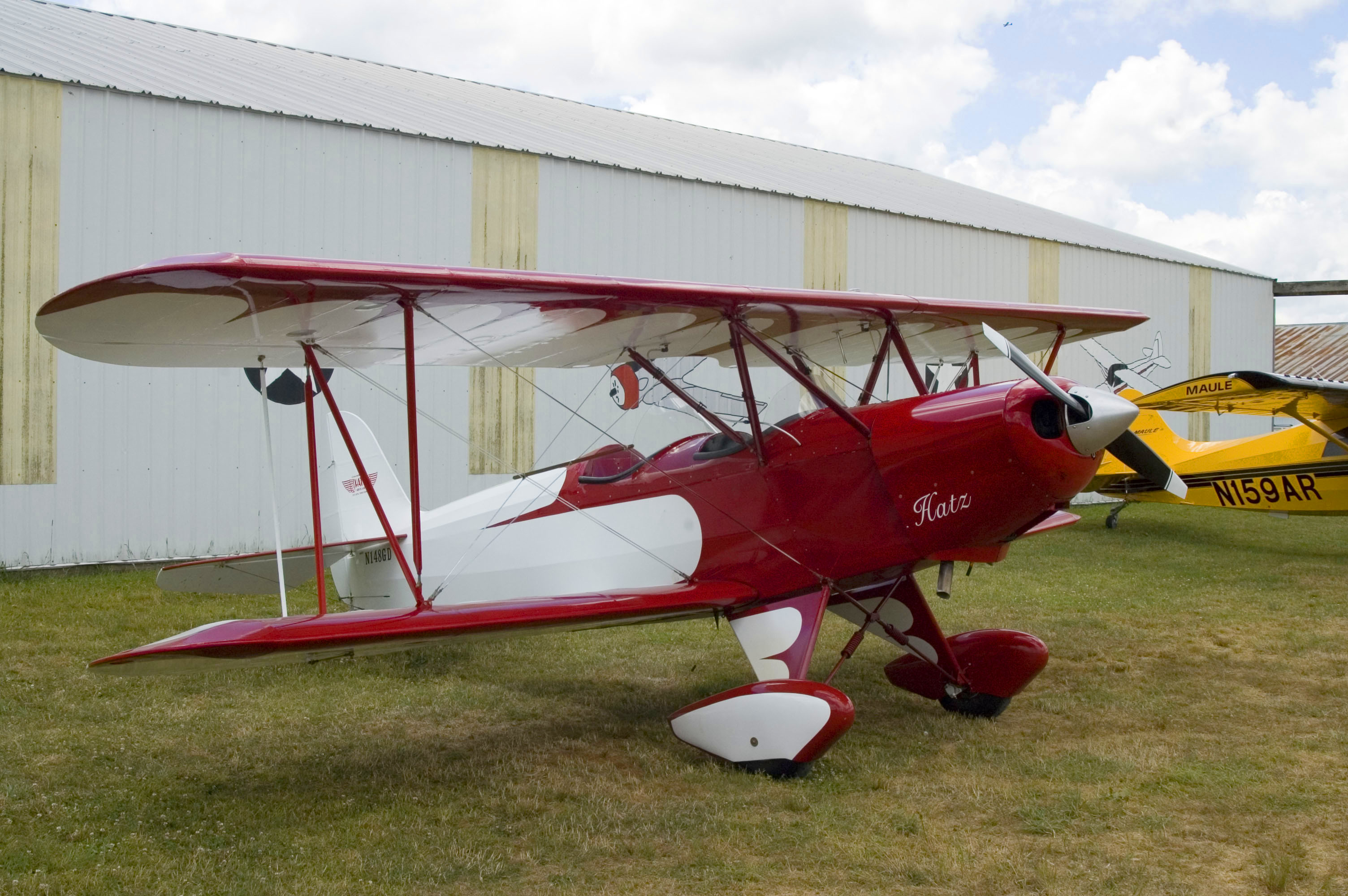

General information
- Type: Homebuilt biplane
- Manufacturer: Makelan Corp
- Designer: John Hatz
- Number built: 150 (2011)

History
- Introduction date: 1969
- First flight: 1968
- Variants: Hatz Classic; Kelly-D

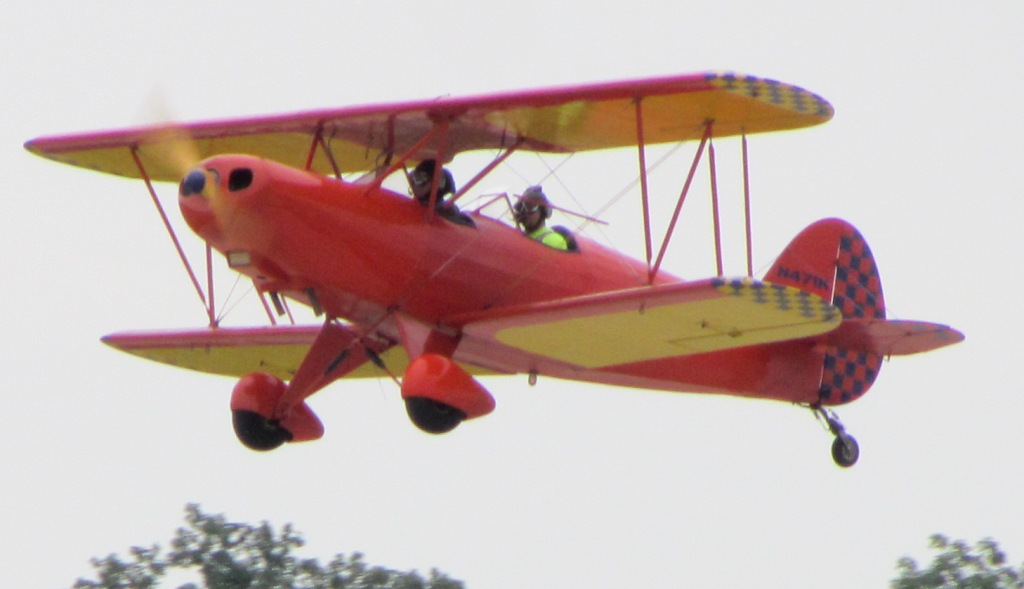
Hatz CB-1

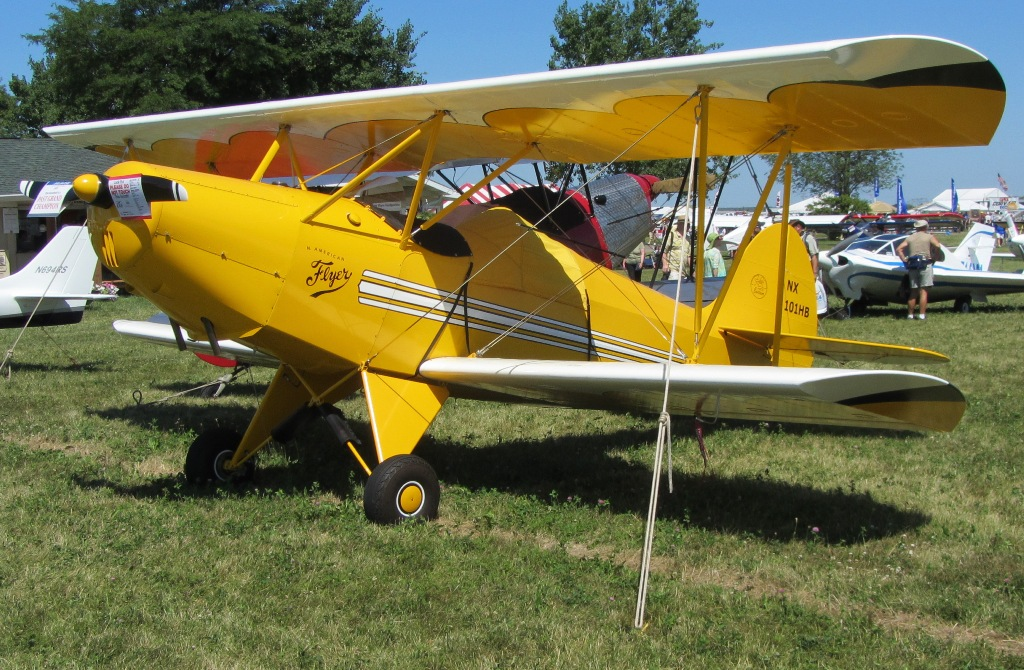
Hatz Bantam

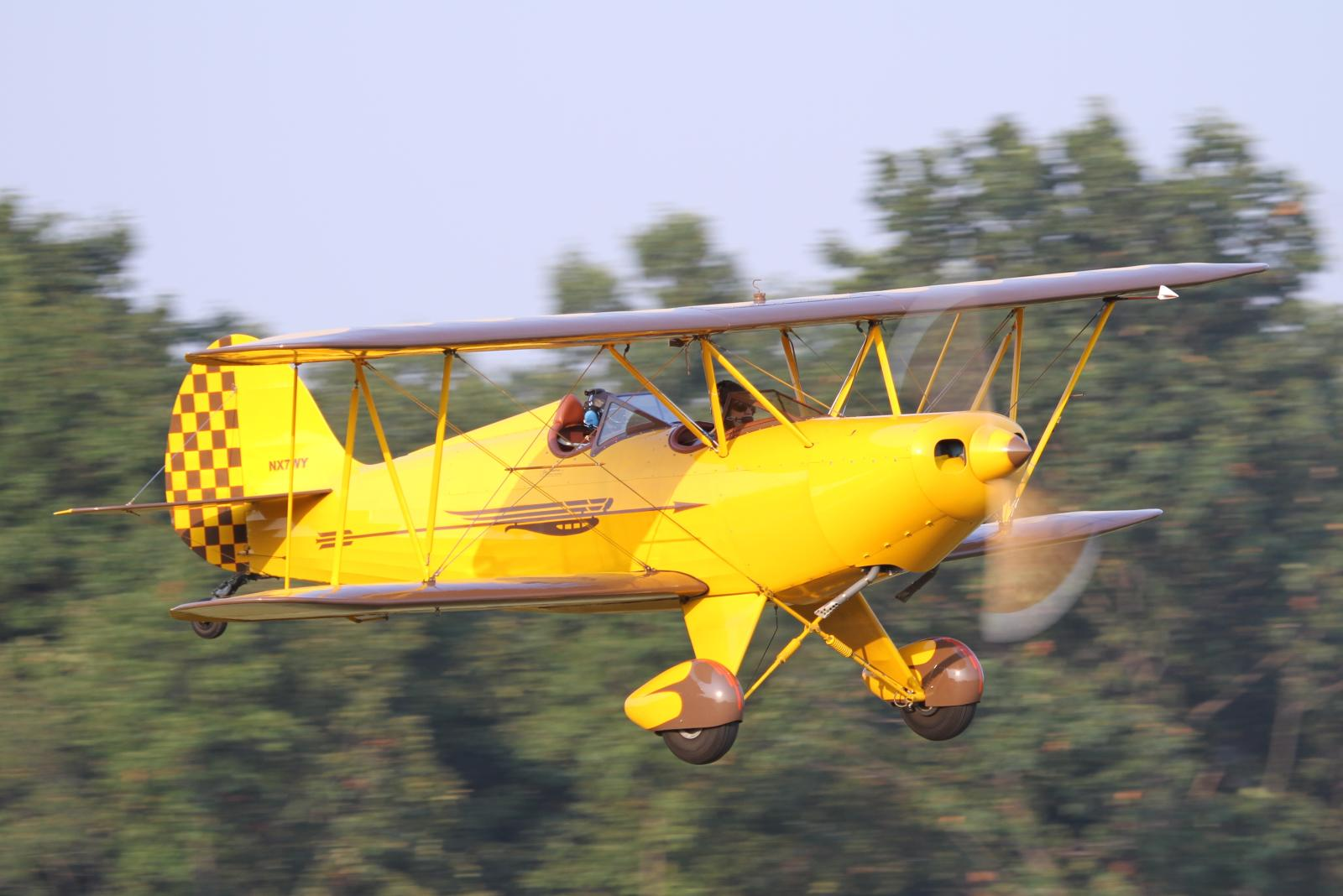
Hatz Classic

The Hatz CB-1 is a 1960s American light biplane designed by John Hatz for amateur construction. The Hatz Classic variant is supplied in kit form by Makelan Corp of New Braunfels, Texas, while the other variants are available as plans only.

== Design and development ==
John Hatz designed the CB-1 in 1968 as a smaller version of a Waco F series biplane. The CB-1 is a tandem dual-control two-seat biplane with fixed tailwheel landing gear and powered by a variety of nose-mounted small engines. Steel tube fuselage and tail with wooden wings. Plans and kits of parts for the CB-1 are available for amateur construction.

== Variants ==
CB-1
Base model
Hatz Classic
Designed by Billy Dawson, which has a stretched more rounded fuselage and powered by a Lycoming O-320.
Kelly-D
A simpler and larger variant of the Hatz, with the wing center section removed, designed by Dudley Kelly.
Hatz Bantam
A lighter model that fits the United States light-sport aircraft rules.

== Specifications (CB-1) ==
Data from Jane's All the World's Aircraft 1982–83

General characteristics

- Crew: 2
- Length: 19 ft 0 in (5.79 m)
- Wingspan: 25 ft 4 in (7.72 m)
- Height: 7 ft 10 in (2.39 m)
- Wing area: 178 sq ft (16.5 m^{2})
- Aspect ratio: 6.06:1
- Airfoil: Clark Y
- Empty weight: 875 lb (397 kg)
- Max takeoff weight: 1,600 lb (726 kg)
- Fuel capacity: 18 US gal (15 imp gal; 68 L)
- Powerplant: 1 × Lycoming O-235 air-cooled flat four, 115 hp (86 kW)
- Propellers: 2-bladed Sensenich fixed-pitch propeller, 5 ft 10 in (1.78 m) diameter

Performance

- Cruise speed: 90 mph (140 km/h, 78 kn) (max cruise)
- Stall speed: 40 mph (64 km/h, 35 kn)
- Never exceed speed: 150 mph (240 km/h, 130 kn)
- Range: 200 mi (320 km, 170 nmi) (30 minute reserves)
- Rate of climb: 800 ft/min (4.1 m/s)

== See also ==
Aircraft of comparable role, configuration, and era

- Westfall Sport
