= Poplar Grove Airport =

- IATA: none; ICAO: none; FAA LID: C77

Summary
- Airport type: Public
- Owner: Steve R. Thomas
- Location: Poplar Grove, Illinois
- Time zone: UTC−06:00 (-6)
  - Summer (DST): UTC−05:00 (-5)
- Elevation AMSL: 858 ft (262 m)
- Coordinates: 42.3229°N 88.8363°W

Map
- Location of airport in Illinois C77 (the United States)

Runways
Direction	Length		Surface
Direction	ft	m	Surface
12/30	3,773	1,150	Asphalt
9/27	2,709	826	Turf
17/35	2,467	752	Turf

Poplar Grove Airport (FAA LID: C77) is a small general aviation airport located in Poplar Grove, Illinois, United States. The airport was founded in 1972 as Belvidere Airport and renamed in 1994. It is located 3 miles south of Poplar Grove, and 3 miles north of Belvidere. The airport is privately owned and open to the public.

It is the home of the Poplar Grove Vintage Wings and Wheels Museum and BelAir Estates, a residential fly-in neighborhood.

The airport was named 2015 Illinois Private Airport of the Year by the Illinois Department of Transportation's Division of Aeronautics.

== Facilities and aircraft ==
The airport has three runways. Runway 12/30 is the airport's only paved runway and is 3773 x 50 ft (1150 x 15 m). Runways 9/27, which is 2709 x 200 ft (826. x 61 m), and 17/35, which is 2467 x 150 ft (752 x 46 m), are both made of turf.

For the 12-month period ending May 31, 2020, the airport averages 181 aircraft operations per day, or just over 66,000 per year. All traffic is classified as general aviation.

An aviation repair shop called Poplar Grove Airmotive is based on the airport. The shop services airframe, engine, and accessory needs and sells parts. 12 acres of land on the airport have been donated to the Poplar Grove Aviation and Education Association for the purposes of preserving 20th century aviation and educating the community, including offering scholarships for new pilots to begin flight training.

== Accidents and incidents ==
- On July 21, 2001, a pilot giving passenger rides in an experimental Kelly-D biplane crashed while operating at the Midwest Regional American Hatz Association fly-in. A witness reported that a piece of the aircraft appeared to detach and fall off after a series of aerobatic maneuvers. The aircraft then rolled over and spiraled into the ground. The probable cause of the accident was a right upper wing failure due to overload, with the aerobatic maneuvers as a contributing factor.
- On December 20, 2005, a Cessna 150 flown by a student pilot sustained substantial on impact with snow and terrain when the airplane exited runway 30 at the Poplar Grove Airport. The pilot reported his final approach was fast and flat, and he contacted the runway and bounced up and to the right. The aircraft subsequently impacted snow off the runway. The probable cause of the accident was found to be the student pilot's inadequate recovery from the bounced landing, and not maintaining airplane control during the landing.
- On February 23, 2008, a Cessna 140 was damaged during landing at Poplar Grove. The flight instructor aboard reported that he was in a steep right turn when he heard a "thump" which seemed to come from the tail section of the airplane. He leveled the wings and realized that he was "holding extreme right rudder with the pedal depressed to about three-fourths of its full travel." Upon coming back in to land, the instructor bled off airspeed as long as possible before touchdown and ran out of rudder just prior to touchdown. A postflight inspection of the aircraft revealed that a large section of the left wing's fabric had separated from the airplane. Nine wing ribs plus the main and rear spars from wing station 58 to wing station 176 were visible as a result of the missing wing fabric. The probable cause of the accident was found to be the separation of a left wing skin "fabric patch" from the wing ribs and spars for an undetermined reason.
- On February 12, 2011, a Cessna 172N Skyhawk piloted by a student pilot crashed during takeoff from Poplar Grove. The student pilot reported he lost directional control "due to over correction and misuse of the brake/rudder." The airplane exited the runway, impacted deep snow, and nosed over. The airplane sustained substantial wing and rudder damage when it nosed over. The probable cause was found to be the student pilot's failure to maintain directional control of the airplane during the takeoff.
- On July 23, 2011, a Luscombe 8 airplane attempted a midfield takeoff with approximately 1,800 feet of runway remaining, but the airplane was unable to clear the trees at the departure end of the runway. The pilot executed a right turn to the north but was unable to clear power lines that were along the airplane's course, so he performed an off airport landing. The probable cause of the accident was found to be the pilot's decision to not use all available runway length and his failure to abort the takeoff.
- On August 8, 2012, an experimental amateur-built Ristine Avid Mark IV airplane exited runway 12 at the Poplar Grove Airport. After landing practice in the airport's traffic pattern, there was a sudden, uncontrolled “jerk” to the left after touchdown The pilot indicated that the motion could not be stopped with opposite rudder and the aircraft rolled off the runway onto the smooth grass. The probable cause of the accident was found to be the failure of the lower right side longeron tail-spring support area during landing due to excessive corrosion.
- On April 30, 2016, a Cessna 140 crashed while on approach to Poplar Grove. Due to the night conditions and minimal lighting, the pilot was unable to see terrain. As the pilot initiated a descent toward the runway, the airplane impacted terrain in a wooded area about 4 nautical miles west of the runway threshold. The pilot reported that he did not observe the terrain any time before the impact but could see the bright runway lights. The probable cause of the crash was found to be the pilot's visual disorientation and failure to monitor the altimeter during a night approach, which resulted in controlled flight into terrain.
- On February 14, 2026, a Wittman Tailwind experimental aircraft crashed into a residential area near the Poplar Grove Airport while returning from a local fly-in. While the pilot's status is unclear, the crash caused a gas leak that required securing. An investigation into the crash is ongoing.

== See also ==
- List of airports in Illinois
