= Stolp SA-900 V-Star =

American light aircraft

SA-900 V-Star
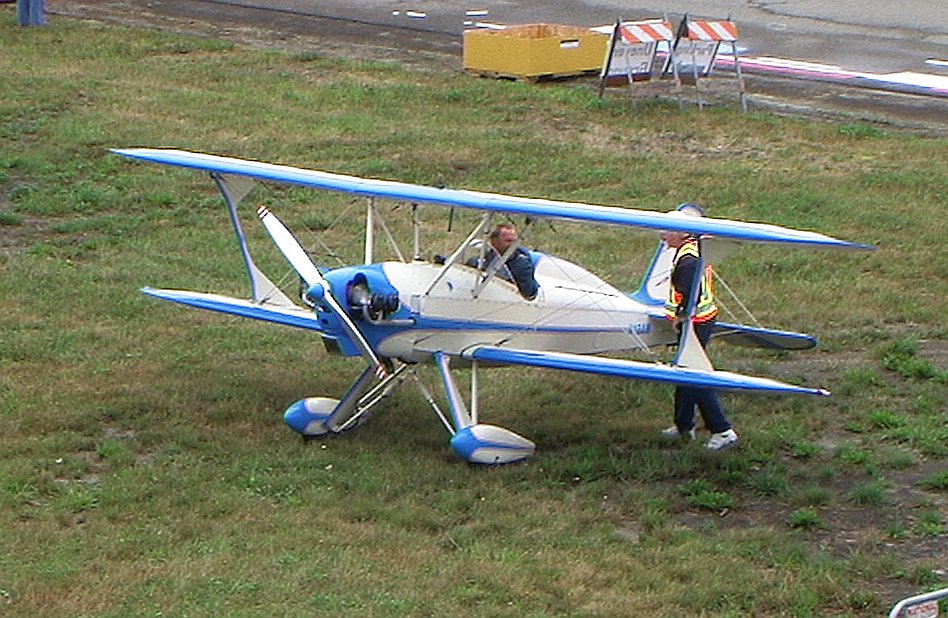

General information
- Type: Homebuilt aircraft
- National origin: United States
- Manufacturer: Stolp Starduster Corporation; Aircraft Spruce & Specialty Co
- Status: Plans available (2014)
- Number built: 65 (1998)

The Stolp SA-900 V-Star is an American aerobatic homebuilt biplane, currently produced by Aircraft Spruce & Specialty Co in the form of plans for amateur construction. In the 1990s it was also available as a kit from Stolp Starduster Corporation of Riverside, California.

== Design and development ==
The V-Star was designed as a low-cost, economical and easy to fly design, with a light wing loading and short runway requirements. It features a strut-braced biplane layout, with cabane struts, interplane struts and flying wires, a single-seat open cockpit, fixed conventional landing gear with wheel pants and a single engine in tractor configuration.

The aircraft fuselage is made from welded 4130 steel tubing. Its 23.00 ft (7.0 m) span wings are made from spruce and plywood, with the whole aircraft covered with doped aircraft fabric. The wings employ a Clark YH airfoil and have a total area of 141.0 sq ft (13.10 m^{2}). The engine used is the 65 hp (48 kW) Continental A65 or other similar powerplants.

The V-Star has a typical empty weight of 700 lb (320 kg) and a gross weight of 1,000 lb (450 kg), giving a useful load of 300 lb (140 kg). With full fuel of 15 U.S. gallons (57 L; 12 imp gal) the payload for the pilot and baggage is 210 lb (95 kg).

The standard day, sea level, no wind, take off with a 65 hp (48 kW) engine is 400 ft (122 m) and the landing roll is 600 ft (183 m).

The designer estimates the construction time from the kit that was available in the 1990s as 1800 hours.

== Operational history ==
By 1998 the company reported that 65 aircraft were completed and flying.

In March 2014, 13 examples were registered in the United States with the Federal Aviation Administration, although a total of 24 had been registered at one time. In Canada in March 2014 there were two registered with Transport Canada and in the United Kingdom a further two were registered with the CAA.

== Specifications (V-Star) ==
Data from AeroCrafter and The Incomplete Guide to Airfoil Usage

General characteristics

- Crew: one
- Length: 17 ft 0 in (5.18 m)
- Wingspan: 23 ft 0 in (7.01 m)
- Wing area: 141.0 sq ft (13.10 m^{2})
- Airfoil: Clark YH
- Empty weight: 700 lb (318 kg)
- Gross weight: 1,000 lb (454 kg)
- Fuel capacity: 15 U.S. gallons (57 L; 12 imp gal)
- Powerplant: 1 × Continental A65 four cylinder, air-cooled, four stroke aircraft engine, 65 hp (48 kW)
- Propellers: 2-bladed wooden, fixed pitch

Performance

- Maximum speed: 90 mph (140 km/h, 78 kn)
- Cruise speed: 75 mph (121 km/h, 65 kn)
- Stall speed: 35 mph (56 km/h, 30 kn)
- Range: 280 mi (450 km, 240 nmi)
- g limits: +/-6g (operational), +/-9g (ultimate)
- Rate of climb: 600 ft/min (3.0 m/s)
- Wing loading: 7.1 lb/sq ft (35 kg/m^{2})

== See also ==
- List of aerobatic aircraft
