= Westfall Sport =

General information
- Type: Biplane
- National origin: United States of America
- Manufacturer: Miles Westfall
- Designer: Miles Westfall
- Number built: 1

History
- First flight: 1934

The Westfall Sport is a single seat biplane modeled after the Waco F2.

== Development ==
Miles Westfall was born in 1901, and raised in New Richmond, Indiana. At age 6 his passion for flying machines was ignited when he saw a group of balloons fly over his house. He brought this passion to life as an adult. He made a living in Oklahoma City by running a cafe, tuning pianos, and selling restored pianos. He built his first airplane in 1930, a Church Midwing JC-1, using a motorcycle engine for propulsion.

After his experience with the Midwing, Westfall began planning an aircraft of his own design. This resulted in his Sport, first flown in 1934.

== Design ==
The Westfall Sport had a welded steel tube fuselage with fabric covering. Its biplane wings were positively staggered, and were made of wood. It initially flew powered by a Ford automobile engine. Westfall mounted a cooling radiator ahead of the engine as in an automobile, cutting a hole through to allow a propeller shaft. After some experience with this layout, he replaced it with a modified OX-5 radiator below the cowling. By 1935, Westfall had reworked the airplane to use a LeBlond radial engine rated at 65 hp.

== Operational history ==
The prototype was finished and test flown in Oklahoma City in 1934. After replacing the Sport's Ford Model A engine and modified OX-5 radiator with an air-cooled 65-hp LeBlond radial, Westfall logged 1000 hours flying air tours across the United States. Just before the war began, the US Civil Aeronautics Administration mounted a crackdown against homebuilt aircraft, and Westfall was sent to jail for several months as an example to other experimenters.

== Variants ==
By 1964 Westfall desired a two-place airplane, and began designing a negative-stagger biplane which he named the Mark V Special, a loose reinterpretation of the Beechcraft Model 17 Staggerwing. It had steel-tube fabric-covered fuselage and wood wings, a streamlined windscreen and Cessna-type spring main landing gear. The project took nearly eight years to completion. Westfall flew the airplane to Oshkosh in 1978.

Westfall's Special was noted for its excellent landing characteristics and gentle stall, a result of installing its lower wing at a lower angle of attack than the upper and of using wings of unequal span. The airfoil was a Boeing 106R. The 43-inch-chord wings were separated by a 46-inch gap. The aerodynamics resulting from this arrangement were analyzed by William H Durand in a series of articles in EAA's Sport Aviation magazine.

The fuselage is 21 feet 2 inches long with a 42-inch-wide cabin. The forward-mounted fuel tank held 30 gallons, and it was powered by a Lycoming O-290 (125 hp) and a metal propeller.

== Designer death ==
Miles Westfall died on 27 April 1979, not long after introducing his Mark V Special to the aviation community. His aviation output was summarized in a 2006 magazine article.

== Specifications (Westfall Sport) ==
Data from Experimenter

General characteristics

- Crew: 1
- Length: 15 ft 4 in (4.67 m)
- Upper wingspan: 25 ft (7.6 m)
- Lower wingspan: 23 ft (7.0 m)
- Airfoil: Clark Y
- Empty weight: 460 lb (209 kg)
- Fuel capacity: 15 gall
- Powerplant: 1 × Leblond radial , 65 hp (48 kW)

Performance

- Maximum speed: 100 kn (120 mph, 190 km/h)
- Cruise speed: 96 kn (110 mph, 180 km/h)
- Stall speed: 19 kn (22 mph, 35 km/h)

== Notes ==
Prototype currently owned by Paul Agaliotis in California.
