= Poplar Grove Vintage Wings and Wheels Museum =

Coordinates: 42°19′32″N 88°50′19″W

- Established: 1997
- Location: Poplar Grove Airport, near Poplar Grove, Illinois, United States
- Type: Transportation museum
- Website: www.wingsandwheelsmuseum.org

The Poplar Grove Vintage Wings and Wheels Museum is a transportation museum at Poplar Grove Airport, south of Poplar Grove, Illinois. Operated by the nonprofit Poplar Grove Aviation Education Association, it presents aviation and automobile history from 1903 to 1957 on a 12-acre (4.9 ha) campus of relocated early-20th-century hangars and garages.

== History ==
The idea for the museum began in 1996, and the Poplar Grove Aviation Education Association was chartered in 1997. Organizers received a 12-acre site at the airport and acquired a Works Progress Administration-era hangar from Waukesha County Airport in Wisconsin that had been slated for demolition. Volunteers dismantled the stone building, moved it to Poplar Grove, and reconstructed it as the museum's main building, a role it had assumed by 2003.

The museum established its Youth Exploring Aviation program in 2001. Working with Experimental Aircraft Association Chapter 1414, it developed youth restoration projects and aviation programs. The museum and chapter jointly received the Illinois Aviation Hall of Fame's Spirit of Flight Award in 2019 for their aviation education, youth mentoring, and preservation work.

In 2016, the museum and EAA chapter announced plans to build a full-scale Curtiss JN-4 Jenny for the museum. Construction began in 2017 and took approximately 22,000 volunteer hours. The aircraft first flew in late 2021 and appeared at EAA AirVenture Oshkosh in 2022, where it received the Replica Aircraft Champion Bronze Lindy.

== Collections and programs ==
The campus includes the relocated Waukesha Hangar, two other 1930s aircraft hangars, a former Wisconsin automobile garage known as Slim's Garage, and a Sunoco filling station. Its collections consist of donated and loaned aircraft, automobiles, and other transportation artifacts. The museum also conducts field trips, camps, lectures, and aviation scholarships.
