= Stolp Acroduster Too =

Stolp SA 750 Acroduster Too
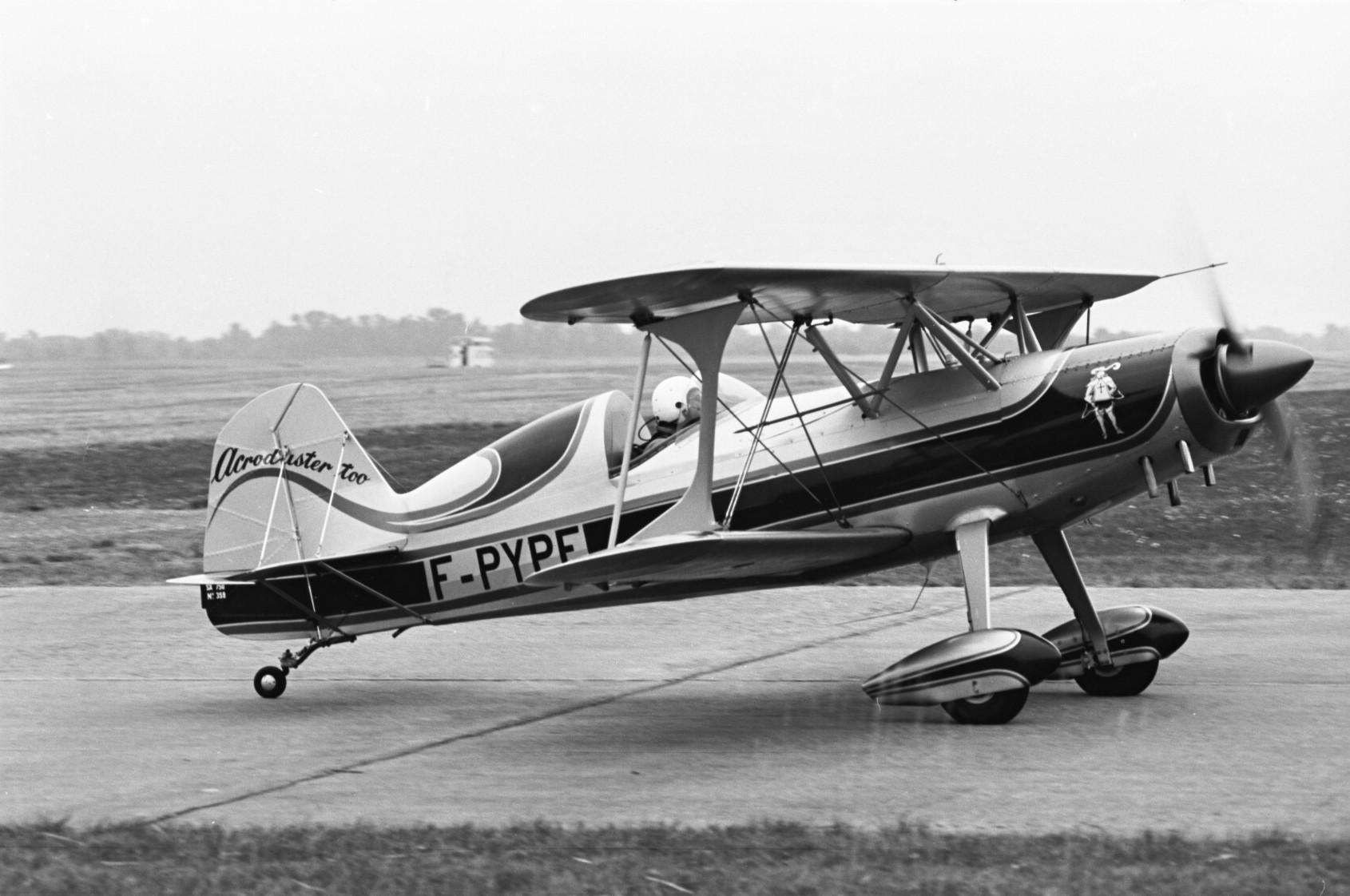

General information
- Type: Homebuilt aerobatic biplane
- National origin: United States of America
- Manufacturer: Stolp Starduster Corporation; Aircraft Spruce & Specialty
- Designer: Lou Stolp, Morgan Schrack
- Status: Plans available (2012)

History
- Introduction date: 1971
- Developed from: Stolp Acroduster I

The Stolp SA 750 Acroduster Too is an American two place homebuilt aerobatic biplane, stressed to plus or minus 9g. The aircraft was introduced in 1971 and is supplied in the form of plans and some parts for amateur construction by Aircraft Spruce & Specialty.

== Design and development ==
The Acroduster Too is a scaled down version of the Stolp Starduster Too. It was originally named the Schrack-Stolp Super Starduster Too. Much of the redesign of the SA-300 was done by TWA pilot Morgan Schrack.

The aerobatic aircraft is described as having a sharp stall, and ability to keep wings level using rudder alone. The Acroduster has shorter span and length, has larger ailerons than the Starduster Too, and has a stronger tail.

The aircraft is constructed with fabric covered 4130 steel tube structure and spruce wing spars. Ribs are plywood with cap strips.

== Specifications ==
Data from Aircraft Spruce.

General characteristics

- Crew: one
- Capacity: one passenger
- Length: 19 ft (5.8 m)
- Wingspan: 21 ft 6 in (6.55 m)
- Wing area: 140 sq ft (13 m^{2})
- Powerplant: 1 × Lycoming IO-360 , 200 hp (150 kW)
- Propellers: constant speed propeller

Performance

- Cruise speed: 140 kn (160 mph, 260 km/h)
- Stall speed: 48 kn (55 mph, 89 km/h)
- Rate of climb: 2,500 ft/min (13 m/s)

== See also ==
Aircraft of comparable role, configuration, and era

- Steen Skybolt

Related lists

- List of aerobatic aircraft
