= Mirage Marathon =

American two-seat homebuilt aircraft

Marathon

General information
- Type: Homebuilt aircraft
- National origin: United States
- Manufacturer: Mirage Aircraft Corporation
- Status: In production (2014)
- Number built: one

History
- Developed from: Mirage Celerity

The Mirage Marathon is an American homebuilt aircraft, designed and produced by Mirage Aircraft Corporation of Prescott Valley, Arizona. The aircraft is supplied in the form of plans for amateur construction, with materials kits supplied by Aircraft Spruce & Specialty Co. and Wicks Aircraft Supply as well as some specialized parts supplied by the manufacturer.

== Design and development ==
The Marathon is a fixed landing gear development of the retractable landing gear equipped Mirage Celerity which was designed by Larry Burton. The design goals include high performance cross county flying at low cost.

The Marathon features a cantilever low-wing, a two-seats-in-side-by-side configuration enclosed cockpit, fixed tricycle landing gear or optionally conventional landing gear with wheel pants and a single engine in tractor configuration.

The aircraft is made from wood, foam and fiberglass. Its 25.00 ft (7.6 m) span wing mounts flaps and has a wing area of 100.0 sq ft (9.29 m^{2}). The cabin width is 40 in (100 cm). The acceptable power range is 150 to 180 hp (112 to 134 kW) and the standard engines used are the 160 hp (119 kW) Chevrolet V-6 automobile conversion powerplant along with Lycoming aircraft engines, as well as Subaru, Mazda and Ford Motors V-6 automotive engines.

The factory provides some specialized parts for the construction of the aircraft, including leading edge fuel tanks, the aircraft canopy and landing gear.

The Marathon has a typical empty weight of 1,119 lb (508 kg) and a gross weight of 1,825 lb (828 kg), giving a useful load of 706 lb (320 kg). With full fuel of 50 U.S. gallons (190 L; 42 imp gal) the payload for the pilot, passenger and baggage is 406 lb (184 kg).

The standard day, sea level, no wind, take off with a 160 hp (119 kW) engine is 800 ft (244 m) and the landing roll is 1,000 ft (305 m).

== Operational history ==
By 1998 the company reported that ten kits had been sold.

In January 2014 one example was registered in the United States with the Federal Aviation Administration.

== Specifications (Marathon) ==
Data from AeroCrafter

General characteristics

- Crew: one
- Capacity: one passenger
- Length: 22.80 ft (6.95 m)
- Wingspan: 25 ft 0 in (7.62 m)
- Wing area: 100.0 sq ft (9.29 m^{2})
- Empty weight: 1,119 lb (508 kg)
- Gross weight: 1,825 lb (828 kg)
- Fuel capacity: 50 U.S. gallons (190 L; 42 imp gal)
- Powerplant: 1 × Chevrolet V-6 cylinder, liquid-cooled, four stroke automotive engine, 160 hp (120 kW)

Performance

- Maximum speed: 200 mph (320 km/h, 170 kn)
- Cruise speed: 185 mph (298 km/h, 161 kn)
- Stall speed: 55 mph (89 km/h, 48 kn) flaps down
- Range: 800 mi (1,300 km, 700 nmi)
- Service ceiling: 20,000 ft (6,100 m)
- Rate of climb: 1,500 ft/min (7.6 m/s)
- Wing loading: 18.25 lb/sq ft (89.1 kg/m^{2})
