= Makelan Corporation =

American homebuilt aircraft manufacturer

- Company type: Privately held company
- Industry: Aerospace
- Founded: Late 1990s
- Headquarters: New Braunfels, Texas, United States
- Key people: J. W. (Jeff) Shoemake (owner); Sylvia Shoemake (manager)
- Products: Kit aircraft
- Website: website archives

The Makelan Corporation is an American aircraft manufacturer based in New Braunfels, Texas. The company provides kits for the Hatz Classic biplane design.

J. W. (Jeff) Shoemake is the company owner, while Sylvia Shoemake is manager.

The company's sole product is a development of the Hatz CB-1, that was designed by John Hatz in the 1960s. The Hatz Classic is an improved model with additional cockpit room, designed by Billy Dawson of Seguin, Texas in the 1990s. Dawson's prototype first flew in 1996 and won several awards, including Reserve Grand Champion - Plans Built at Airventure 1996, Grand Champion Experimental and Reserve Grand Champion Open Cockpit - Biplane at the 1997 Biplane Expo and Grand Champion - Plans Built at AirVenture 1997.

By 1998 the company reported that five Hatz Classic kits had been sold and three aircraft were completed and flying. In September 2014 twelve examples were registered in the United States with the Federal Aviation Administration.

== Aircraft ==
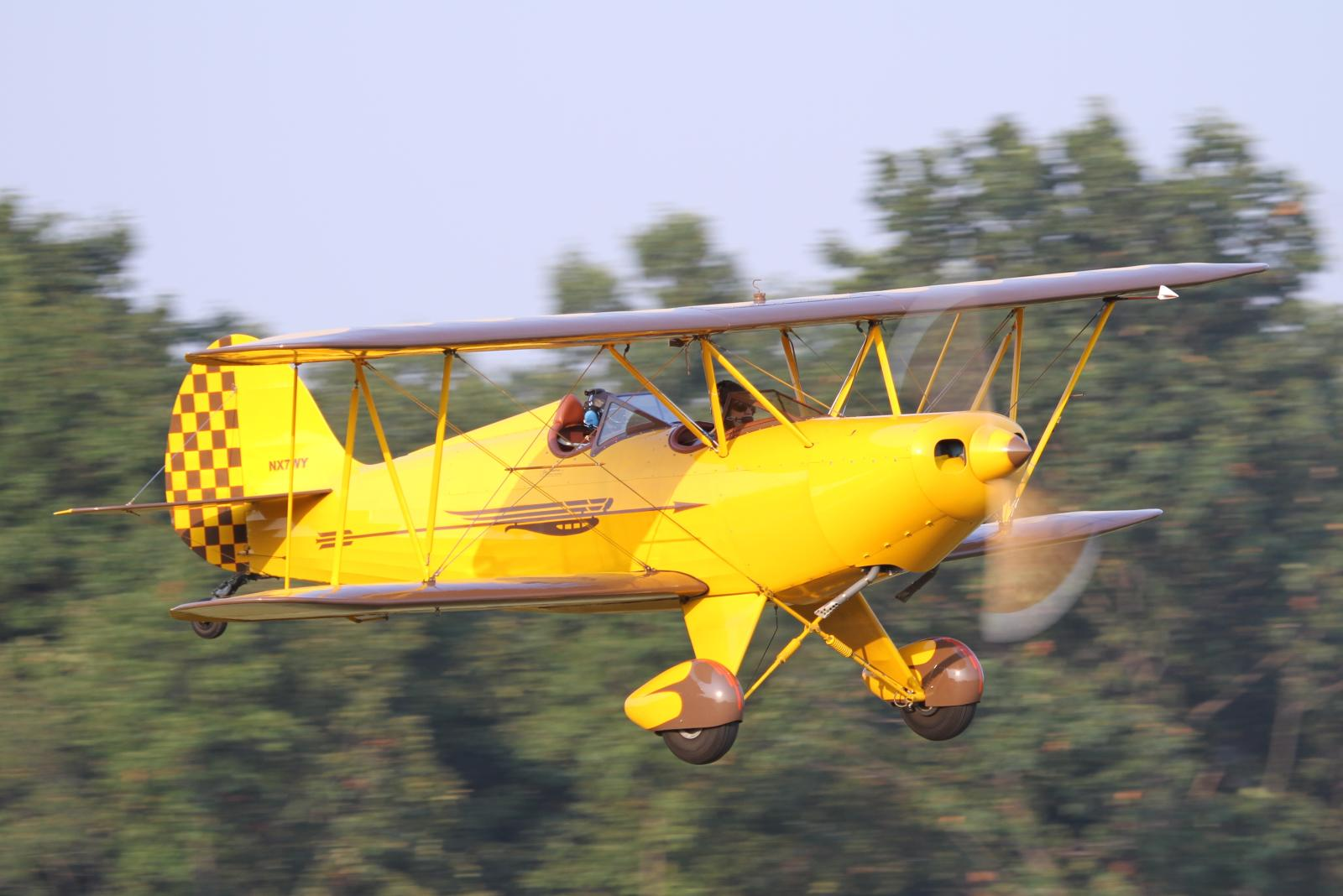
Hatz Classic in flight

Summary of aircraft built by Makelan Corporation
Model name	First flight	Number built	Type
Hatz Classic	1990s	at least 12	homebuilt biplane
