= Corby Starlet =

Starlet
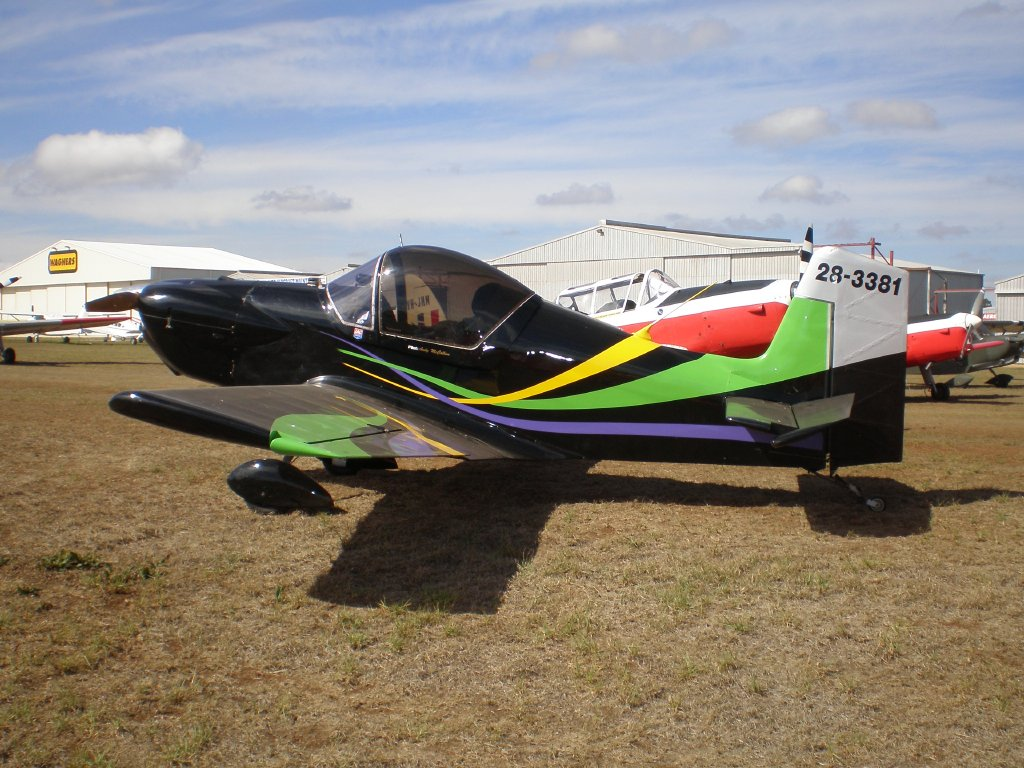
- Corby Starlet at Toowoomba Airshow, May 2007.

General information
- Type: Homebuilt aircraft
- Designer: John C. Corby

History
- Introduction date: 1973

The Corby CJ-1 Starlet is a single seat, amateur-built aeroplane designed in the 1960s by Australian aeronautical engineer John Corby.

== Design and development ==
The original design of the Starlet took place while John Corby and Barrie Bishton, a fellow aircraft engineer at Qantas, were seconded to assist the fledgling Singapore Airlines in 1961, to develop a training school for aircraft engineers. John and Barrie would spend hours developing the plans that would become the Starlet. When they went back to Australia, this continued until the Starlet's maiden flight.

Bishton later purchased the wreck of the original Starlet (registration VH-CBS - ie "Corby Bishton Starlet"), and built it again. This replica had its maiden flight in 2015 , and was then donated by Bishton to the Historical Aviation Restoration Society (HARS museum) Albion Park, NSW, Australia.

The CJ-1 Starlet's structure is primarily wood and finished with fabric. A variety of engine types have been used, including 50 to 80 hp (37 to 60 kW) Volkswagen air-cooled engines, the 80 hp (60 kW) Rotax 912UL and the 85 hp (63 kW) Jabiru 2200.

The aircraft is built from plans, although some parts are available as well. Additionally Aircraft Spruce & Specialty offer materials kits for the design.

== Variants ==
CJ-1
Base model, made from wood
CM-2
Model built from aluminium sheet, developed in New Zealand

== Specifications (typical) ==
General characteristics

- Crew: one pilot
- Length: 4.5 m (14 ft 9 in)
- Wingspan: 5.72 m (18 ft 6 in)
- Wing area: 6.4 m^{2} (69 sq ft)
- Empty weight: 230 kg (500 lb)
- Gross weight: 340 kg (750 lb)
- Powerplant: 1 × Volkswagen air-cooled engine or Jabiru 2200 , 52–64 kW (70–85 hp)

Performance

- Maximum speed: 260 km/h (160 mph, 140 kn)
- Range: 685 km (425 mi, 369 nmi)
- Rate of climb: 5.6 m/s (1,100 ft/min)
