= Mirage Celerity =

American two-seat homebuilt aircraft

Celerity

General information
- Type: Homebuilt light aircraft
- National origin: United States
- Manufacturer: Mirage Aircraft
- Designer: Larry Burton
- Number built: 4

History
- First flight: 18 May 1985
- Variant: Mirage Marathon

The Mirage Celerity is an American two-seat cabin monoplane designed by Larry Burton and with plans for home building sold by Mirage Aircraft of Tucson AZ, United States.

== Design and development ==
The Celerity is a side-by-side two-seat low-wing cabin monoplane built from a mixture of composites and wood. Nominally powered by a 160 hp (119 kW) Lycoming O-320-B1A piston engine and with a retractable conventional landing gear.

== Operational history ==
In September 2014 three examples were registered in the United States with the Federal Aviation Administration, although a total of four had been registered at one time.

== Specifications ==
Data from Brassey's World Aircraft & Systems Directory

General characteristics

- Crew: 2
- Length: 21 ft 6 in (6.55 m)
- Wingspan: 23 ft 10 in (7.26 m)
- Empty weight: 1,169 lb (530 kg)
- Gross weight: 1,825 lb (828 kg)
- Powerplant: 1 × Lycoming O-320-B1A , 160 hp (119 kW)

Performance

- Maximum speed: 220 mph (354 km/h, 190 kn)
- Stall speed: 53 mph (86 km/h, 46 kn)
- Range: 1,000 mi (1,609 km, 870 nmi)
- Rate of climb: 1,800 ft/min (549 m/s)
