= Aircraft Spruce & Specialty Company =

American aircraft part producer

Aircraft Spruce & Specialty Co.
- Industry: Transportation equipment and supplies
- Founded: 1965
- Founder: Bob and Flo Irwin
- Headquarters: Corona, California, United States
- Number of locations: Corona, California, US; West Chicago, Illinois, US; Peachtree City, Georgia, US; Wasilla, Alaska, US; Brantford, Ontario, Canada
- Products: Aircraft parts, plans and kits
- Number of employees: 300
- Divisions: Aircraft Spruce East, West, Midwest, Alaska, and Canada
- Website: www.aircraftspruce.com

Aircraft Spruce & Specialty Co. is an American producer of aircraft parts and services including plans for homebuilt aircraft.

== History ==
Aircraft Spruce Co. was founded in 1965 by Bob and Flo Irwin as a follow-on to founding Fullerton Air Parts. Initially the company sold only one product: aircraft grade spruce lumber for aircraft construction and restoration. Aircraft Spruce Co. added more products and adopted the name Aircraft Spruce & Specialty Co.

Jim Irwin, Bob and Flo's older son, managed kit programs such as the Vari-Eze in 1975 while still in college. In 1978 Jim acquired the company, and he became president in 1980.

Aircraft Spruce was housed in Fullerton, California, from 1965 until 1997 in a historic Fullerton former citrus packing house. It then moved to a 62,000-square-foot (5,800 m^{2}) facility in Corona, California. Aircraft Spruce East moved to a new 52,000 sq ft (4,800 m^{2}) facility in Peachtree City, Georgia, in 2004. Aircraft Spruce Canada was opened in Toronto in 2006, and moved to the Brantford, Ontario Airport in 2008 with a new 20,000 sq ft (1,900 m^{2}) facility coming online in 2016. In 2019, Aircraft Spruce opened two new facilities with Aircraft Spruce Midwest operating in a 50,000-square-foot (4,600 m^{2}) facility in West Chicago, Illinois, and Aircraft Spruce Alaska in a 15,000-square-foot (1,400 m^{2}) building in Wasilla, Alaska.

Ron Alexander's Alexander Aeroplane Company was purchased and integrated into the company in January 1996. The Aviation Book Company was purchased in late 2014.

It integrated PilotShop.com into its business in August 2014.

Founder Bob Irwin died on 26 June 2015 at his home in Lake Havasu City, Arizona.

=== Expansion ===
The company acquired the estate of Paul Poberezny in 2017.

It acquired A.E.R.O. in Stock in September 2018.

The company opened a new 52,000 sq ft (4,800 m^{2}) midwestern facility in West Chicago, Illinois in September 2019.

A new 35,000 sq ft (3,300 m^{2}) distribution center was opened in Middletown, Pennsylvania in 2023. Eastern Aero Supply was acquired the following year. In July, a 1,900 m^{2} (20,000 sq ft) branch was announced in Melbourne, Australia. The company acquired Wag-Aero two months later. Aircraft Spruce, along with Aero Performance, opened a sixth location of 38,000 sq ft (3,500 m^{2}) in Roanoke, Texas on 8 March 2025.

== Locations ==
Company locations, Alaska and Australia not shown

Aircraft Spruce operates the following locations:

- West – Corona, California
- Southwest – Chandler, Arizona
- Central – Roanoke, Texas
- Midwest – West Chicago, Illinois
- Northeast – Middletown, Pennsylvania
- East – Peachtree City, Georgia
- Alaska – Palmer, Alaska
- Canada – Brantford, Ontario
- Australia – Keysborough, Victoria

== Products ==
Aircraft Spruce has the rights to sell kits and plans for a large selection of homebuilt aircraft.

- Acro Sport I
- Acro Sport II
- Acroduster
- Acrolite
- Alfa HB207
- AquaJet X
- Aviat
- Baby Great Lakes
- Bakeng Deuce
- Barracuda
- Bearhawk
- Breezy
- Bushcaddy
- Cadet
- Celerity
- Christavia Mk I
- Christavia Mk IV
- Corby Starlet
- Cozy MK IV
- Culp
- Daisy Mae
- Easy Eagle
- Europa XS
- Fly Baby
- Fred
- Glasair
- Glass Goose
- GP4 and Osprey
- Howland H-2 Honey Bee
- Howland H-3 Pegasus
- Hummingbird Helicopter
- Kelly-D (partial kit)
- Kitfox
- KR
- Lightning
- Meyers Little Toot
- Mirage Celerity
- Mirage Marathon
- Murphy Rebel
- Nesmith Cougar
- Nexaer
- NuVenture
- One Design
- P-51
- Pazmany
- Pietenpol
- Pitts
- Pober
- Pulsar
- RAF
- Rans
- Rihn DR-107 One Design
- Rotorway
- Safari
- Scotty Bowlin
- Sky Arrow
- Skybolt
- Sonerai
- Sonex
- Stallion
- Starduster
- Starlet
- Stewart Mustang
- Summit II
- Thorp
- Tundra
- V-Star
- Vans
- Velocity
- Volksplanes
- Volmer
- Vulcan C100
- Whisper Aircraft
- Wittman Buttercup
- Wittman Tailwind
- Zenith

== See also ==
- Univair Aircraft Corporation
