= Elmwood Christavia Mk IV =

Canadian homebuilt light aircraft

Christavia Mk IV
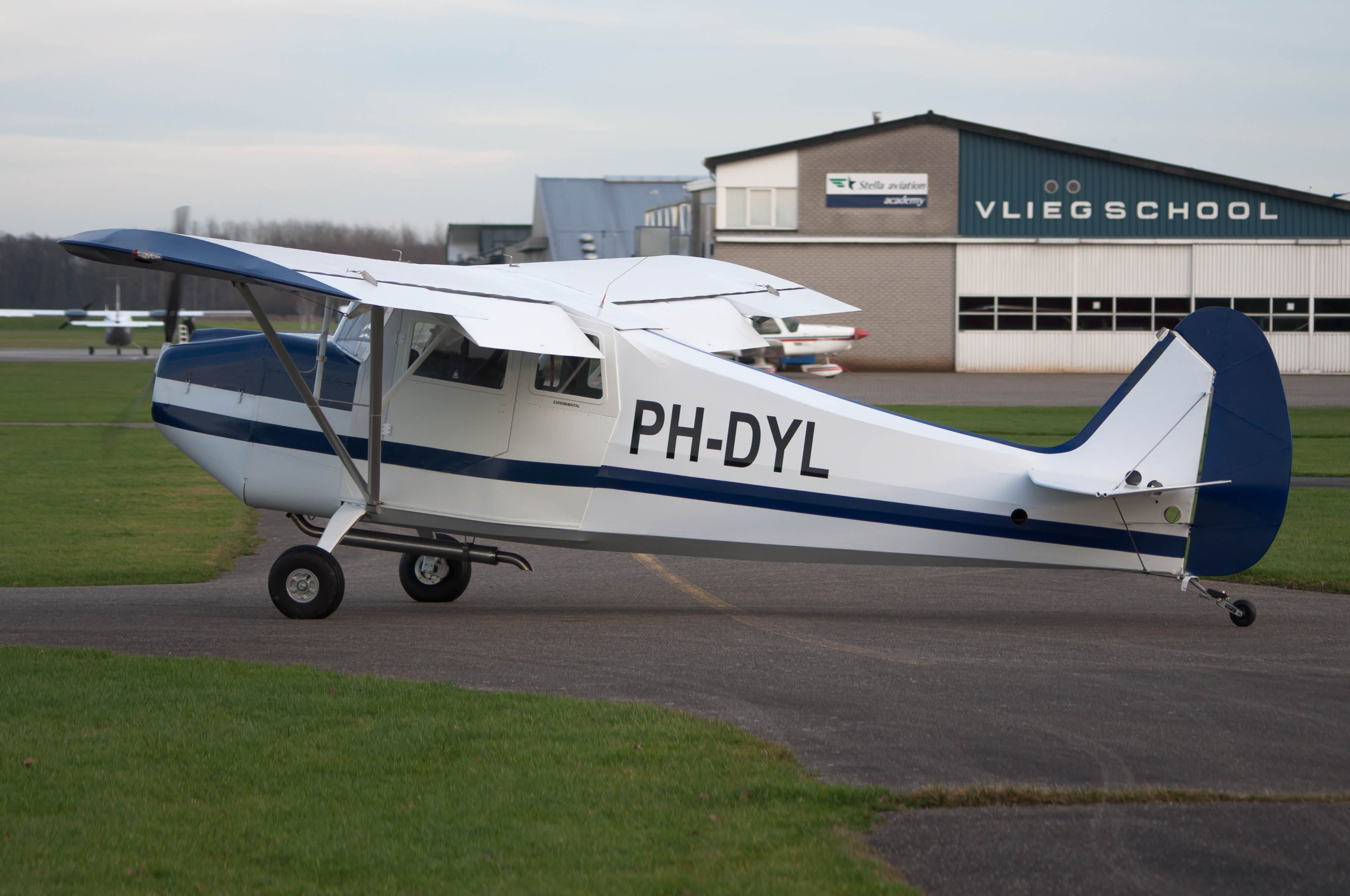

General information
- Type: Homebuilt aircraft
- National origin: Canada
- Manufacturer: Elmwood Aviation
- Designer: Ron Mason
- Status: Plans available (2013)
- Number built: 250

History
- Developed from: Christavia Mk I

The Christavia Mk IV (Christ-in-Aviation) is a Canadian homebuilt aircraft that was designed by Ron Mason and produced by Elmwood Aviation of Frankford, Ontario (formerly in Belleville, Ontario). The aircraft is supplied in the form of plans for amateur construction.

== Design and development ==
Designed for African missionary work the Mark IV is a development of the Christavia Mk I, with greater wingspan, a longer fuselage and two additional seats. The aircraft features a strut-braced high-wing, a four-seat enclosed cabin with doors, fixed conventional landing gear and a single engine in tractor configuration.

The aircraft fuselage is made from welded 4130 steel tubing, while the wing is of all-wooden construction, with all surfaces covered with doped aircraft fabric. Later models have an aluminum wing spar. Its 35.50 ft (10.8 m) span wing employs a custom Mason airfoil, mounts flaps and has a wing area of 177.3 sq ft (16.47 m^{2}). The wing is supported by "V" struts with jury struts. The standard engine used is the 150 hp (112 kW) Lycoming O-320 powerplant.

The Christavia Mk IV has a typical empty weight of 1,100 lb (500 kg) and a gross weight of 2,200 lb (1,000 kg), giving a useful load of 1,100 lb (500 kg). With full fuel of 41 U.S. gallons (160 L; 34 imp gal) the payload for crew, passengers and baggage is 854 lb (387 kg).

Plans are marketed by Aircraft Spruce & Specialty Co. Ron Mason sold the rights to the Christavia series of aircraft to Aircraft Spruce and no longer supplies the plans or support. The designer estimates the construction time from the supplied plans as 2600 hours.

== Operational history ==
By 1998 the designer reported that 250 examples were flying.

In December 2016 five examples were registered in the United States with the Federal Aviation Administration and eight with Transport Canada.

== Specifications (Christavia Mk IV) ==
Data from AeroCrafter and The Incomplete Guide to Airfoil Usage

General characteristics

- Crew: one
- Capacity: three passengers
- Length: 22 ft 3 in (6.78 m)
- Wingspan: 35 ft 6 in (10.82 m)
- Wing area: 177.3 sq ft (16.47 m^{2})
- Airfoil: Mason
- Empty weight: 1,100 lb (499 kg)
- Gross weight: 2,200 lb (998 kg)
- Fuel capacity: 41 U.S. gallons (160 L; 34 imp gal)
- Powerplant: 1 × Lycoming O-320 four cylinder, air-cooled, four stroke aircraft engine, 150 hp (110 kW)
- Propellers: 2-bladed fixed pitch

Performance

- Maximum speed: 130 mph (210 km/h, 110 kn)
- Cruise speed: 120 mph (190 km/h, 100 kn)
- Stall speed: 48 mph (77 km/h, 42 kn)
- Range: 400 mi (640 km, 350 nmi)
- Service ceiling: 19,000 ft (5,800 m)
- Rate of climb: 800 ft/min (4.1 m/s)
- Wing loading: 12.4 lb/sq ft (61 kg/m^{2})
