= Kelly-D =

American homebuilt aircraft

General information
- Type: Homebuilt aircraft
- National origin: United States
- Designer: Dudley R. Kelly
- Status: Plans available (2014)
- Number built: 20

History
- Introduction date: 1981
- Developed from: Hatz CB-1

The Kelly-D is an American homebuilt aircraft that was designed by Dudley R. Kelly of Versailles, Kentucky, in 1981. When it was available, the aircraft was supplied in the form of plans for amateur construction. Aircraft Spruce & Specialty Co still provides some spruce wing parts for the design.

Dudley R. Kelly died on 20 September 1998. After his death, his widow, Thelma Kelly continued selling plans for a time; they are now sold by the Hatz Biplane Association.

== Design and development ==
The Kelly-D is a development of the Hatz CB-1, but with more wingspan and fuselage length, and with more cockpit space for larger pilots. It features a strut-braced biplane layout, two seats in separate tandem open cockpits with individual windshields, fixed conventional landing gear and a single engine in tractor configuration.

The aircraft is made from a combination of 4130 steel tubing and wood, with all surfaces covered in doped aircraft fabric. Its 26.30 ft (8.0 m) span wing is made with a spruce structure and has a wing area of 230.00 sq ft (21.368 m^{2}). The wings are detachable for ground transportation and storage. The standard engine used is the 115 hp (86 kW) Lycoming O-235 four stroke powerplant.

The Kelly-D has a typical empty weight of 925 lb (420 kg) and a gross weight of 1,500 lb (680 kg), giving a useful load of 575 lb (261 kg). With full fuel of 24 U.S. gallons (91 L; 20 imp gal) the payload for pilot, passenger and baggage is 431 lb (195 kg).

The designer estimated the construction time from the supplied kit as 4000 hours. In 1983, it could be built, with a used engine, for about US$8,000.

== Operational history ==
By 1998 the Dudley reported that 20 kits were completed and flying.

In January 2014, 13 examples were registered in the United States with the Federal Aviation Administration, although a total of 16 had been registered at one time. Also in 2014 there was one registered with Transport Canada.

== Specifications (Kelly-D) ==
Data from AeroCrafter

General characteristics

- Crew: one
- Capacity: one passenger
- Length: 19 ft 3 in (5.87 m)
- Wingspan: 26 ft 4 in (8.03 m)
- Wing area: 230.0 sq ft (21.37 m^{2})
- Empty weight: 925 lb (420 kg)
- Gross weight: 1,500 lb (680 kg)
- Fuel capacity: 24 U.S. gallons (91 L; 20 imp gal)
- Powerplant: 1 × Lycoming O-235 four cylinder, air-cooled, four stroke aircraft engine, 115 hp (86 kW)
- Propellers: 2-bladed fixed pitch

Performance

- Maximum speed: 100 mph (160 km/h, 87 kn)
- Cruise speed: 90 mph (140 km/h, 78 kn)
- Stall speed: 40 mph (64 km/h, 35 kn)
- Range: 275 mi (443 km, 239 nmi)
- Rate of climb: 825 ft/min (4.19 m/s)
- Wing loading: 6.5 lb/sq ft (32 kg/m^{2})
