= Elmwood Christavia Mk I =

Canadian homebuilt light aircraft

Christavia Mk I
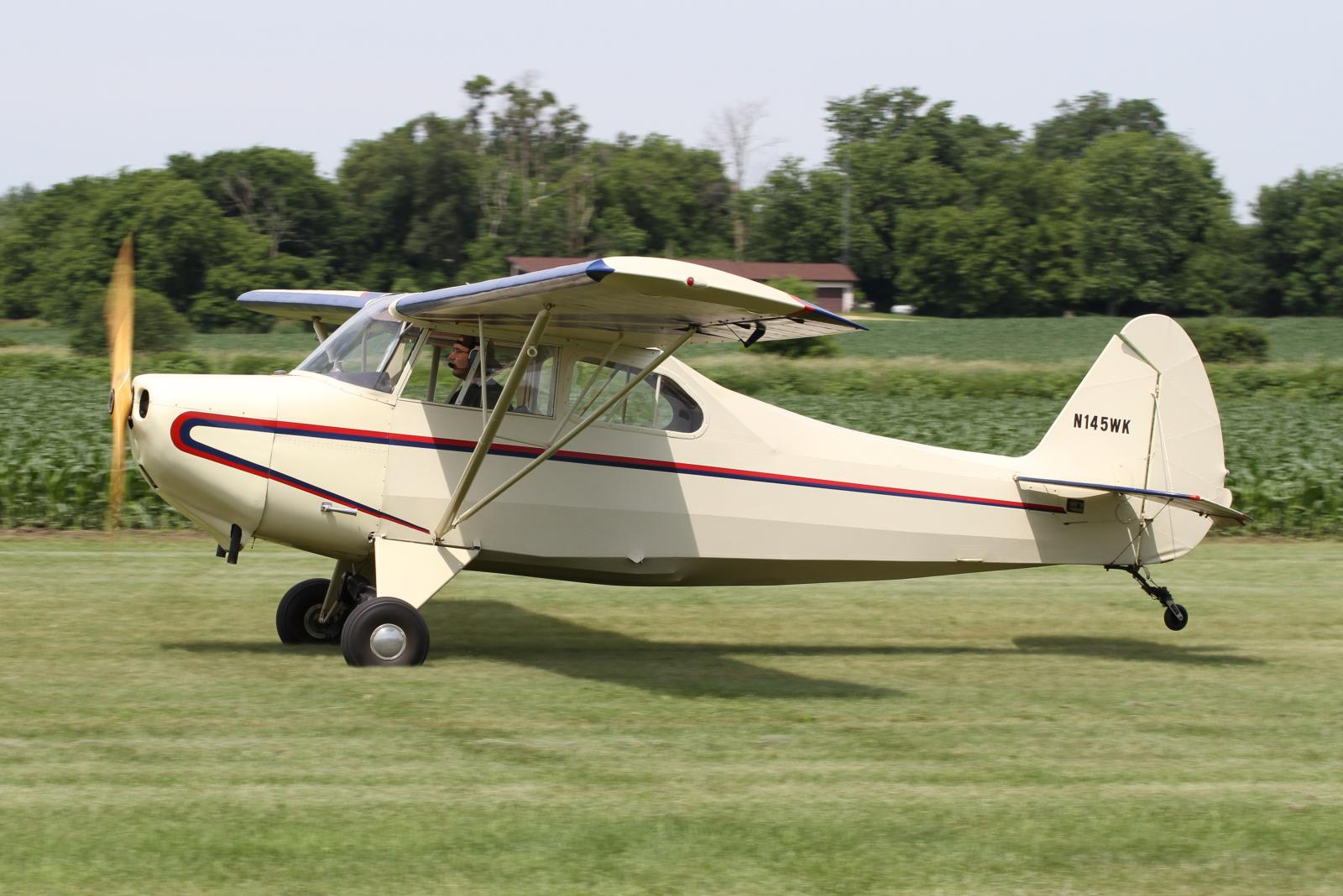
- Christavia Mk I

General information
- Type: Homebuilt aircraft
- National origin: Canada
- Designer: Ron Mason
- Number built: 350 (2002)

History
- Introduction date: 1981
- First flight: 1982
- Variant: Christavia Mk IV

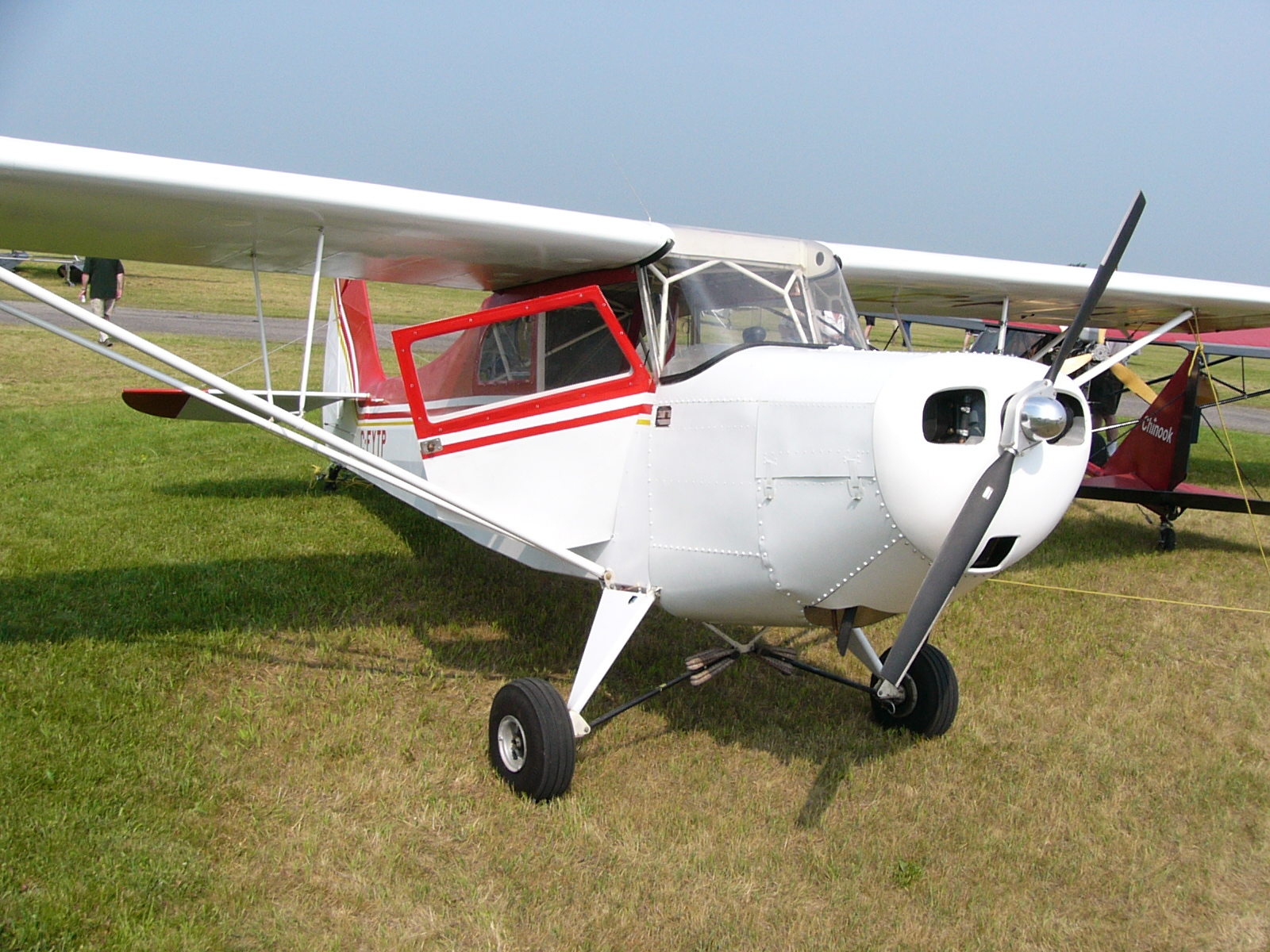
Christavia Mk I

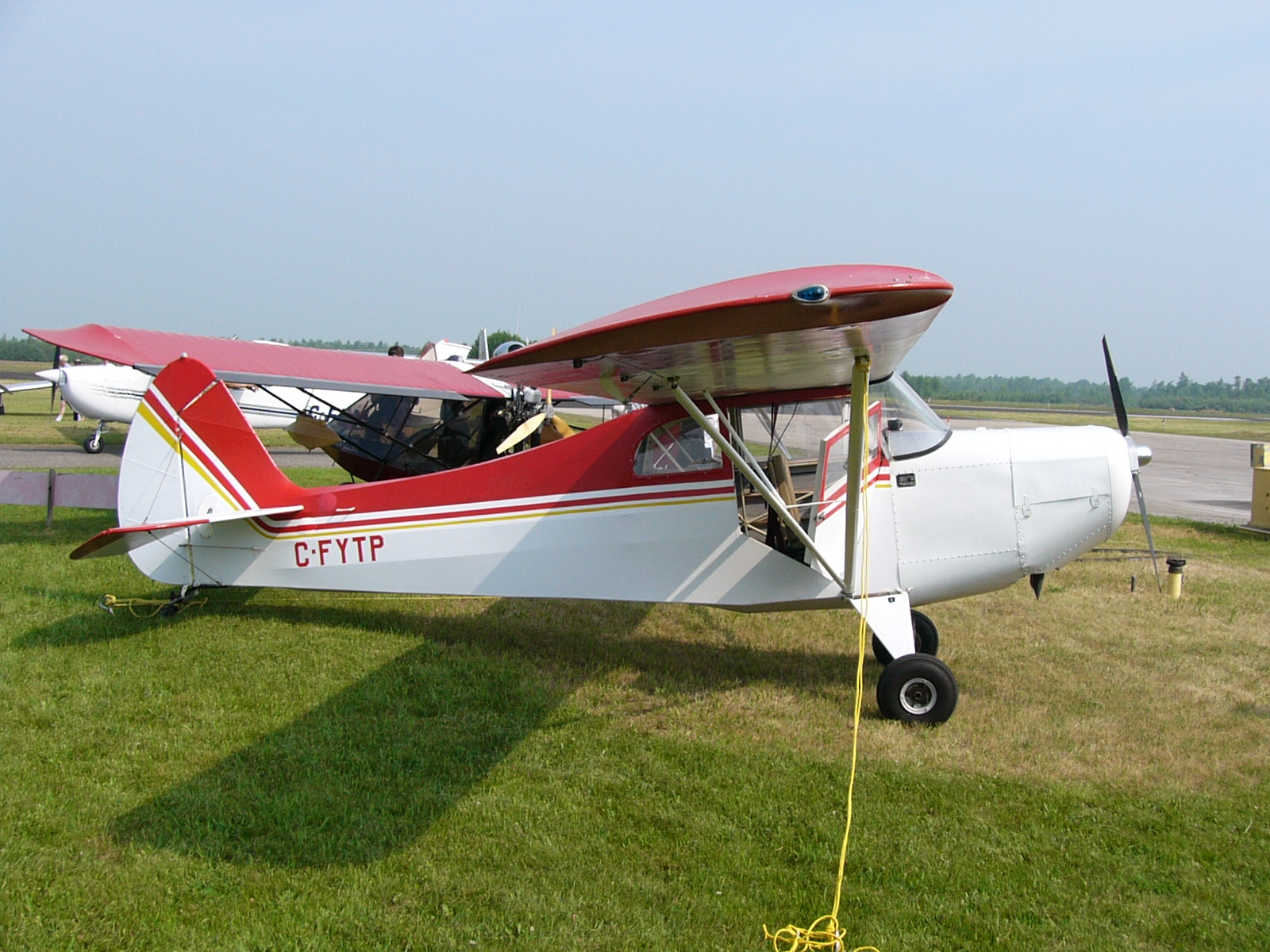
Christavia Mk I

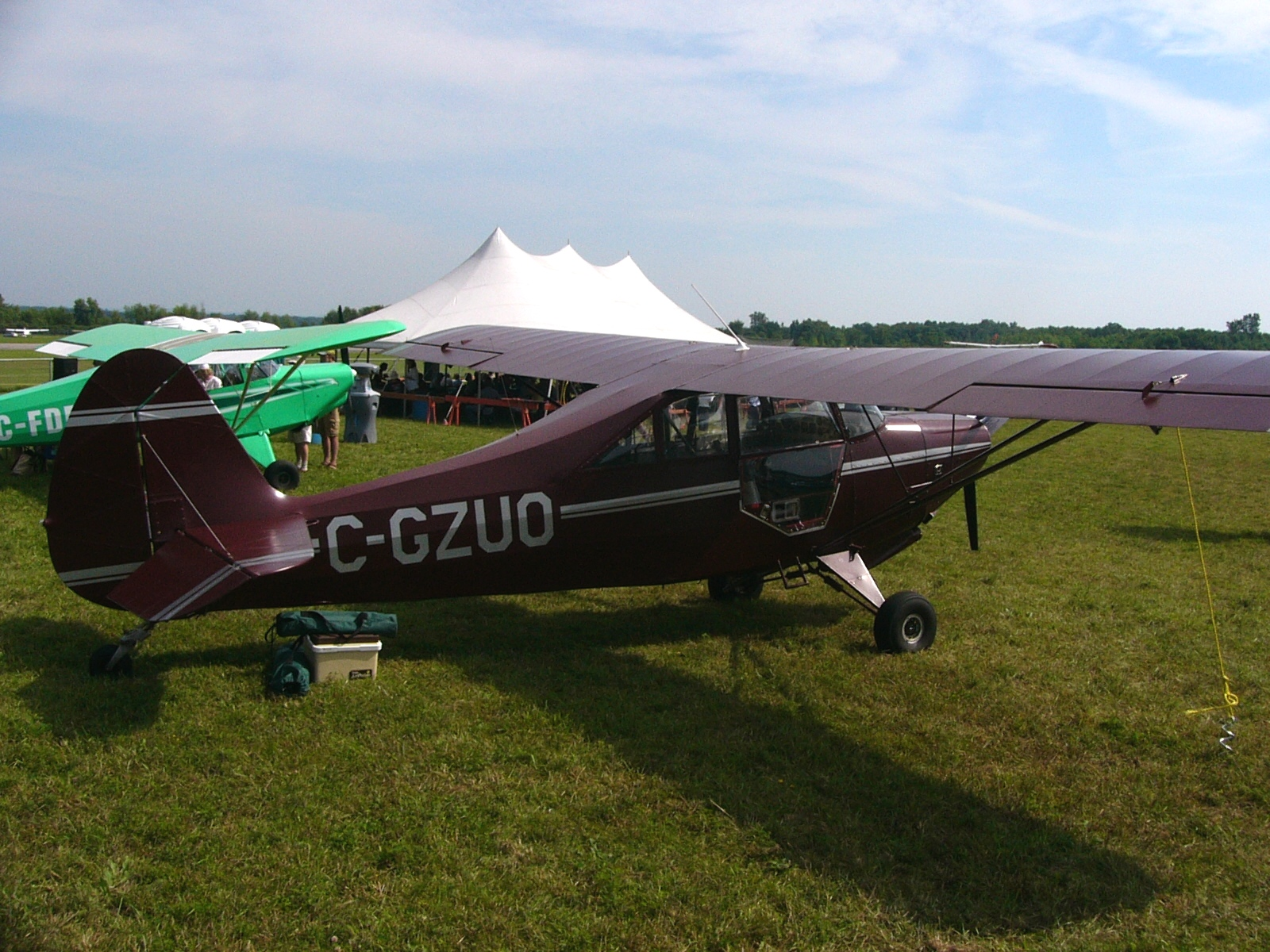
Christavia Mk I

The Christavia Mk I is a Canadian two-seats in tandem homebuilt aircraft designed by Ron Mason. The aircraft is supplied in the form of plans for amateur construction. Designed for missionary flying in Africa, the aircraft's name means "Christ-in-Aviation". The Christavia Mk II is a side-by-side configuration version.

The Christavia Mk I was first completed and registered as a Christavia CA-05 with Transport Canada on October 1, 1981 and first flew in 1982. Over 350 had been completed and flown by 2002.

== Design and development ==
The Christavia is a single engine, high wing, conventional landing gear-equipped aircraft. The fuselage is of 4130 steel tube construction. The wings are flapless, predominantly wooden, use a custom Mason airfoil design and are supported by dual wing struts. The exterior is finished with aircraft fabric covering. The acceptable power range is 65 to 100 hp (48 to 75 kW) and the standard powerplant used is the 65 hp (48 kW) Continental A65 four stroke four cylinder horizontally opposed piston aircraft engine.

Plans are marketed by Aircraft Spruce & Specialty Co. Ron Mason sold the rights to the Christavia series of aircraft to Aircraft Spruce and no longer supplies the plans or support.

The designer estimated the construction time as 2000 hours.

== Operational history ==
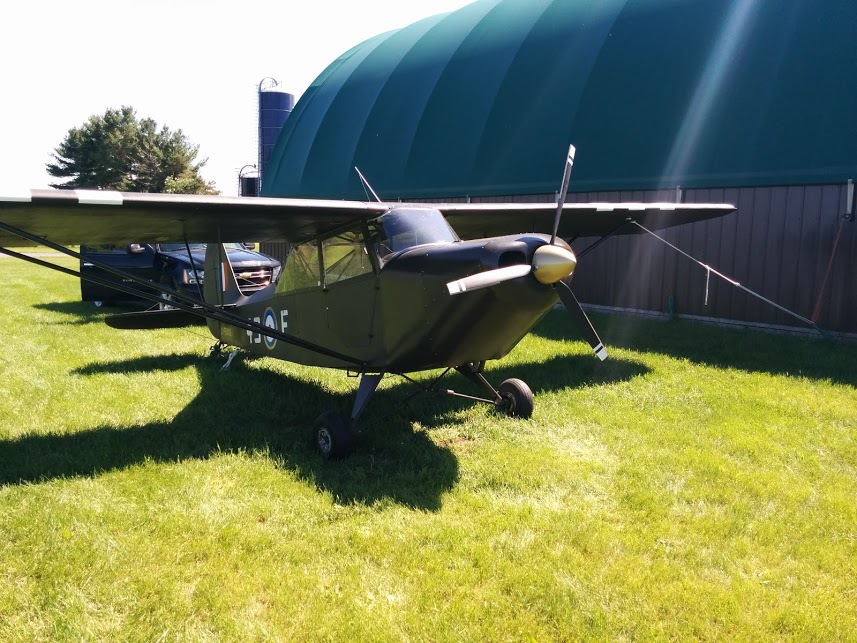
Christavia Mk I

In January 2016 forty-two examples of the Christavia series of aircraft were registered with Transport Canada and sixty-one in the United States with the FAA.

== Variants ==
Christavia Mk I
Two seat seats in tandem model.
Christavia Mk II
Two seat side-by-side model, with otherwise similar specifications to the Mk I.
Christavia Mk IV
Four place model with 150 hp (112 kW) engine recommended.

== Specifications (Christavia Mk I) ==
Data from Original Plans s/n 291

General characteristics

- Crew: one
- Capacity: one passenger
- Length: 20 ft 8 in (6.30 m)
- Wingspan: 32 ft 6 in (9.91 m)
- Height: 7 ft 0 in (2.13 m)
- Wing area: 146.25 sq ft (13.587 m^{2})
- Airfoil: Mason
- Empty weight: 745 lb (338 kg)
- Gross weight: 1,300–1,500 lb (590–680 kg)
- Fuel capacity: 18 US gallons (68 L; 15 imp gal)
- Powerplant: 1 × Continental A-65 horizontally opposed piston aircraft engine, 65 hp (48 kW)
- Propellers: 2-bladed wooden

Performance

- Maximum speed: 120 mph (190 km/h, 100 kn)
- Cruise speed: 105 mph (169 km/h, 91 kn)
- Stall speed: 40 mph (64 km/h, 35 kn)
- Range: 350 mi (560 km, 300 nmi)
- Service ceiling: 15,000 ft (4,600 m)
- Rate of climb: 1,000 ft/min (5.1 m/s)

== See also ==
Aircraft of comparable role, configuration, and era

- Aeronca Champion
- Wag-Aero CUBy
