= Clark Y airfoil =

Airfoil design

Clark Y is the name of a particular airfoil profile, widely used in general purpose aircraft designs, and much studied in aerodynamics over the years. The profile was designed in 1922 by Virginius E. Clark using thickness distribution of the German-developed Goettingen 398 airfoil. The airfoil has a thickness of 11.7 percent and is flat on the lower surface aft of 30 percent of chord. The flat bottom simplifies angle measurements on propellers, and makes for easy construction of wings.

For many applications the Clark Y has been an adequate airfoil section; it gives reasonable overall performance in respect of its lift-to-drag ratio, and has gentle and relatively benign stall characteristics. The flat lower surface is not optimal from an aerodynamic perspective, and it is rarely used in modern designs.

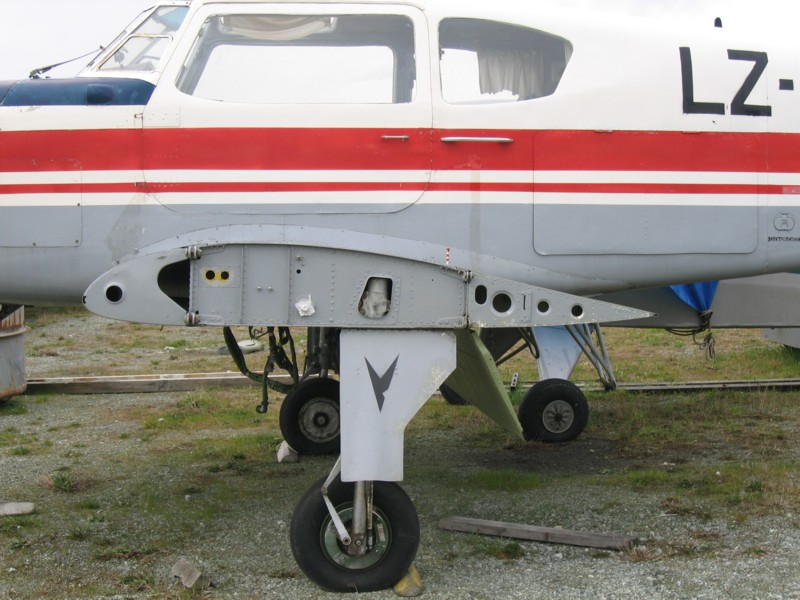
Clark YH wingroot of a Yak-18T

The Clark YH airfoil is similar but with a reflexed (turned up) trailing edge producing a more positive pitching moment reducing the horizontal tail load required to trim an aircraft.

== Applications ==
=== Aircraft ===
The Lockheed Vega and Spirit of St. Louis are two of the better known aircraft using the Clark Y profile, while the Ilyushin Il-2 and Hawker Hurricane are examples of mass-produced users of the Clark YH.

The Northrop Tacit Blue stealth technology demonstrator aircraft also used a Clark Y. The Clark Y was chosen as its flat bottom worked well with the design goal of a low radar cross-section.

=== Model aircraft ===
The Clark Y has found favor for the construction of model aircraft, thanks to the flight performance that the section offers at medium Reynolds number airflows. Applications range from free-flight gliders through to multi-engined radio control scale models.

The Clark Y is appealing for its near-flat lower surface, which aids in the construction of wings on plans mounted on a flat construction board. Inexperienced modellers are more readily able to build model aircraft which provide a good flight performance with benign stalling characteristics.

=== Cars ===
An inverted Clark Y airfoil was used on the spoilers of the Dodge Charger Daytona and Plymouth Superbird.

== Aircraft ==
Some of the better-known aircraft that use the Clark Y and YH:

Clark Y

- Aeronca 50 Chief
- Avia B.122
- Consolidated PT-1 to Fleet Fawn (all intermediate designs used the same section)
- Curtiss P-6 Hawk (most of the Curtiss Hawks used the same section)
- Heath Parasol
- Lockheed Vega to Orion (all intermediate designs used the same section)
- Polikarpov R-5
- Ryan Brougham and related types including the Spirit of St. Louis
- Stinson Reliant
- Vultee V-11
- Waco Standard and Custom Cabin series

Clark YH

- Currie Wot
- Hawker Hurricane
- Ilyushin Il-2 and Il-10
- Mikoyan-Gurevich MiG-1 and MiG-3
- Miles Magister
- Nanchang CJ-6
- Polikarpov I-153
- Potez 39
- Stolp SA-900 V-Star
- Yakovlev Yak-1, 3 and 9
- Yakovlev Yak-50
