= List of aerobatic aircraft =

An aerobatic aircraft is an aerodyne (a heavier-than-air aircraft) used in aerobatics; for flight exhibitions, military and civilian display teams, and aerobatic competitions.

Most aerobatic aircraft fall into one of two categories: standard aircraft used for training and by flight demonstration teams, which are often standard trainers or fighters; and single-purpose aircraft especially designed for aerobatics, usually at the expense of other attributes, such as stability, carrying passengers or endurance. Dates listed are of the types' maiden flight.

== Powered aircraft ==
=== Australia ===
- Victa/AESL Airtourer (1959)
- MX Aircraft MX2 (2002)
- MX Aircraft MXS (20yy)

=== Belgium ===
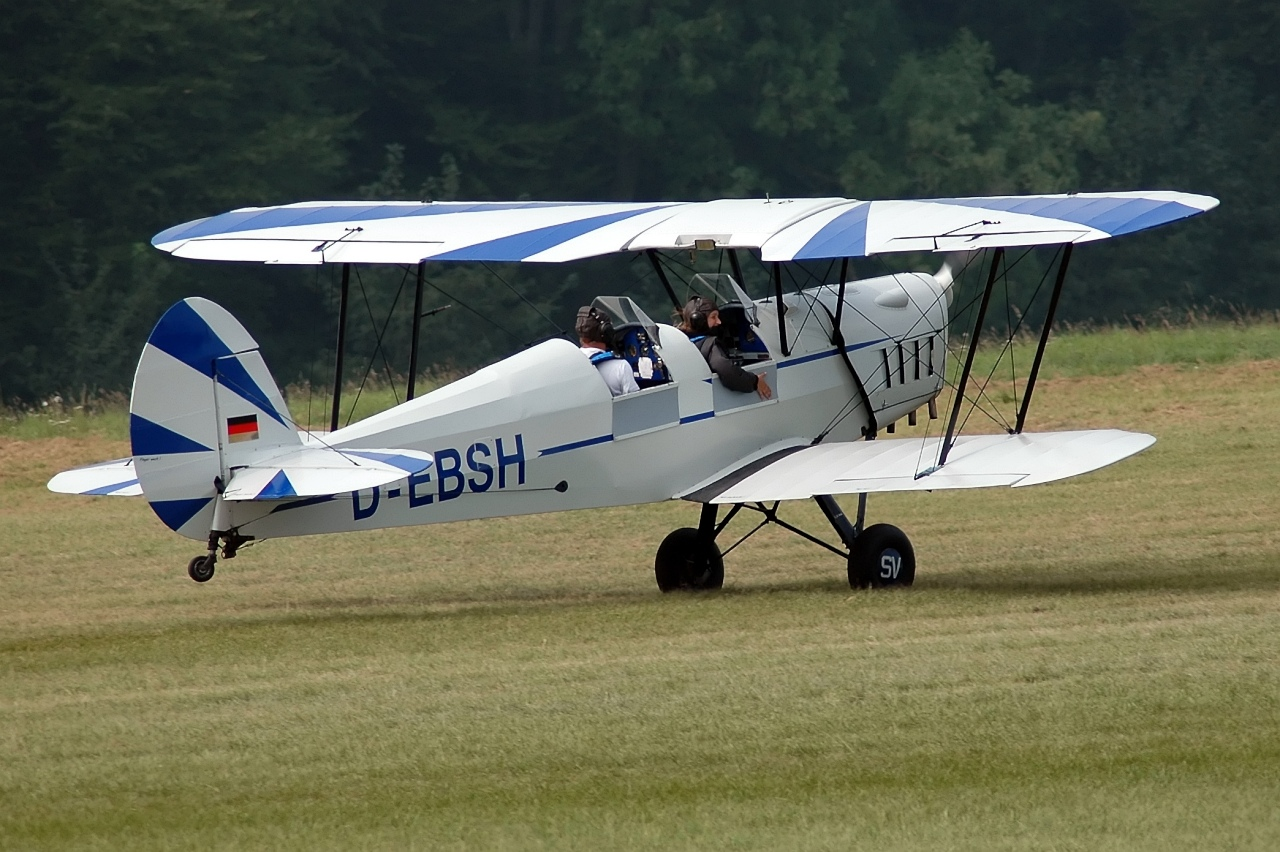
Stampe-Vertongen SV-4.

- Renard R.34 (1934)
- Stampe SV.4 (1933)
- Tipsy Nipper (homebuilt, 1957)

=== Brazil ===
- ACS-100 Sora (2008)
- CEA-309 Mehari (2009)
- Embraer EMB 312 Tucano (operated by the Esquadrilha da Fumaça) (1980)
- Embraer EMB 314 Super Tucano (operated by the Esquadrilha da Fumaça) (2012)
- Instituto de Pesquisas Tecnologicas IPT-16 Surubim (1959)
- Neiva Universal (operated by the Esquadrilha da Fumaça) (1966)
- Wega 180 (2013)

=== Canada ===
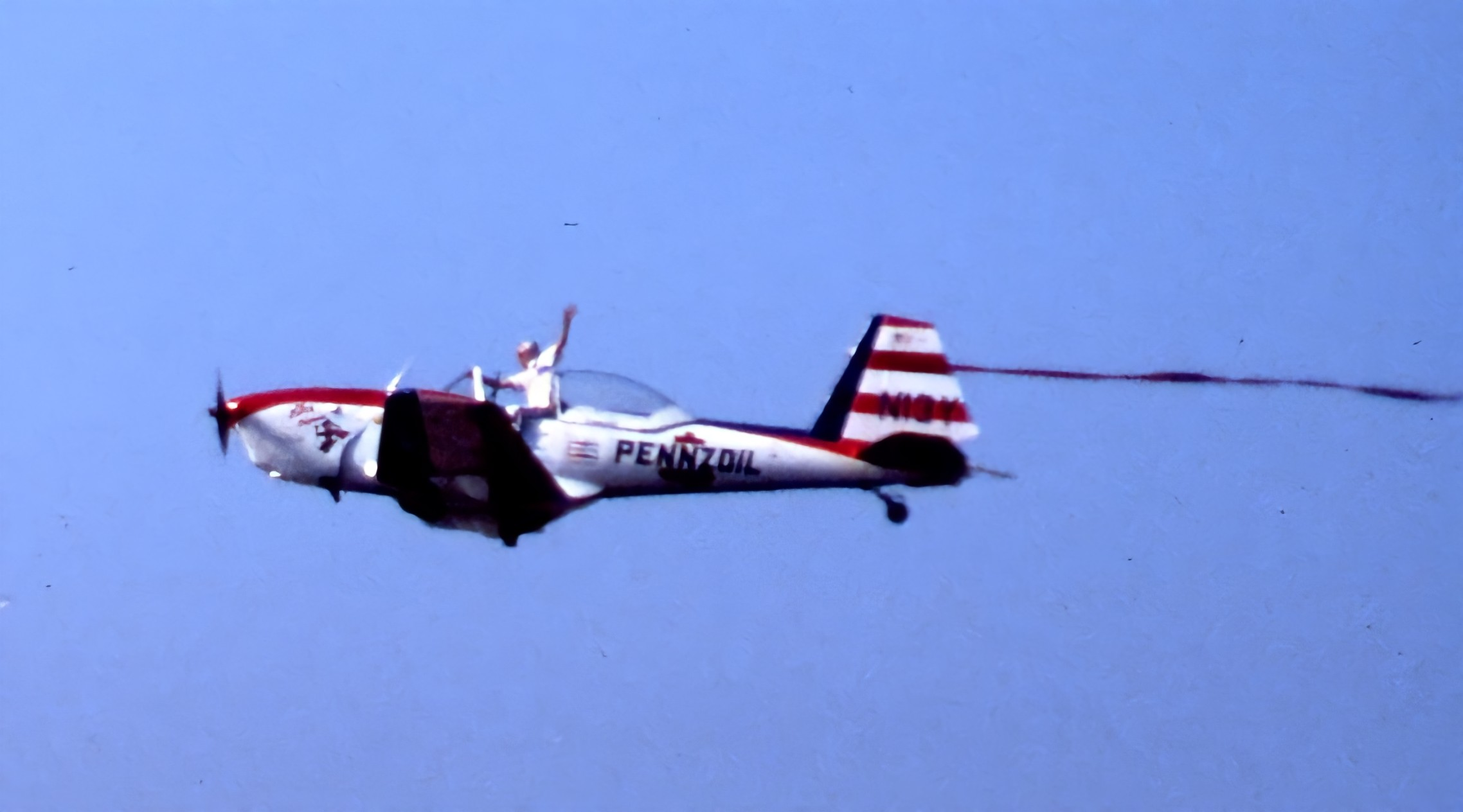
Super Chipmunk - an extensively modified de Havilland Canada DHC-1 Chipmunk.

- Acrolite Aircraft Acrolite (homebuilt, 1986)
- Canadair Sabre (fighter, operated by the Golden Hawks) (1950)
- Canadair CT-114 Tutor (operated by the Snowbirds) (1960)
- Canadair CT-133 Silver Star (operated by the Red Knight) (1952)
- de Havilland Canada DHC-1 Chipmunk (1946)
- Raven 2XS (homebuilt, 2009)
- Ultimate Aircraft 10 Dash (1985)
- Ultimate 10-180 (1990s homebuilt)
- Ultimate 10-200 (1990s homebuilt)
- Ultimate 10-300 (1990s homebuilt biplane)
- Zenith CH 150 Acro Zenith (homebuilt, 1980)

=== Chile ===
- ENAER T-35 Pillán (1981)

=== China ===
- Chengdu J-7 (flown by the August 1st) (1966)
- Chengdu J-10 (flown by the August 1st) (1998)
- Hongdu JL-8 (1990)
- Nanchang CJ-6 (1958)
- Shenyang J-5 (flown by the August 1st) (1956)

=== Czechoslovakia / Czech Republic ===
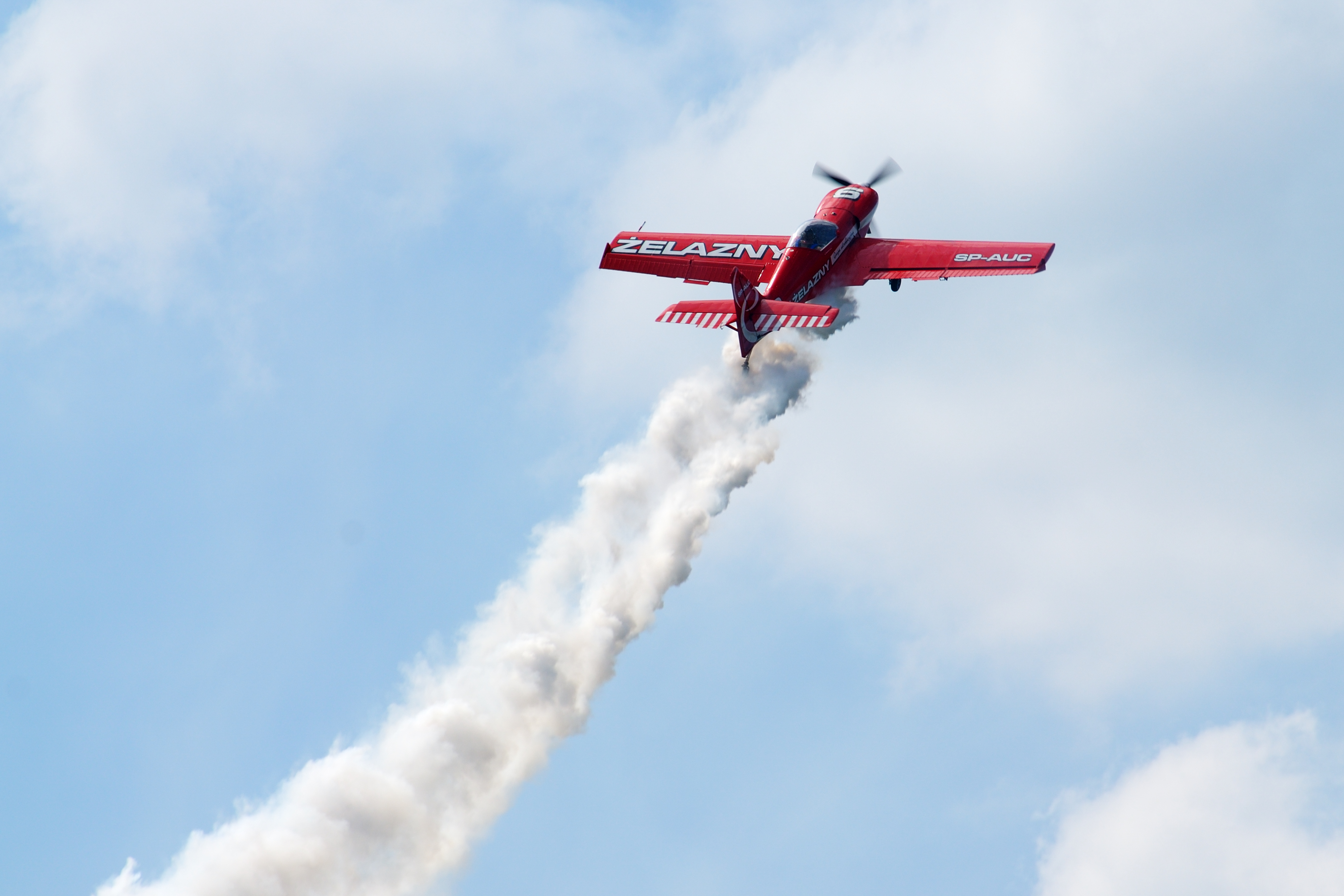
Zlin Z-50 trailing smoke.

- Aero L-29A Akrobat (1959)
- Aero L-39 Albatros (operated by the Patriots Jet Team) (1968)
- Avia BH-10 (1924)
- Avia BH-21 (1925)
- Avia BH-22 (1925)
- Avia B.122 (1934)
- Beneš-Mráz Beta-Scolar (1937)
- Zlín Akrobat
- Zlín Trener Master
- Zlín Z 26 (1947)
- Zlín Z-226
- Zlín Z-326
- Zlín Z-526
- Zlín Z-50 (1975)
- Zlín Z-242L

=== Denmark ===
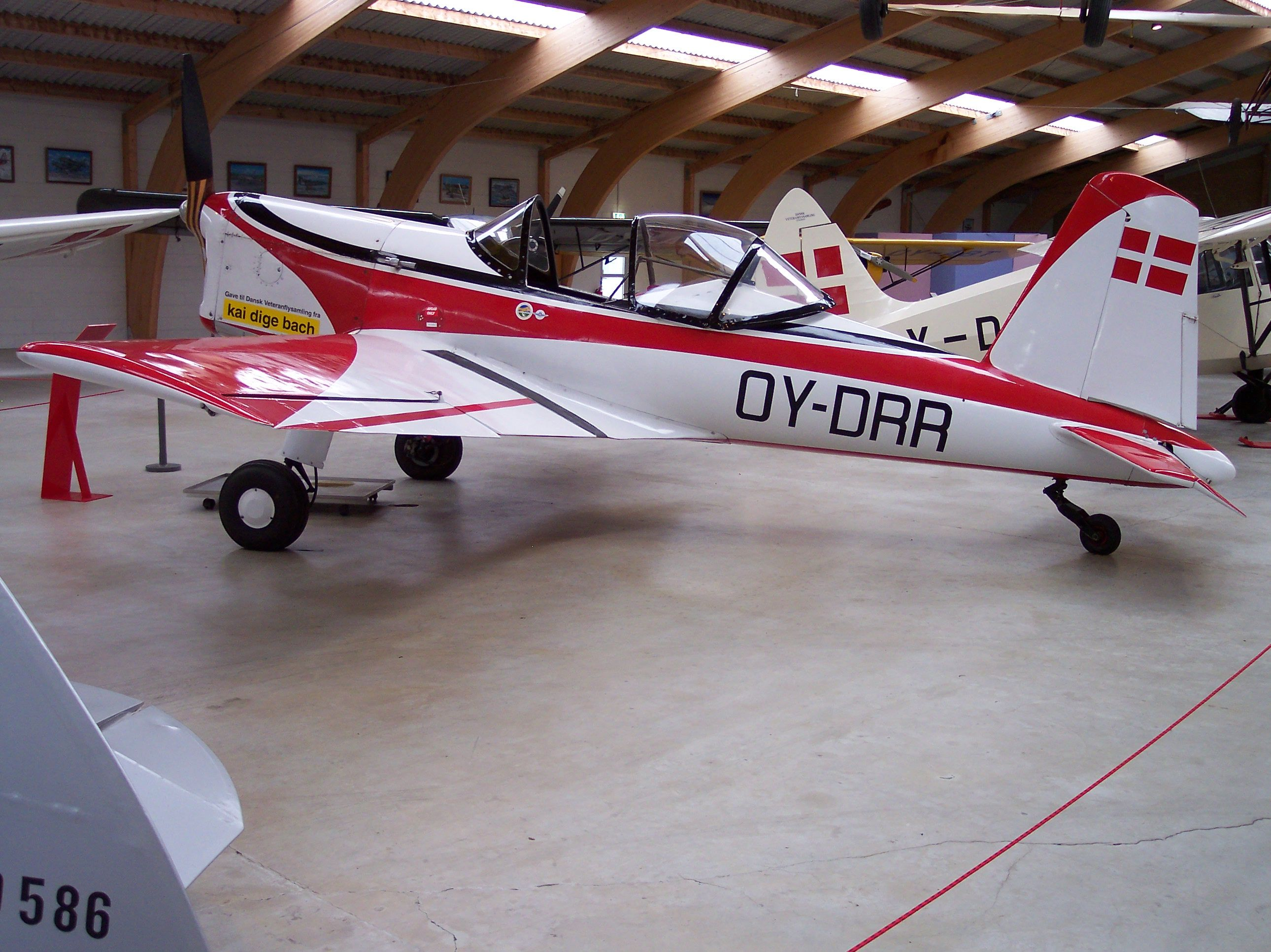
SAI KZ VIII in museum.

- SAI KZ II Sport (1937)
- SAI KZ VIII (1949)

=== France ===
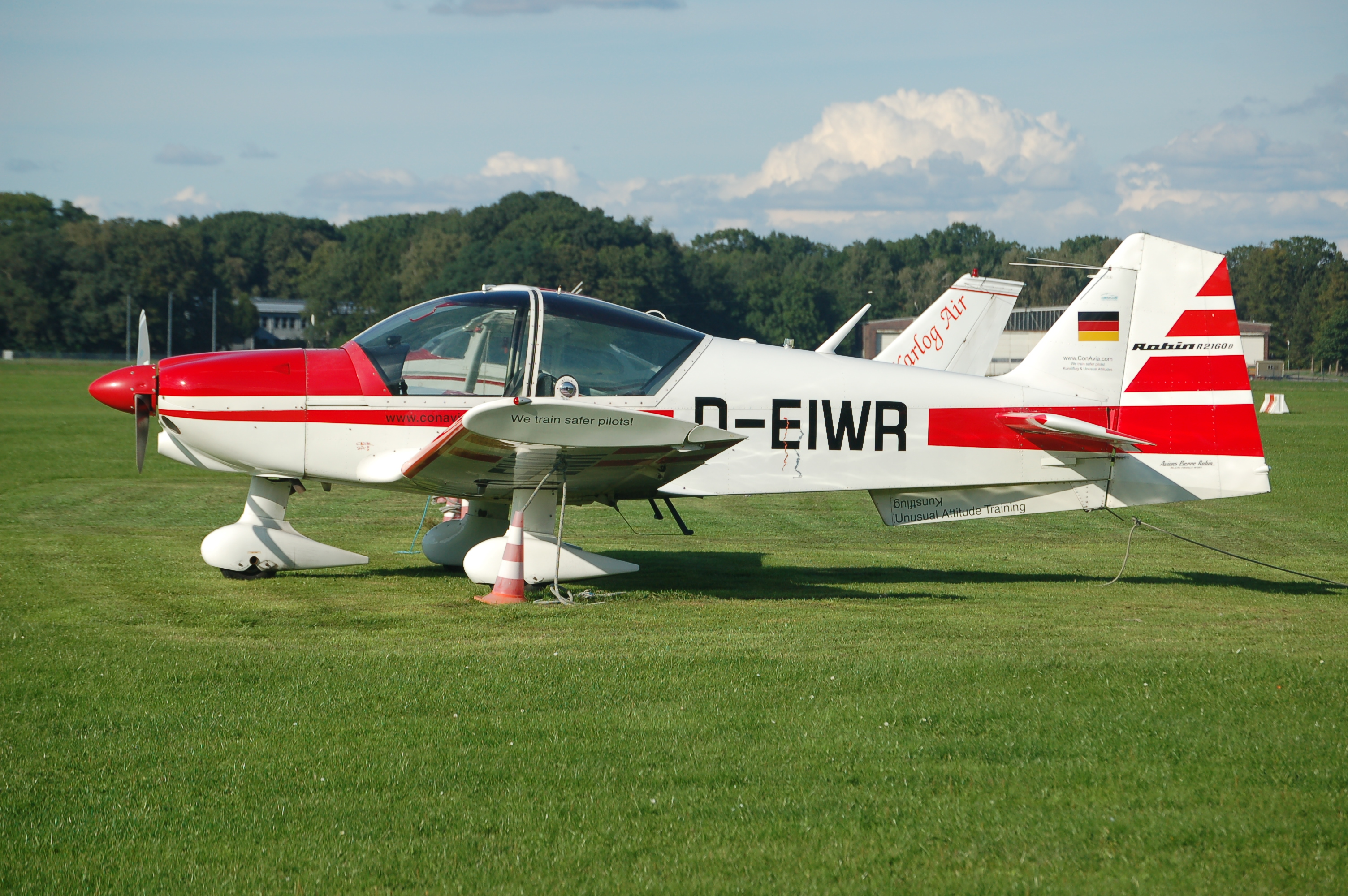
Robin R.2160D (D-EIWR) 03.

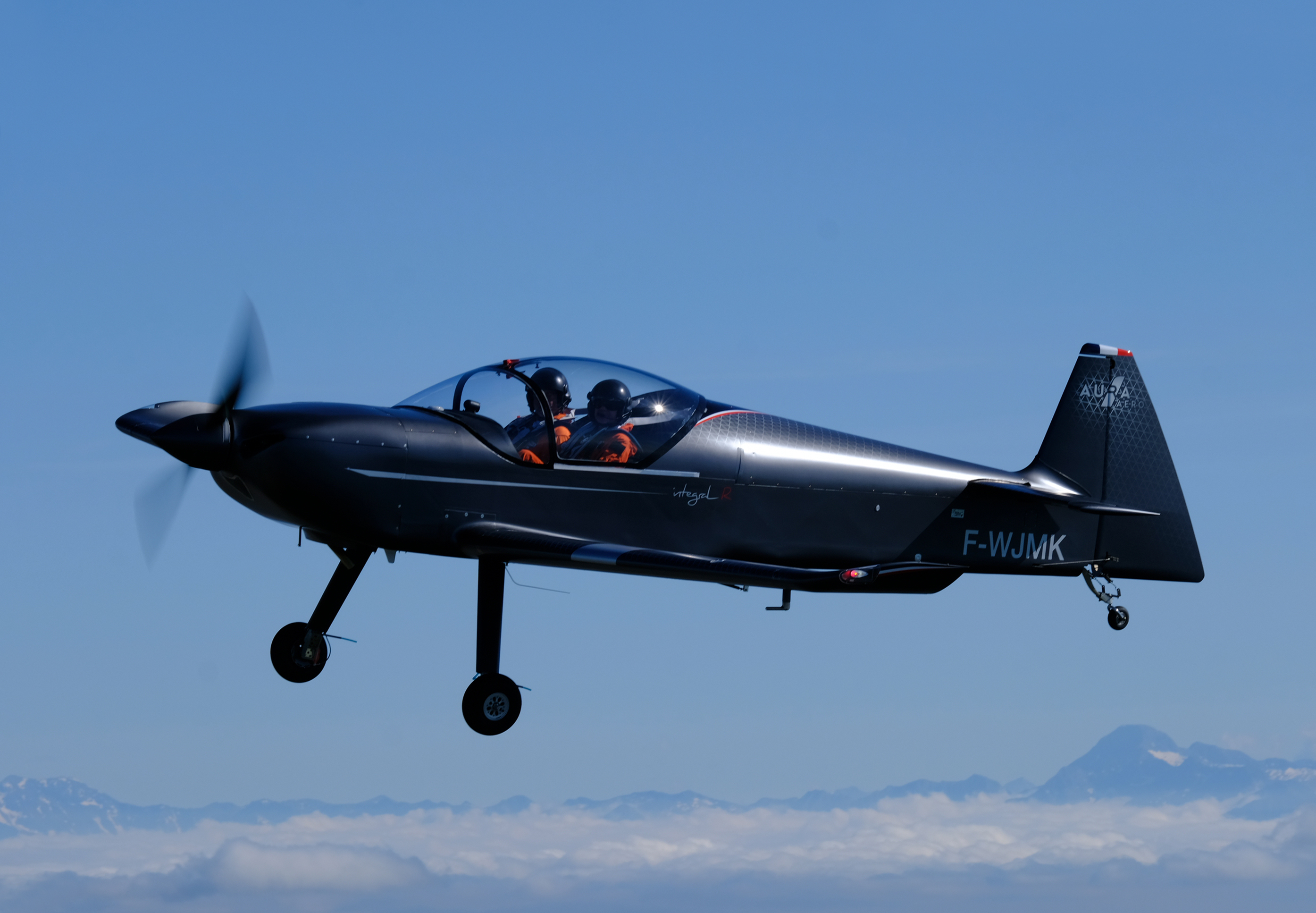
Integral R.

- Acrobin (= Avions Robin R2160) (1976)
- Aura Aero Integral R
- Bernard S-72 (operated by Antoine Paillard, 1930)
- Blériot XI (first loop in Western Europe in 1913) (1909)
- Dewoitine D.27 (operated by Marcel Doret) (1928)
- Dyn'Aéro CR.100 (homebuilt, 1992)
- Dyn'Aéro R180 (homebuilt)
- Fouga CM.170 Magister (operated by the IAF Aerobatic Team) (1952)
- Fouga CM.175 Zéphyr (1959)
- Fournier RF 4 (1966)
- Gazuit-Valladeau GV-1020 (1969)

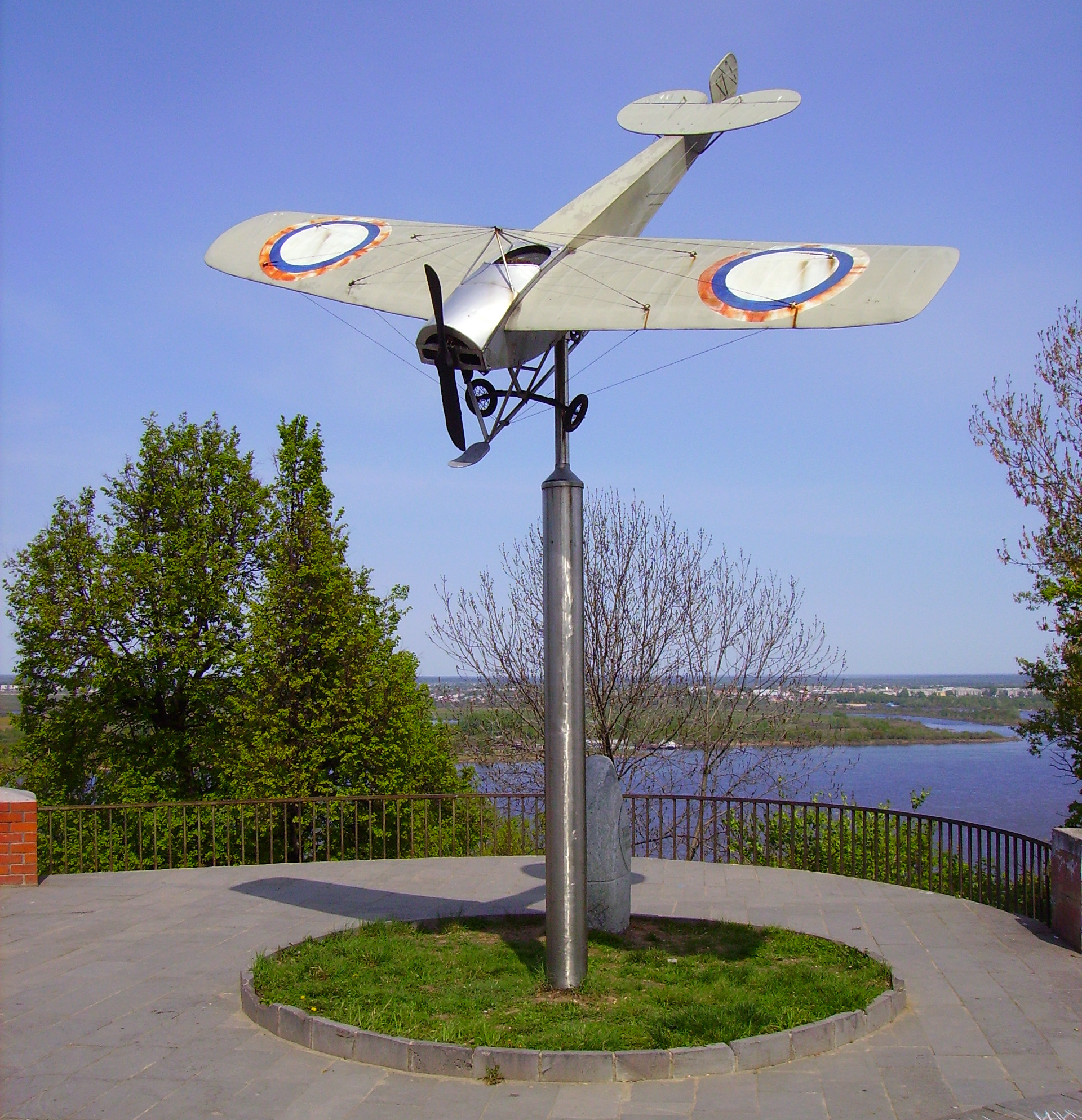
Monument of Nieuport IV.G built to commemorate first loop.

- Gourdou-Leseurre GL B6 & B7 (1918)
- Morane-Saulnier G (1912)
- Morane-Saulnier MS.180 (1929)
- Morane-Saulnier M.S.225 (1932)
- Morane-Saulnier MS.230 (operated by the Patrouille d'Étampes) (1929)
- Morane-Saulnier MS.560 (1945)
- Mudry CAP 10 (1968)
- Mudry CAP 20 (1976)
- Mudry CAP 21 (1979)
- Mudry CAP 222
- Mudry CAP 230 (1997)
- Nieuport IV.G (first loop) (1911)
- Nord 3202B1B (1957)
- Peña Bilouis (homebuilt, 1991)
- Peña Capeña (homebuilt, 1984)
- Peña Dahu (homebuilt, 1996)
- Peña Joker (homebuilt, 2002)
- Piel Pinocchio II (homebuilt, 1986)
- Romano R.82 (1936)
- Scintex Super Emeraude (homebuilt, 1954)
- Tech Aero TR 200 (homebuilt, 1988)

=== France & Germany ===
- Dassault/Dornier Alpha Jet (operated by the Patrouille de France) (1973)

=== Germany ===
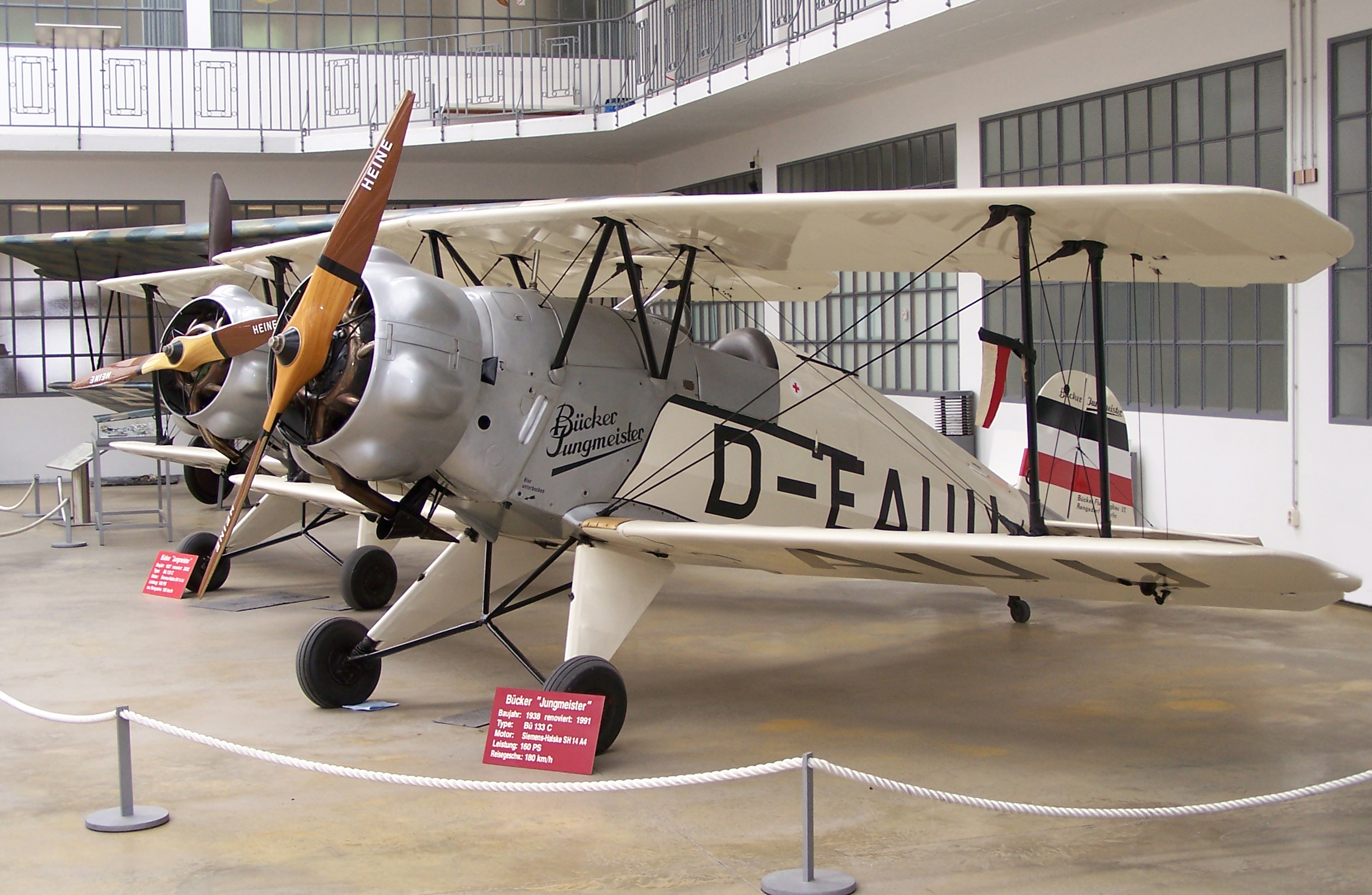
Restored Bücker Bü 133 Jungmeister.

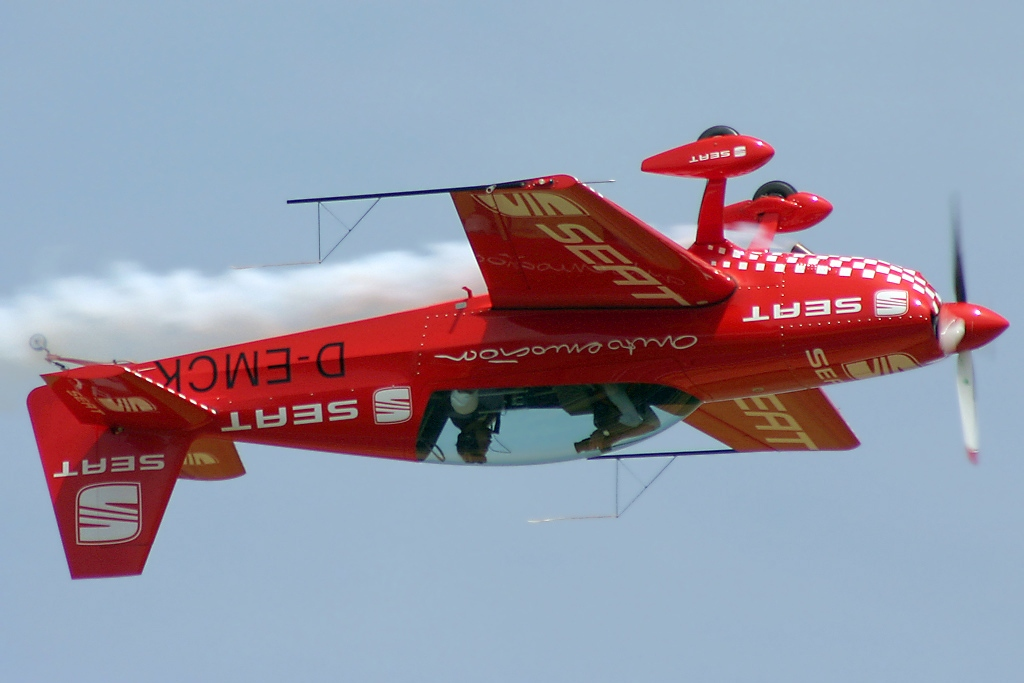
Extra 300L flying inverted.

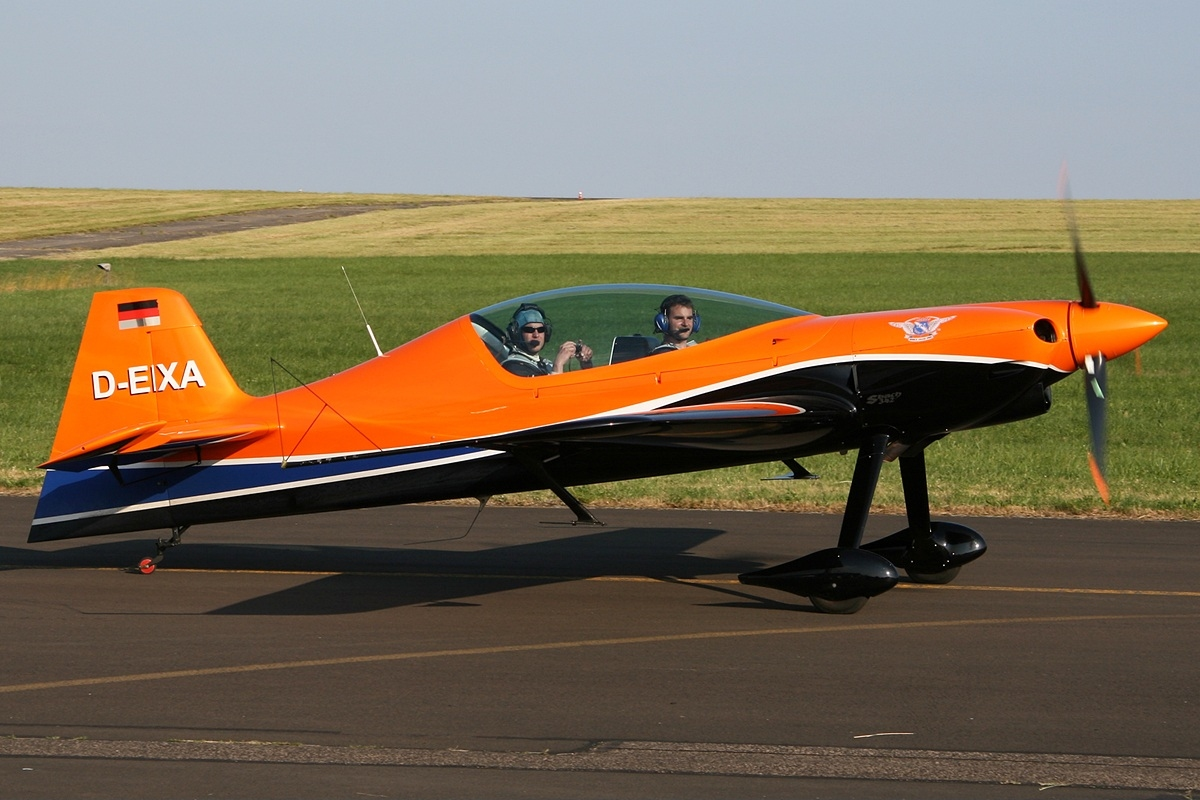
Sbach Xtremeair 342 Private D-EIXA, BBJ Bitburg (Bitburg Air Base), Germany.

- Akaflieg München Mü30 Schlacro (2000)
- Albatros L 79 Kobold (1929)
- Arado Ar 79 (1938)
- BFW M.35 (1933)
- Bücker Bü 131 (1934)
- Bücker Bü 133 (flown by Alexandru Papană) (1935)
- Dietrich DP.II (1923?)
- Extra EA-200 (1996)
- Extra EA-230 (1983)
- Extra EA-300 (operated by the Royal Jordanian Falcons) (1988)
- Fieseler F2 Tiger (1932)
- Fieseler Fi 5 (1933)
- Focke-Wulf S 24 (1928)
- Focke-Wulf Fw 44 (1932)
- Grob G 115 (19??)
- Grob G 120 (1999)
- Hirth Acrostar (1970)
- Junkers Profly Ultima (1993)
- Klemm Kl 35 (1935)
- MBB 223K-1 Flamingo
- Mylius My-103 Mistral (1998)
- Raab-Katzenstein RK-26 (flown by Gerhard Fieseler) (1929)
- Udet U 12 Flamingo (flown by Ernst Udet) (1925)
- XtremeAir Sbach 300
- XtremeAir Sbach 342

=== Hungary ===
- Corvus Racer 540 (2010)
- Genevation GenPro (2018)

=== India ===
- Hunter (1982)
- Kiran MkII (1996)
- Advanced Light Helicopter (ALH)

=== Italy ===
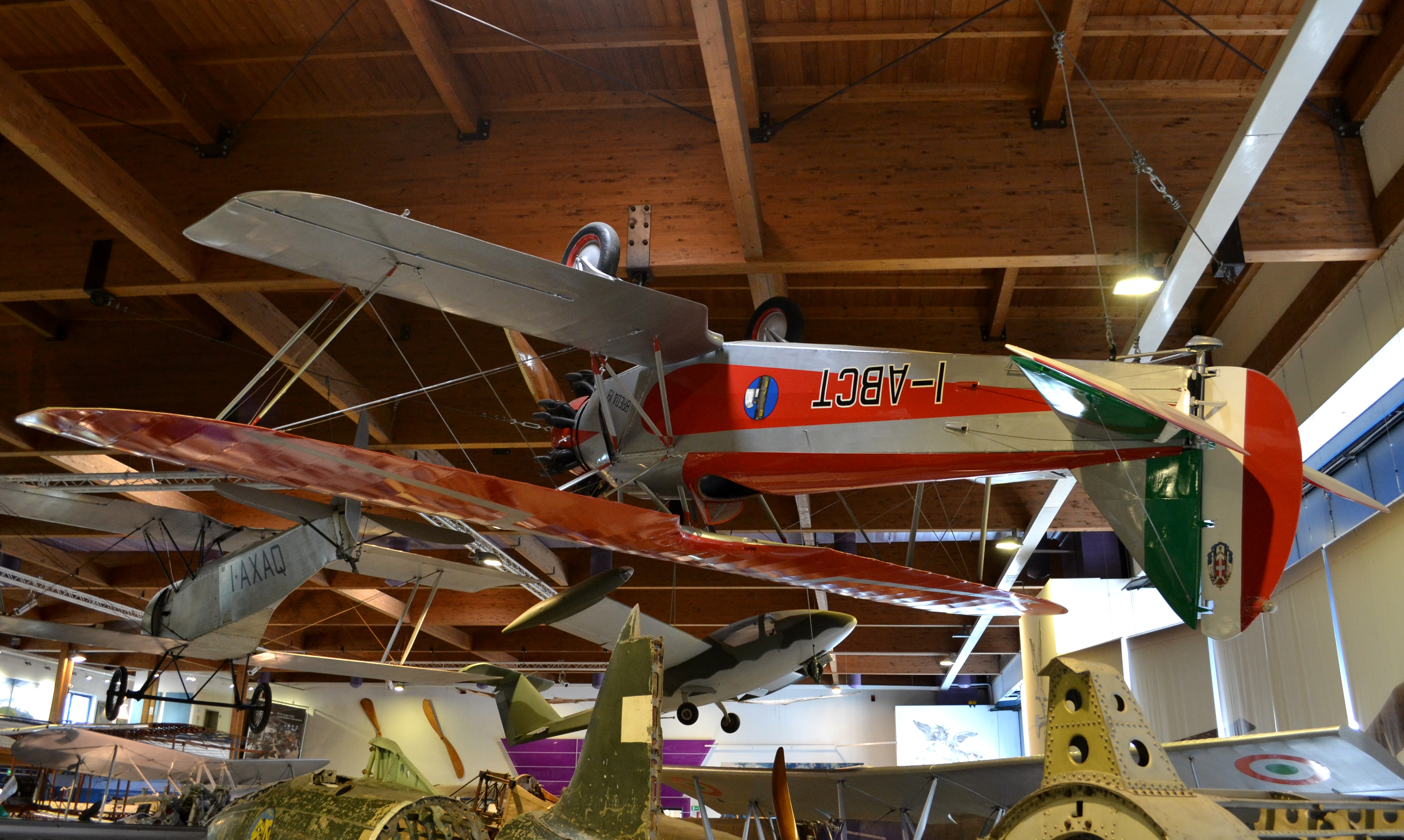
Breda Ba.19 inverted in museum.

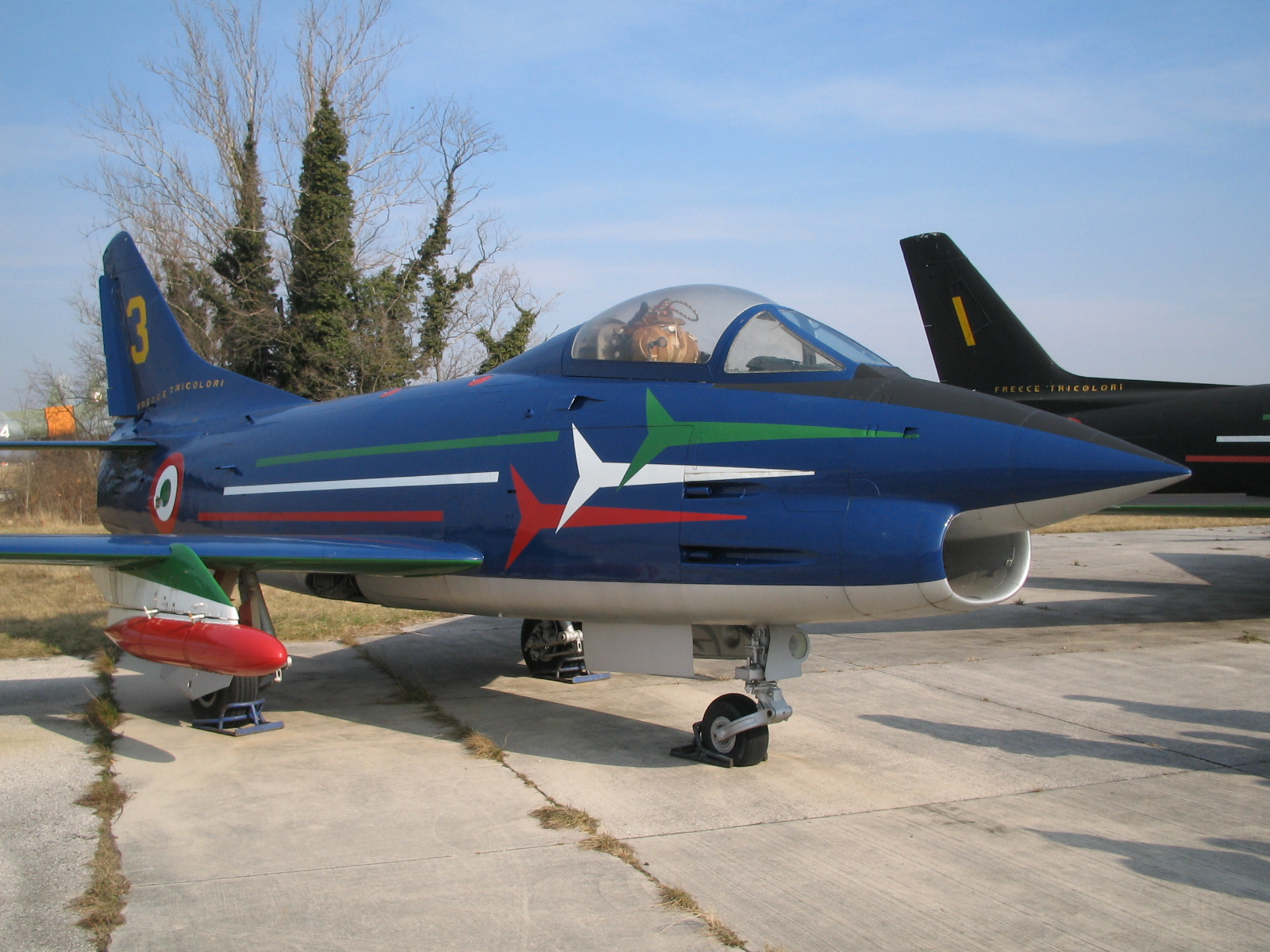
Frecce Tricolori Fiat G.91.

- Aermacchi SF.260 (operated by the Belgian Diables Rouges) (1964)
- Aermacchi MB-326 (operated by the Silver Falcons & the Roulettes) (1957)
- Aermacchi MB-339 (operated by the Frecce Tricolori) (1976)
- Breda Ba.19 (operated by the Squadriglia di Alta Acrobazia Aerea) (1928)
- CANSA C.5 (1939)
- CANSA C.6 (1941)
- Caproni Ca.113 (1931)
- Fiat CR.32 (flown by the Pattuglie Acrobatiche) (1933)
- General Avia F.22 (1992)
- IMAM Ro.26 (or Romeo Ro.26) (1932)
- Magni Vale (1937)
- New Avio C205 ultra-light operated by Walter's Bad
- Partenavia Alpha (1972)
- Piaggio P.148 (1951)
- Sequoia Falco (homebuilt - 1955)
- Sivel SD28 (1995)
- Terzi T30 Katana (homebuilt - 1991)

=== Japan ===
- Mitsubishi T-2 (1980) - Blue Impulse
- Kawasaki T-4 (1995) - Blue Impulse
- Fuji FA-200 Aero Subaru

=== New Zealand ===
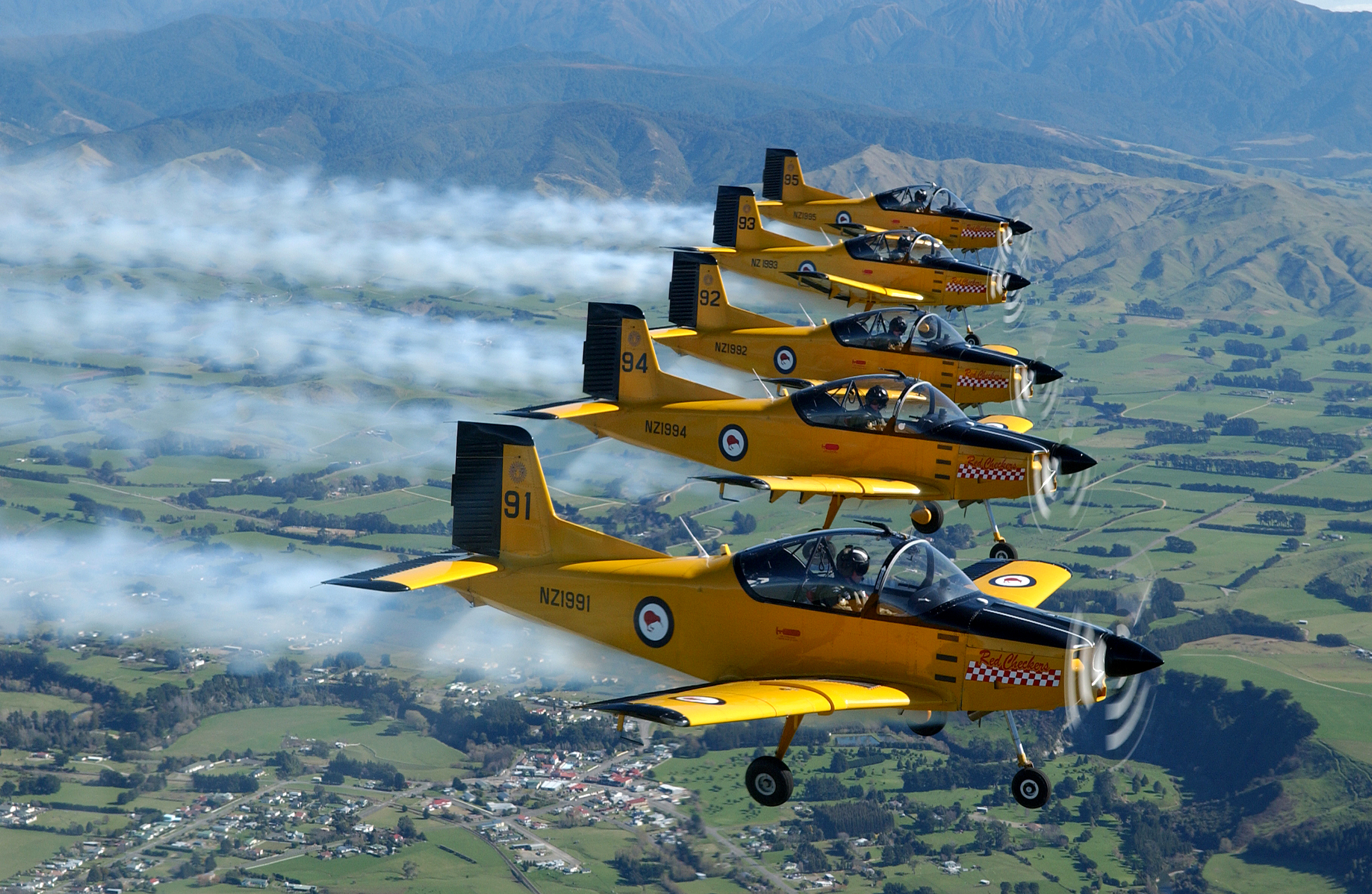
CT/4 Airtrainers of the Red Checkers en echelon.

- PAC CT/4 Airtrainer (operated by the RNZAF Red Checkers team) (1972)

=== Pakistan ===
- PAC MFI-17 Mushshak (1981)

=== Poland ===
- PWS-11 (1929)
- PWS-35 Ogar (1938)
- PZL TS-11 Iskra (1960)
- PZL-130 Orlik (1984)
- RWD 10 (1933)
- RWD 17 (1937)

=== Romania ===
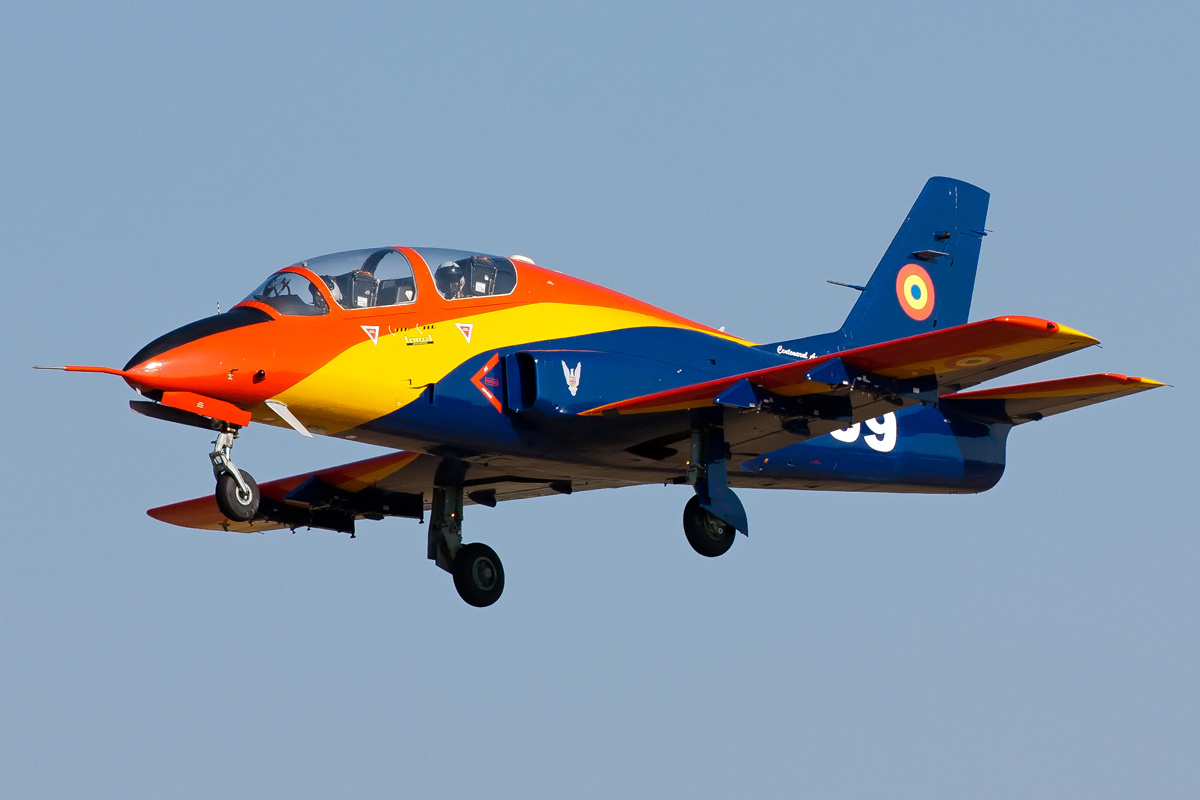
IAR 99 Șoim.

- IAR 99 Șoim (1985)
- Yakovlev Yak-52 (Iak-52, 1977, Aerostar Bacau)

=== Russia / Soviet Union ===
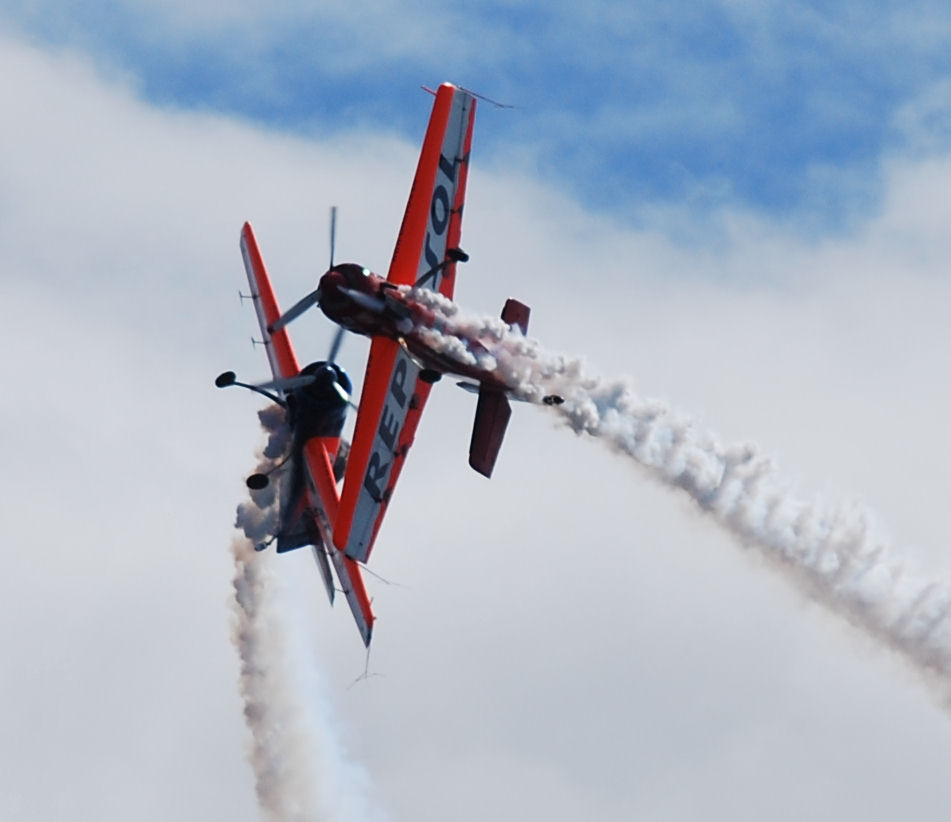
Two Sukhoi Su-26s doing a crossover manoeuvre.

- Aviatika-900 Acrobat (1993)
- Aeropract-Samara A-41 (2016)
- Mikoyan MiG-29 (1977)
- MAI Kvant (1967)
- Nikitin NV-6 (1940)
- Sukhoi Su-26 (1988) single-seater
- Sukhoi Su-27 (1977)
- Sukhoi Su-29 (1991)
- Sukhoi Su-31 (1992)
- Technoavia SP-91 Slava
- Technoavia SP-95
- Yakovlev UT-1 (1936)
- Yakovlev Yak-11 (1946)
- Yakovlev Yak-18 (1946)
- Yakovlev Yak-20 (1949)
- Yakovlev Yak-50 (1975)
- Yakovlev Yak-52 (1976)
- Yakovlev Yak-53 (1982)
- Yakovlev Yak-55 (1981)
- Yakovlev Yak-54 (1993)

=== South Africa ===
- Slick Aircraft Slick 360 (2004)

=== South Korea ===
- T-50B Black Eagles (2009)

=== Spain ===
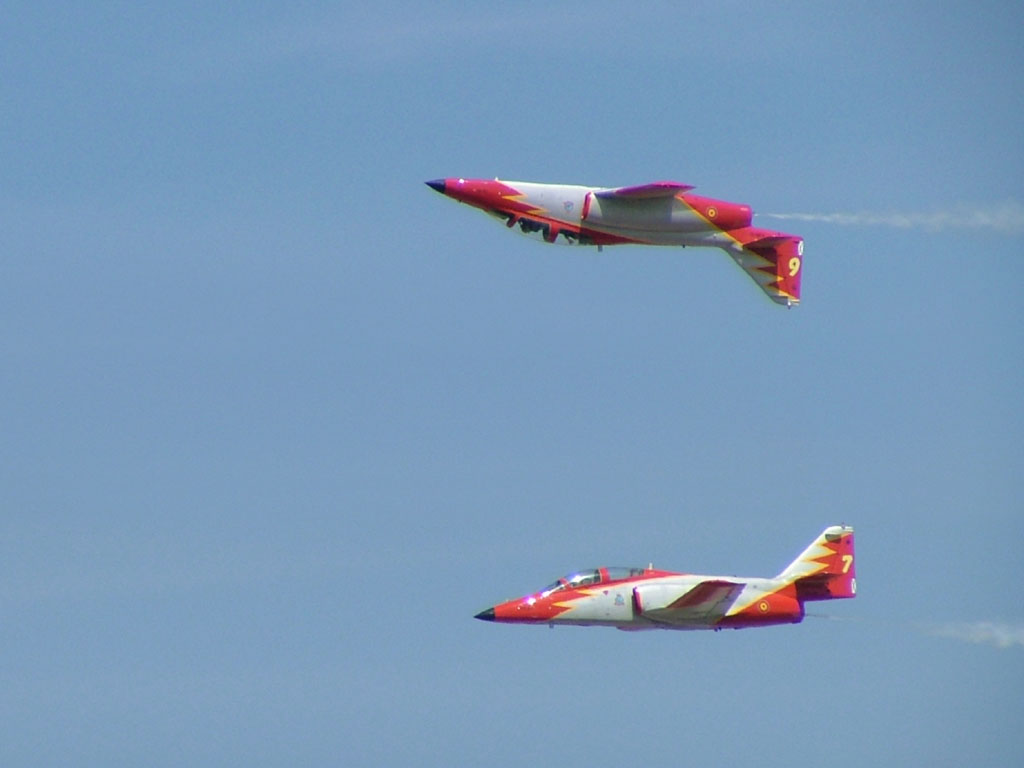
Patrulla Águila CASA C-101 flying canopy to canopy.

- CASA C-101 Aviojet (1977)

=== Sweden ===
- Andreasson BA-4B (homebuilt, 1966)
- Saab 105 (operated by Team 60) (1963)

=== Switzerland ===
- Pilatus P-3 (operated by the P3 Flyers) (1996)
- Pilatus PC-7 (operated by the PC-7 Team & Alap-Alap Formation) (1989)
- Pilatus PC-9 (operated by the Blue Phoenix) (1984)
- Pilatus PC-21 (operated by the RAAF Roulettes) (1989)

=== Taiwan / Republic of China ===
- AIDC AT-3 Republic of China Air Force Thunder Tiger Aerobatics Team

=== United Kingdom ===
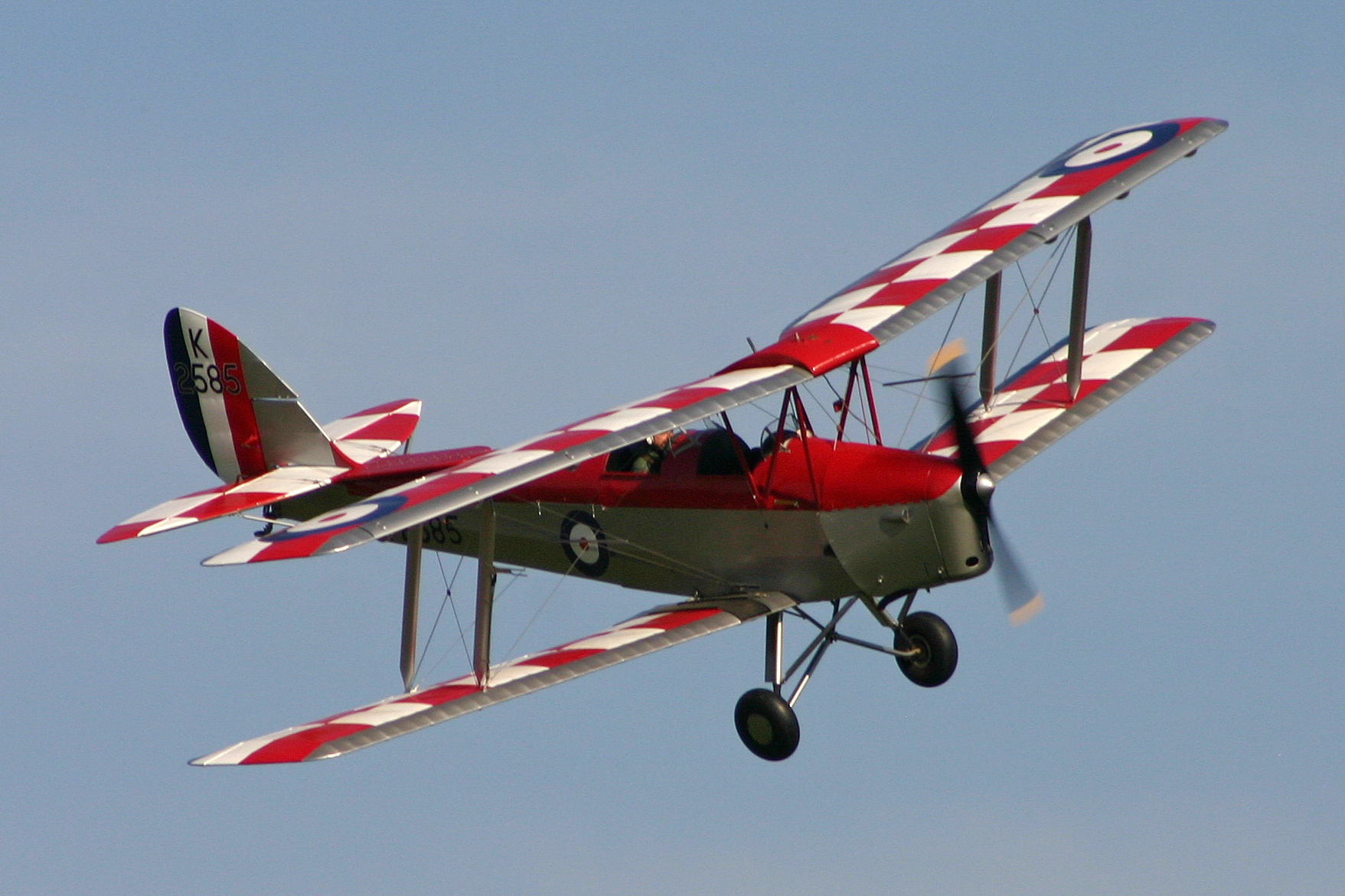
De Havilland Tiger Moth.

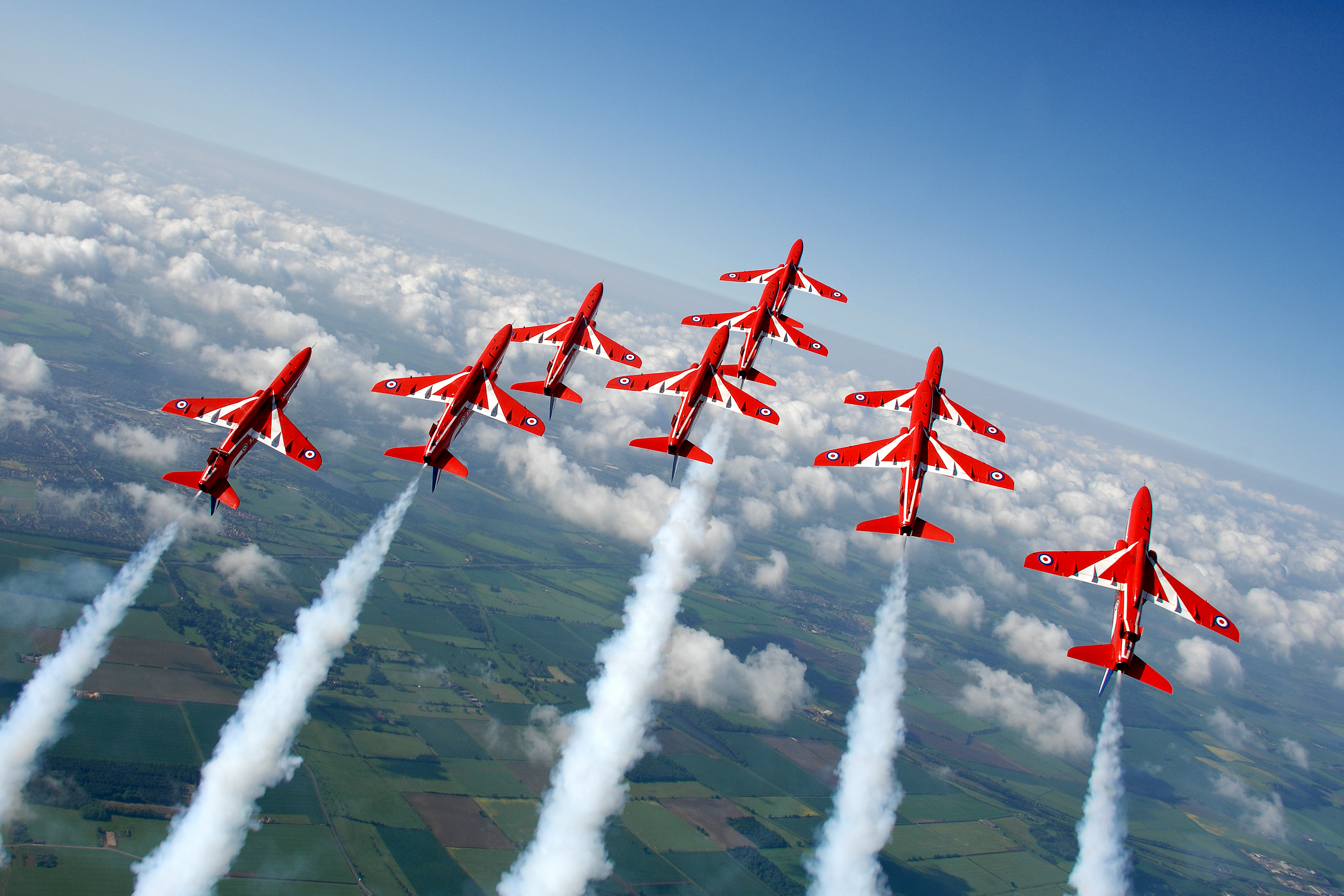
The Red Arrows Hawks performing a formation loop.

- Armstrong Whitworth Siskin (operated by the Siskins) (1921)
- Arrow Active (1931)
- Auster Aiglet Trainer (1951)
- Avro Avian (1926)
- Avro Cadet (1931)
- BAe Hawk (9 operated by the Red Arrows) (1974)
- Cranfield A1 Eagle (1976)
- Currie Wot (homebuilt 1937)
- De Havilland Tiger Moth (1931)
- de Havilland Sea Venom
- de Havilland Sea Vixen (operated by Simon's Sircus) (1951)
- FLS Sprint (1983)
- Folland Gnat (9 operated by the Yellowjacks and the Red Arrows) (1955)
- Hawker Hunter (16 operated by the Black Arrows & 1 by Miss Demeanor) (1951)
- Hunting Percival Jet Provost (operated by the Red Pelicans) (1954)
- Miles Satyr (1932)
- Slingsby T67 Firefly (1974)
- Sopwith Scooter (1918)
- Sopwith Swallow (1918)
- Southern Martlet (1929)
- Speedtwin E2E Comet 1 (1991)

=== United Kingdom / Germany / Italy ===
- Panavia Tornado (19??)

=== United Kingdom / Germany / Spain / Italy ===
- Eurofighter Typhoon (19??)

=== United States ===
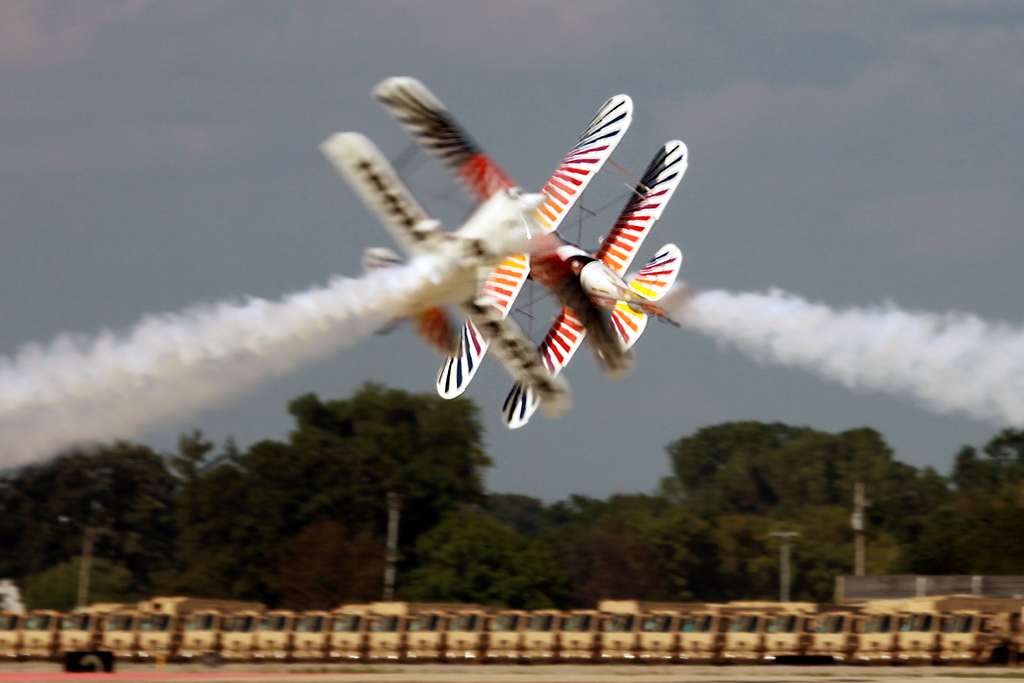
Christen Eagle IIs of the Iron Eagles

- Acro Sport I (homebuilt, 1972)
- Acro Sport II (homebuilt)
- Aircraft Technologies Acro 1 (homebuilt 1993)
- Aircraft Technologies Atlantis (homebuilt, 1996)
- American Champion Citabria (1964)
- American Champion Decathlon (1970)
- American Champion Super Decathlon (1976)
- Bede BD-8 (homebuilt, 1980)
- Beechcraft T-34 Mentor (1948)
- Beechcraft Bonanza (1947)
- Boeing F2B (1926)
- Bradley BA-100 Aerobat
- Bradley BA-200 ATAC
- Cessna 150 Aerobat (1957)
- Cessna 152 Aerobat (1977)

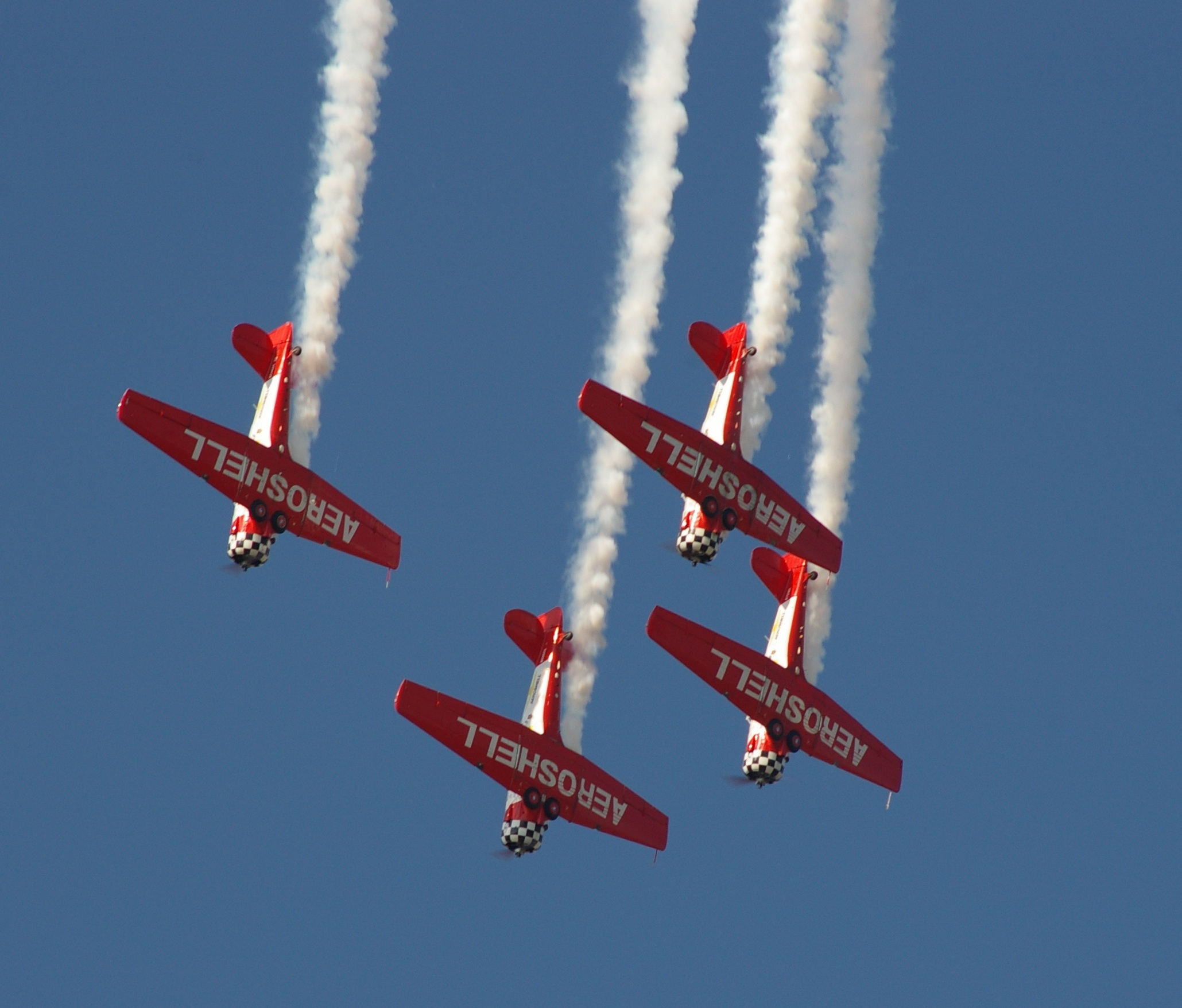
North American Texans performing at AirVenture Oshkosh.

- Christen Eagle II/Aviat Eagle II (1977)
- Culp Special
- Curtiss JN-4 (1915)
- Curtiss F7C Seahawk (1927)
- Curtiss Hawk II (1932)
- Curtiss Gulfhawk (1923)
- D'Apuzzo Senior Aero Sport (homebuilt, 1962)
- Franklin Demon-1 (homebuilt)
- Freiberger Ron's 1 (homebuilt, 1971)
- Giles G-200 (homebuilt)
- Giles G-202 (homebuilt)
- Great Lakes Sport Trainer (1929)
- Grumman G-22 Gulfhawk II (1938)
- Hatz Classic (homebuilt, 1990s)
- Howland H-2A Honey Bee (homebuilt, 1986)
- Keleher Lark (homebuilt)
- Kraft Super Fli (homebuilt, 1974)
- Laser 200 (homebuilt, 1970)
- McCarley Mini-Mac (homebuilt, 1970)
- Merkel Mark II (homebuilt)
- Monocoupe 110 Special
- Mustang Aeronautics Midget Mustang (homebuilt, 1948)
- Mustang Aeronautics Mustang II (homebuilt, 1966)

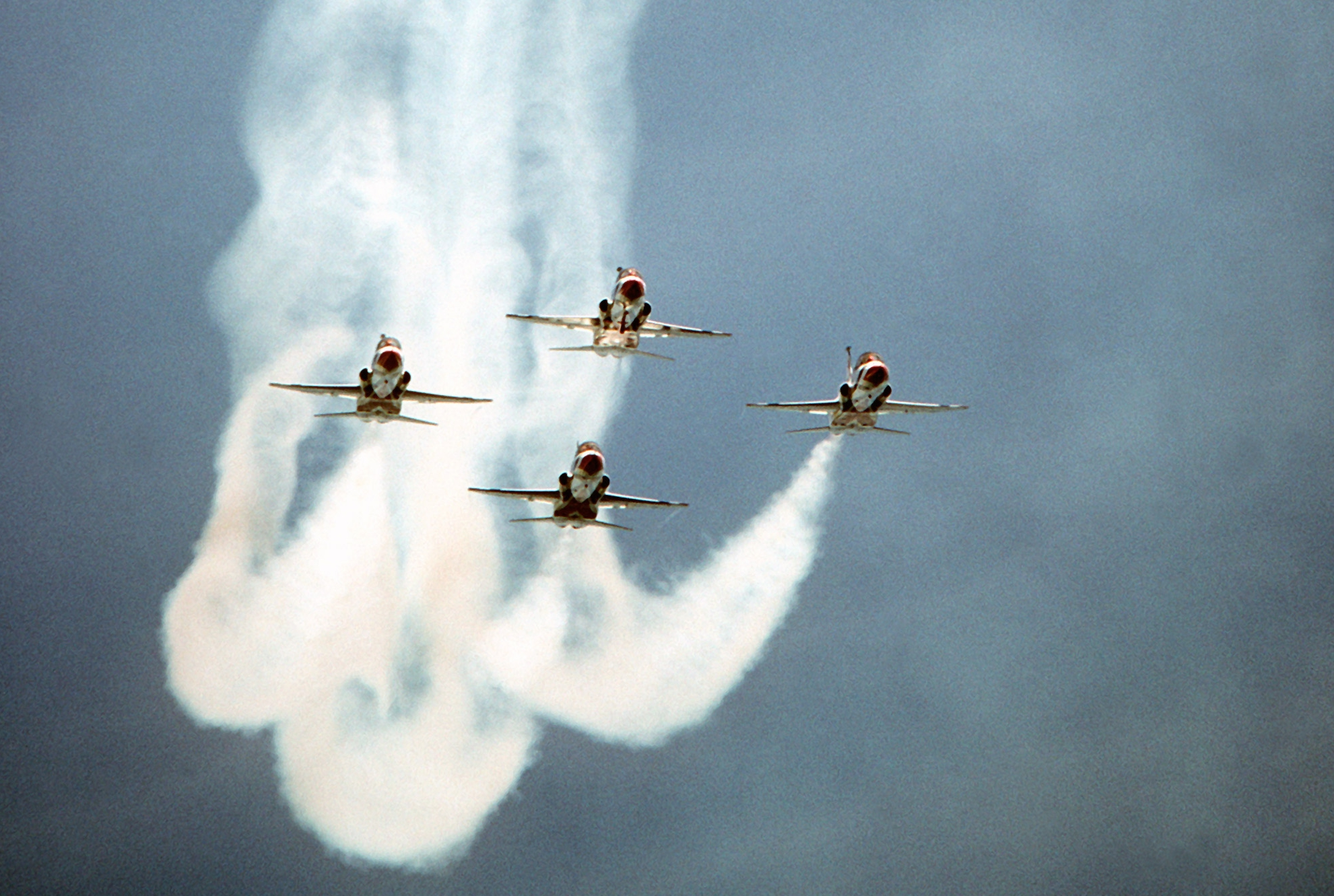
USAF Thunderbirds T-38s coming out of the bottom of a formation loop.

- North American P-51 Mustang (1940)
- North American SNJ/T-6 Texan (1935)
- Piper J-3 Cub (Flying farmer act) (1938)
- Piper PA-18 Super Cub (1949)
- Pitts Special (homebuilt, 1944)
- Pitts Model 12 (homebuilt, 1996)

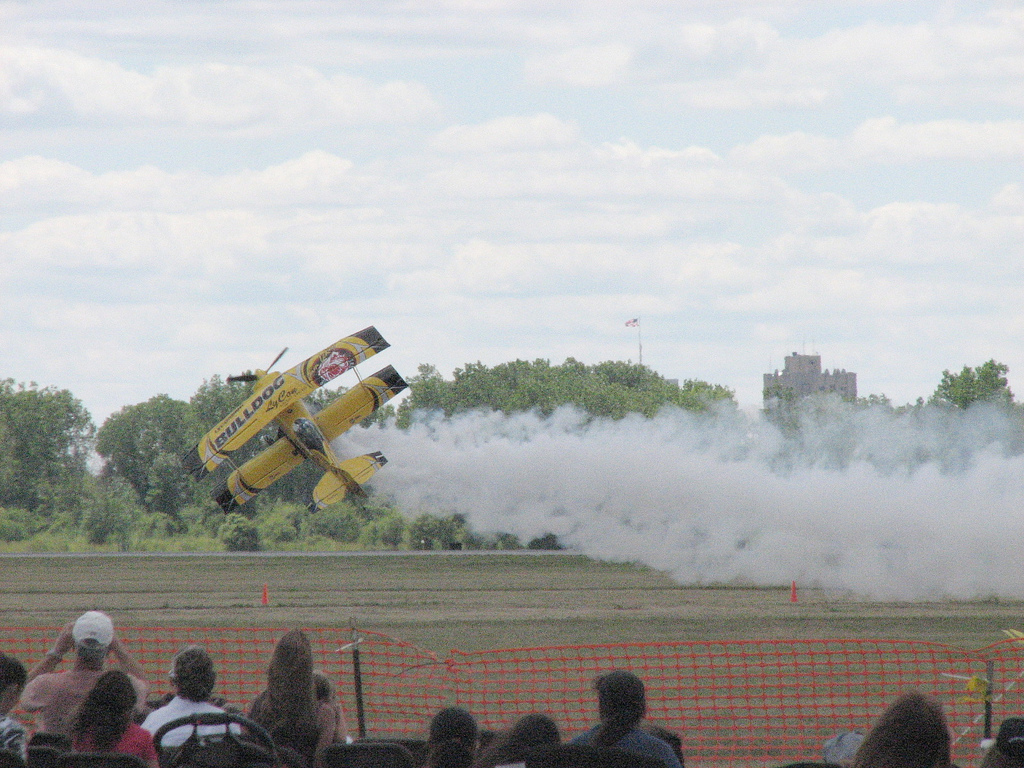
Pitts S-2 in low level sideways flight.

- Rans S-9 Chaos (homebuilt, 1986)
- Rans S-10 Sakota (homebuilt, 1988)
- Rans S-16 Shekari (homebuilt, 1994)
- Reflex Lightning Bug (homebuilt, 1990s)
- Rihn DR-107 One Design (homebuilt, 1993)
- Rihn DR-109 (homebuilt, 1990s)
- Rose Parakeet (homebuilt, 1931)
- Rowley P-40F (homebuilt replica, 1986)
- Rud Aero RA-2 (2012)
- Rud Aero RA-3 (2013)
- Ryan STA (1934)
- Shober Willie II (homebuilt, 1971)
- SkyDancer SD-260 (homebuilt, 1990s)
- Skipper Scrappy UAC-200 (homebuilt, 1970)
- Skyote Aeromarine Skyote (homebuilt, 1976)
- Sonex Aircraft SubSonex (homebuilt, 2009)
- Sorrell Hiperbipe (homebuilt)
- Spinks Akromaster (homebuilt)
- Sport Flight Talon Typhoon (homebuilt, 1989)
- Starfire Firebolt (homebuilt)
- Staudacher S-300 (1990)
- Staudacher S-600 (2010)
- Stearman Model 75 (1934)
- Steen Skybolt (homebuilt, 1970)
- Stephens Akro (homebuilt, 1967)
- Stewart S-51D Mustang (homebuilt, 1994)
- Stolp Acroduster (homebuilt)
- Stolp Acroduster Too (homebuilt)
- Stolp Starduster (homebuilt)
- Stolp Starduster Too (homebuilt)
- Stolp SA-900 V-Star (homebuilt)
- Super Chipmunk (modified De Havilland Canada DHC-1 Chipmunk)

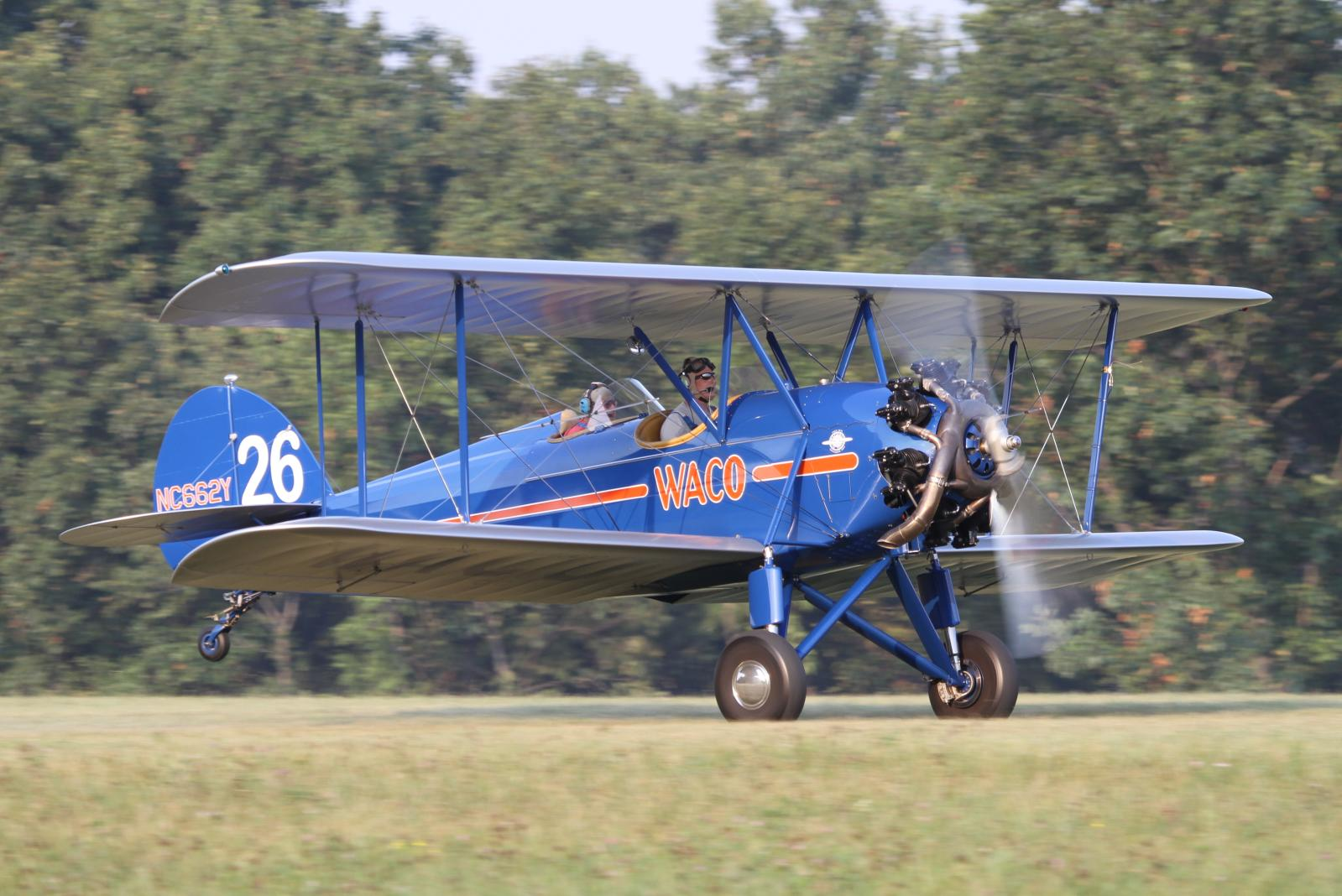
Waco ASO.

- Terle Sportplane (homebuilt, 1931)
- Travel Air 2000 (1925)
- Travel Air 3000 (1928)
- Travel Air 4000 (1929)
- Van's Aircraft RV-3 (homebuilt, 1971)
- Van's Aircraft RV-4 (homebuilt, 1980)
- Van's Aircraft RV-7 (homebuilt, 2001)
- Van's Aircraft RV-8 (homebuilt, 1995)
- Van's Aircraft RV-14 (homebuilt, 2012)
- Viper Aircraft Viperfan (homebuilt, 1990s)
- Velox Revolution 1 (homebuilt)
- Waco 10/GXE/ASO/CSO/DSO/ATO/CTO (1927)
- Waco A series (1932)
- Waco F series (1930)
- Zivko Edge 540 (1993)

=== Yugoslavia ===
- Ikarus IK-2 (1935)
- Rogožarski SIM-XI (1938)
- Soko G-2 Galeb (1961)
- Soko G-4 Super Galeb (1978)

== Gliders ==
=== Bulgaria ===
- Kometa-Standard (1960)

=== Czechoslovakia ===
- Letov LF-107 Luňák (1948)
- Let L-13A Blanik
- Let L-13AC Blanik

=== Germany ===
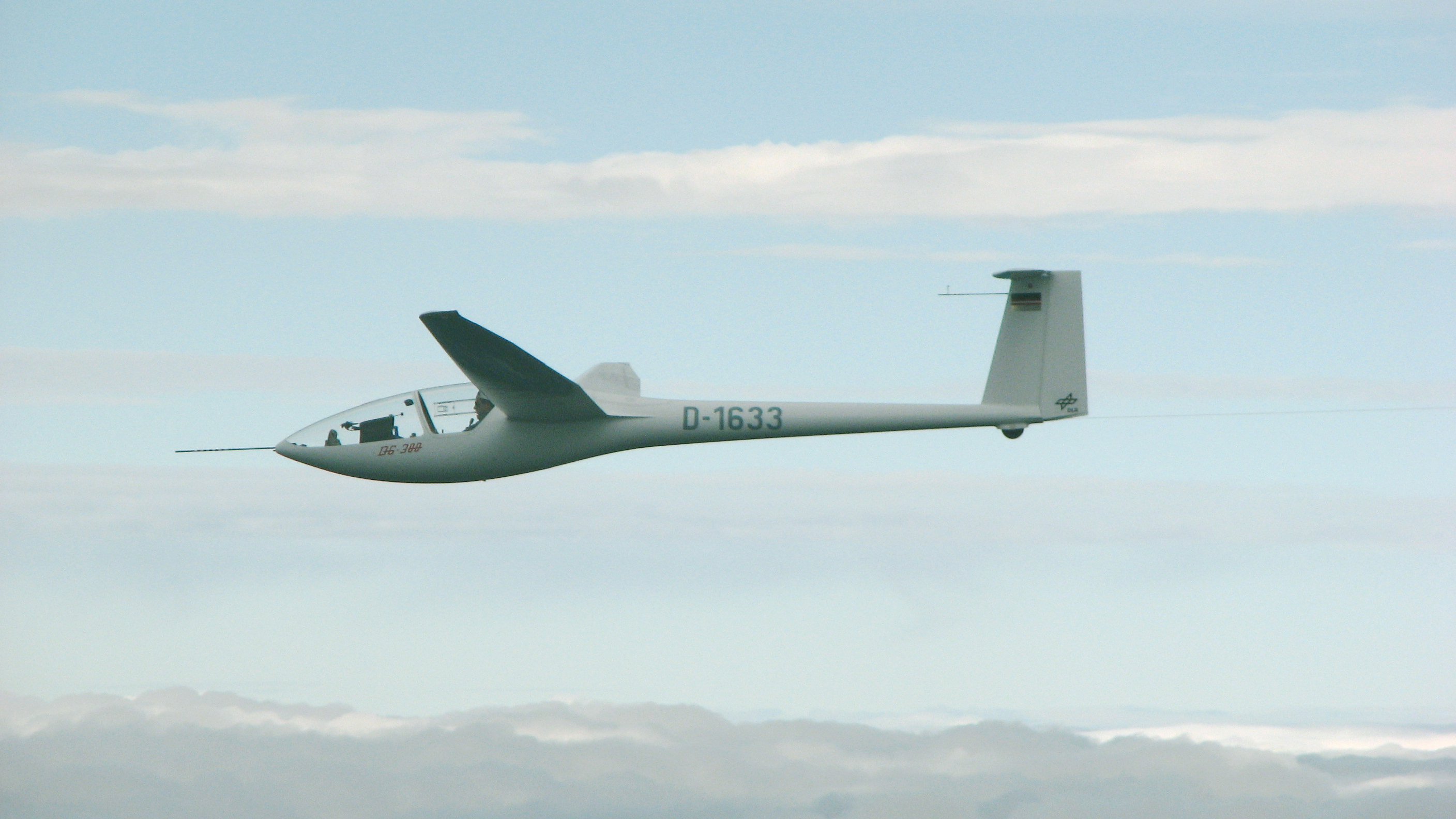
Glaser-Dirks DG-300.

- Akaflieg München Mü28 (1983)
- DFS Habicht (1936)
- Glaser-Dirks DG-300 Acro (1983)
- Glasflügel H-101 (1970)
- Grob G103a Twin II (1980?)
- Grob G109 (19??)
- LCF II (1975)
- Schempp-Hirth Standard Austria (1959)
- Schleicher ASK 21 (1979)
- Vogt Lo-100 (1952)
- Glasflügel H101 Salto (1970)

=== Italy ===
- Bonomi BS.14 Astore (1935)
- Piana Canova PC.500 (1937)

=== Poland ===
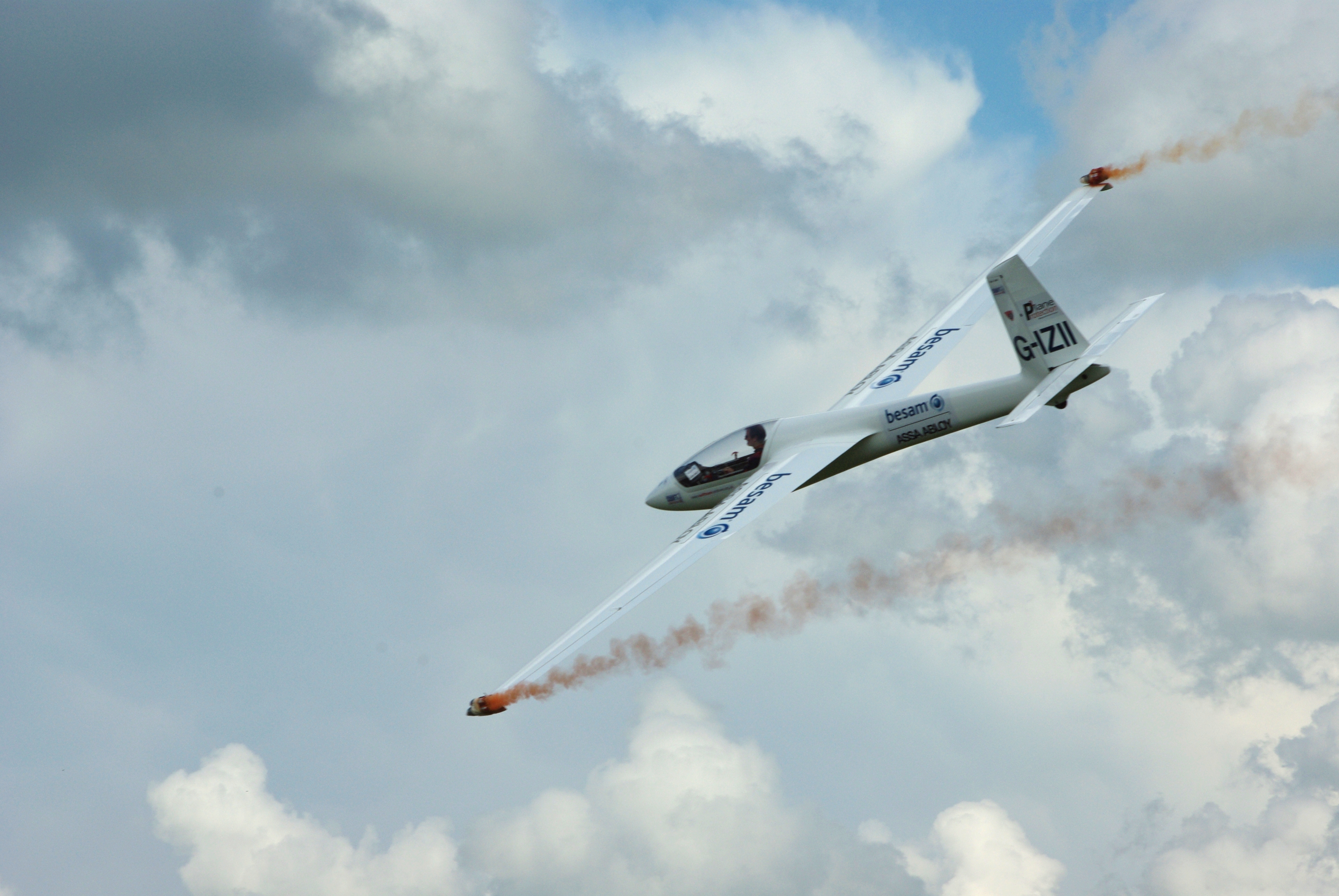
Marganski Swift S-1 performing at Old Warden.

- Allstar SZD-59 (1991)
- Instytut Szybownictwa IS-4 Jastrząb (1949)
- Marganski Swift S-1 (1991)
- MDM MDM-1 Fox (1993)
- SZD-C Żuraw (1952)
- SZD-21 Kobuz (1961)
- SZD-22 Mucha Standard (1958)
- SZD-24 Foka (1960)
- SZD-32 Foka 5 (1966)
- SZD-50 Puchacz (1979)
- Allstar SZD-59 (1991)
- Allstar SZD-54 Perkoz (2011)

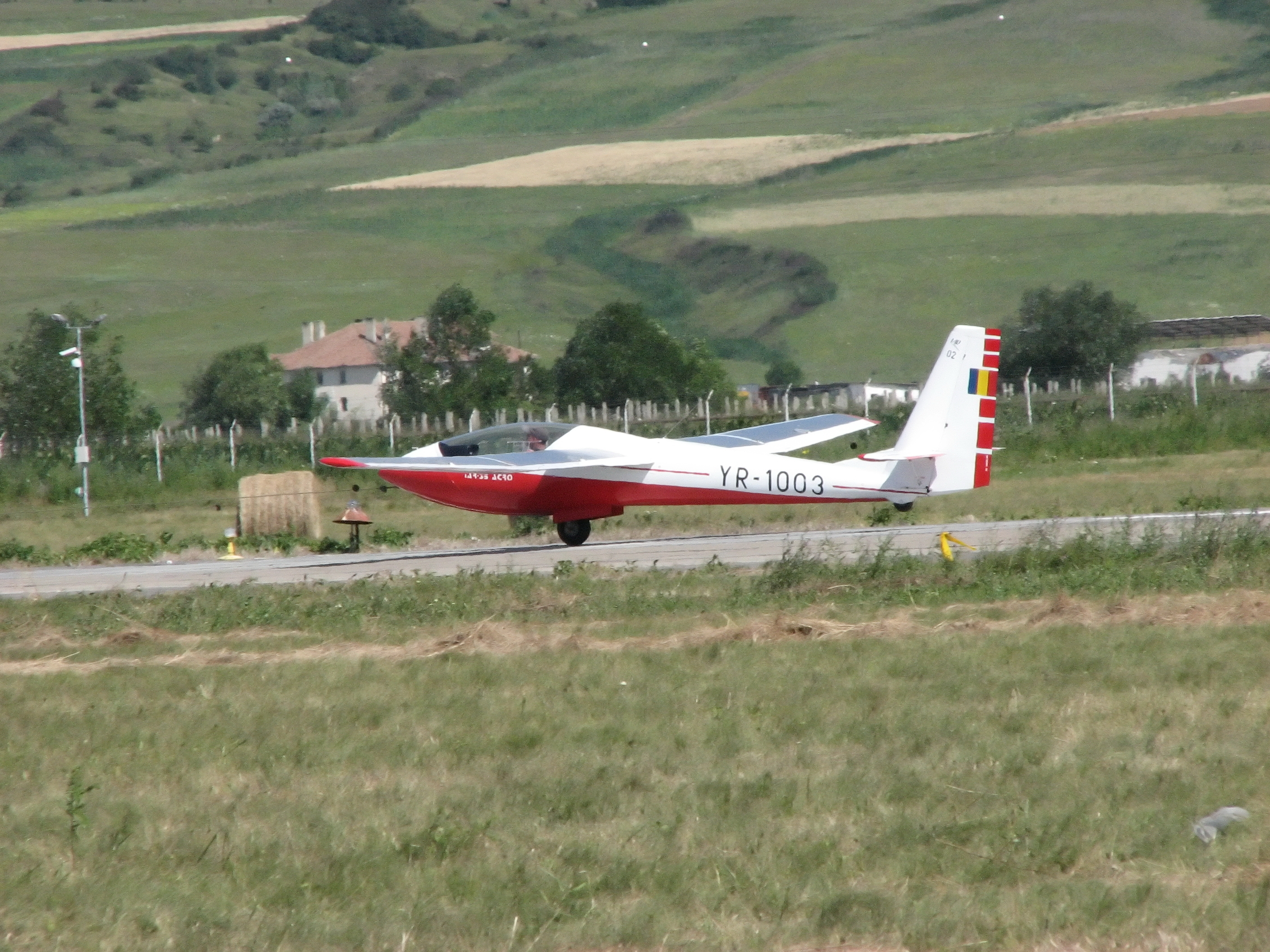
IAR-35 Acro aircraft (registration number YR-1003), at an airshow near Cluj-Napoca, in 2007.

=== Romania ===
- ICA IS-28 (1970)
- ICA IS-29 (1970)
- ICA IAR-35 (1986)

=== Soviet Ukraine ===
- Antonov A-13 (1958)

=== South Africa ===
- Celair GA-1 Celstar (1989)

=== Sweden ===
- Radab Windex (1985)

=== Yugoslavia ===
- SVC Mačka (1956)

== See also ==
- List of aerobatic teams
- List of flight demonstration teams
