= R34 =

R34 may refer to:

- Nissan Skyline (R34), a mid-size car
  - Nissan Skyline GT-R (R34), a sports car
- R34 (New York City Subway car)
- R34 (South Africa)
- HM Airship R.34, a rigid airship of the Royal Air Force
- HMS Cockade (R34), a destroyer of the Royal Navy
- R34: Causes burns, a risk phrase
- Renard R.34, a Belgian trainer biplane
- Rule 34, a statement that pornography is concerned in every single character or someone
