= McCarley =

McCarley is a surname. Notable people with the surname include:

- Erin McCarley (born 1979), American singer-songwriter
- Kyle McCarley, American voice actor
- Mike McCarley, American businessman
- Robert McCarley (1937–2017), American psychiatrist

== See also ==
- McCarley, Mississippi, unincorporated community in Mississippi, United States
- McCarleys Corners, Ontario, community in Ontario, Canada
- McCarley Mini-Mac, American sport aircraft
