= Ultimate 10-200 =

Canadian homebuilt aerobatic aircraft

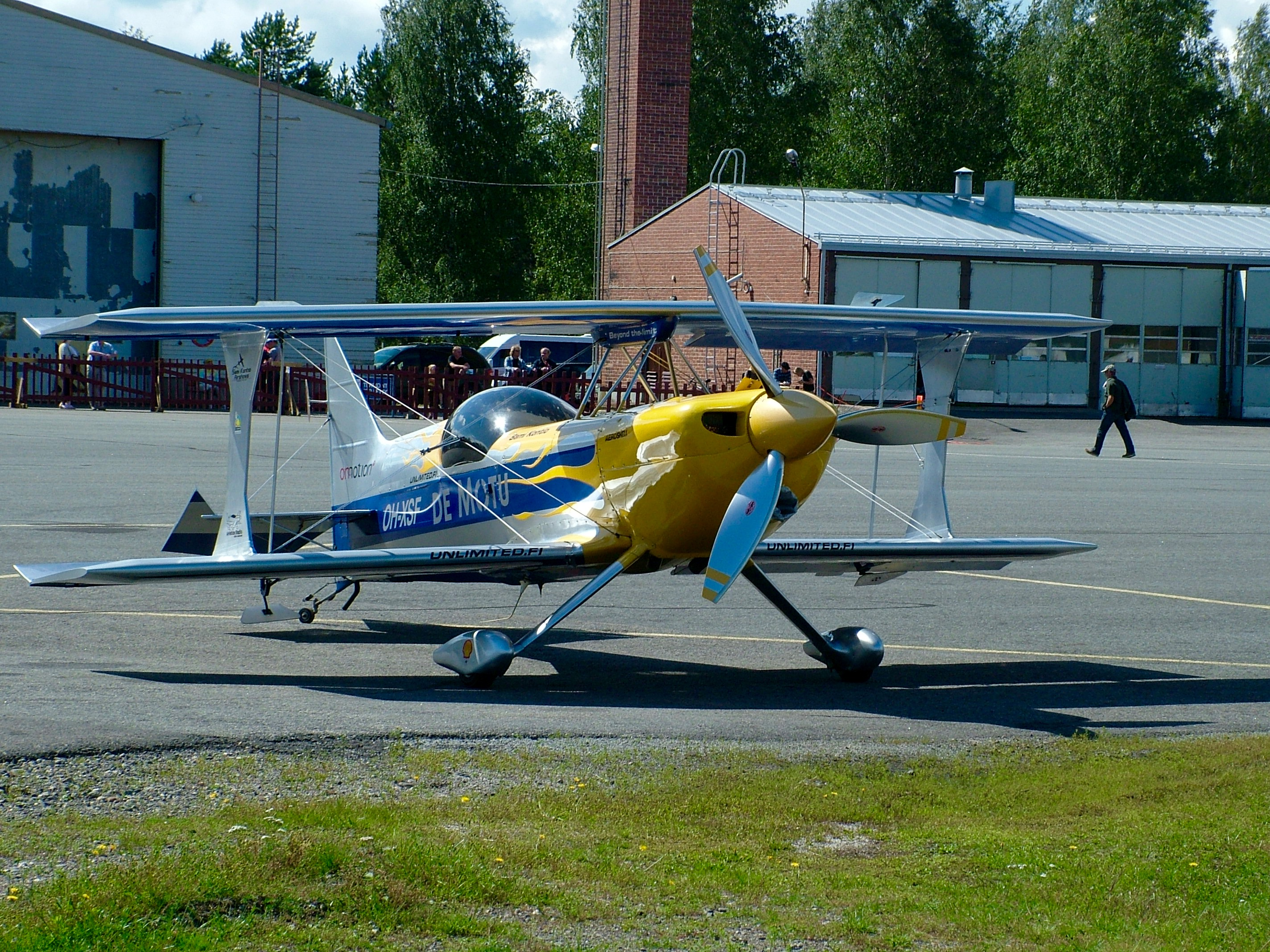
- Ultimate 10-300

General information
- Type: Homebuilt aircraft
- National origin: Canada
- Manufacturer: Streamline Welding
- Status: Production completed

History
- Introduction date: 1990s

The Ultimate 10-200 is a Canadian homebuilt aerobatic biplane that was designed produced by Streamline Welding of Hamilton, Ontario, introduced in the 1990s. When it was available the aircraft was supplied as a kit or in the form of plans for amateur construction.

== Design and development ==
The aircraft started out as a replacement set of wings for the Pitts Special and eventually a new fuselage was designed to go with the wing set. The resulting aircraft features a strut-braced biplane layout, with cabane struts, interplane struts and flying wires, a single-seat, enclosed cockpit under a bubble canopy, fixed conventional landing gear with wheel pants and a single engine in tractor configuration.

The aircraft is made from metal with its flying surfaces covered in doped aircraft fabric. Its wing span is only 16.00 ft (4.9 m). The acceptable power range varies by each model. Standard equipment includes an inverted fuel system and rear-hinged canopy. Operational g loads are +7 and -5 g. The aircraft has a roll rate of 360 degrees per second.

The 10-200 version has a typical empty weight of 925 lb (420 kg) and a gross weight of 1,320 lb (600 kg), giving a useful load of 395 lb (179 kg). With full fuel of 22 U.S. gallons (83 L; 18 imp gal) the payload for the pilot and baggage is 263 lb (119 kg).

The standard day, sea level, no wind, take off with a 200 hp (149 kW) engine is 450 ft (137 m) and the landing roll is 500 ft (152 m).

The manufacturer estimated the construction time from the supplied kit as 1200 hours.

== Operational history ==
In March 2014 six examples were registered in the United States with the Federal Aviation Administration, although a total of 12 had been registered at one time. Also in March 2014 two were registered in Canada with Transport Canada.

== Variants ==
Ultimate 10-180
Model powered by the 180 hp (134 kW) Lycoming O-360 powerplant
Ultimate 10-200
Model powered by the 200 hp (149 kW) Lycoming IO-360 powerplant
Ultimate 10-300
Model powered by the 300 hp (224 kW) Lycoming IO-540 powerplant

== Specifications (Ultimate 10-200) ==
Data from AeroCrafter

General characteristics

- Crew: one
- Length: 16 ft 6 in (5.03 m)
- Wingspan: 16 ft 0 in (4.88 m)
- Empty weight: 925 lb (420 kg)
- Gross weight: 1,350 lb (612 kg)
- Fuel capacity: 22 U.S. gallons (83 L; 18 imp gal)
- Powerplant: 1 × Lycoming IO-360 four cylinder, air-cooled, four stroke aircraft engine, 200 hp (150 kW)
- Propellers: 3-bladed constant speed propeller

Performance

- Maximum speed: 220 mph (350 km/h, 190 kn)
- Cruise speed: 170 mph (270 km/h, 150 kn)
- Stall speed: 60 mph (97 km/h, 52 kn)
- Range: 500 mi (800 km, 430 nmi)
- Rate of climb: 2,000 ft/min (10 m/s)

== See also ==
- List of aerobatic aircraft
