= Tech Aero TR 200 =

French homebuilt aircraft

TR 200

General information
- Type: Homebuilt aircraft
- National origin: France
- Manufacturer: Tech Aero
- Status: Production completed

History
- First flight: August 1988

The Tech Aero TR 200 is a French homebuilt aerobatic aircraft that was designed and produced by Tech Aero of Glisolles, first flown in August 1988. When it was available, the aircraft was supplied as a kit for amateur construction.

== Design and development ==
Designed as a trainer for the unlimited class, the TR 200 features a cantilever low-wing, a two-seats-in-tandem enclosed cockpit under a bubble canopy, fixed conventional landing gear with wheel pants and a single engine in tractor configuration.

The aircraft is made from wood. Its 7.42 m (24.3 ft) span wing has a wing area of 10.0 m^{2} (108 sq ft). The cabin width is 71 cm (28 in). The acceptable power range is 200 to 260 hp (149 to 194 kW) and the standard engine used is the 200 hp (149 kW) Lycoming AEIO-360 powerplant.

The TR 200 has a typical empty weight of 570 kg (1,260 lb) and a gross weight of 870 kg (1,920 lb), giving a useful load of 300 kg (660 lb). With full fuel of 160 litres (35 imp gal; 42 US gal) the payload for pilot, passenger and baggage is 186 kg (410 lb).

The standard day, sea level, no wind, take off with a 200 hp (149 kW) engine is 400 m (1,312 ft) and the landing roll is 450 m (1,476 ft).

The manufacturer estimated the construction time from the supplied kit as 800 hours.

== Specifications (TR 200) ==
Data from AeroCrafter

General characteristics

- Crew: one
- Capacity: one passenger
- Length: 6.41 m (21.02 ft)
- Wingspan: 7.42 m (24 ft 4 in)
- Wing area: 9.99 m^{2} (107.5 sq ft)
- Empty weight: 570 kg (1,257 lb)
- Gross weight: 870 kg (1,918 lb)
- Fuel capacity: 160 litres (35 imp gal; 42 US gal)
- Powerplant: 1 × Lycoming AEIO-360 four cylinder, air-cooled, fuel-injected, four stroke aircraft engine, 150 kW (200 hp)
- Propellers: 3-bladed constant speed propeller

Performance

- Maximum speed: 325 km/h (202 mph, 176 kn)
- Cruise speed: 270 km/h (168 mph, 146 kn)
- Stall speed: 95 km/h (59 mph, 51 kn)
- Range: 950 km (590 mi, 510 nmi)
- Service ceiling: 5,500 m (18,000 ft)
- Rate of climb: 11 m/s (2,200 ft/min)
- Wing loading: 87 kg/m^{2} (17.8 lb/sq ft)

== See also ==
- List of aerobatic aircraft
