= Rud Aero =

American business

- Industry: Aerospace
- Genre: Aircraft manufacturer
- Founded: 2011
- Founder: Taras Rud
- Headquarters: Sebastian, Florida, United States
- Products: Light aircraft
- Services: Composite material manufacturing and prototyping, computer-aided manufacturing, 5-Axis Gantry Mill, Tool Design
- Number of employees: 20-30
- Website: www.rud.aero

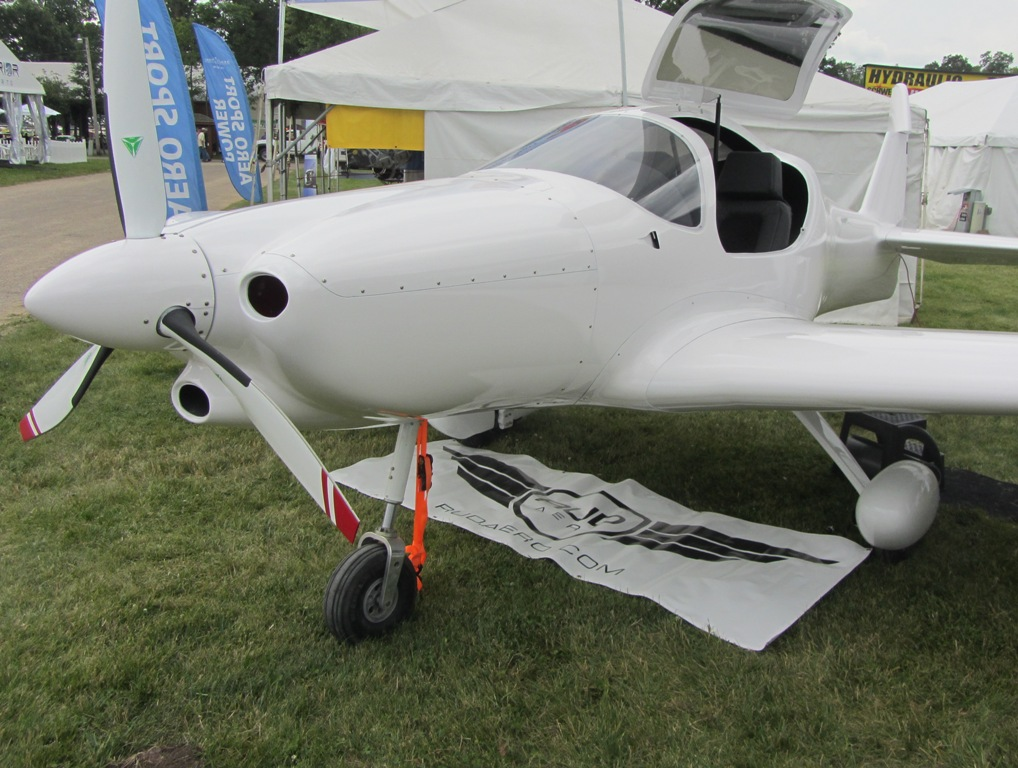
Rud Aero RA-3

Rud Aero is an American aircraft manufacturer.

The company occupies a 35,000 sq. ft building at Sebastian Municipal Airport.

== Aircraft ==
Summary of aircraft built by Rud Aero
Model name	First flight	Number built	Type
RA-2 Unlimited Aerobatic Aircraft	2013	1	Tandem +/- 13G Aerobatic
RA-2L Aerobatic Aircraft	2014	0	Tandem +/- 8G Aerobatic
RA-3 Aerobatic Aircraft / Touring	2013	1	Side by Side +/- 8G Aerobatic
RA-4	2014	0	Four place composite high wing
