= Freiberger Ron's 1 =

Ron's 1

General information
- Type: Two-seat homebuilt aerobatic monoplane
- National origin: United States
- Designer: Ronald Darwin Freiberger

History
- First flight: November 1971

The Freiberger Ron's 1 is an American two-seat homebuilt aerobatic monoplane designed and built by Ronald D. Freiberger, it was highly modified aerobatic variant of the Spezio Tuholer.

== Design and development ==
Freiberger, a design engineer at General Motors and Rose-Hulman graduate flew Ron's 1 in November 1971, it was a braced low-wing monoplane with a welded steel-tube fuselage covered with Ceconite. The two-spar wing had vee-bracing struts and was made of wood with a Ceconite covering. Ron's 1 had a fixed tailwheel type landing gear with fairings over the main wheels, the pilot and passenger sat in tandem open cockpits. Powered by a 160 hp (119 kW) Lycoming O-320-B1B flat-four air-cooled engine driving a two-bladed metal fixed pitch propeller, Freiberger enclosed the engine in a radial-style cowling to give the aircraft a look of the early 1930s racing aircraft.

== Specifications ==
Data from Jane's All the World's Aircraft 1973–74

General characteristics

- Crew: 2
- Length: 19 ft 0 in (5.79 m)
- Wingspan: 24 ft 6 in (7.47 m)
- Height: 4 ft 0 in (1.22 m)
- Empty weight: 1,135 lb (514 kg)
- Gross weight: 1,800 lb (816 kg)
- Powerplant: 1 × Lycoming O-320-B1B flat-four air-cooled engine , 160 hp (120 kW)

Performance

- Maximum speed: 140 mph (225 km/h, 120 kn)
- Cruise speed: 110 mph (177 km/h, 96 kn)
- Endurance: 3 hours 0 minutes
- Service ceiling: 10,000 ft (3,050 m)
- Rate of climb: 1,300 ft/min (6.6 m/s)
