= McCarley Mini-Mac =

Aerobatic sport aircraft

Mini-Mac

General information
- Type: Sport aircraft
- National origin: United States
- Manufacturer: Homebuilt
- Designer: Charles McCarley

History
- First flight: July 1970

The McCarley Mini-Mac was a single-seat aerobatic sport aircraft designed in the United States in the early 1970s and marketed for home building. It was a conventional, low-wing cantilever monoplane with a cockpit enclosed by a bubble canopy. The undercarriage was of fixed, tricycle type with spats fitted to the prototype, as well as a small skid fitted as a tail bumper. Construction was of metal throughout.

== Specifications (prototype) ==
Data from Jane's All the World's Aircraft 1977–78, 546

General characteristics

- Crew: One pilot
- Length: 14 ft 8 in (4.47 m)
- Wingspan: 20 ft 6 in (6.25 m)
- Height: 5 ft 8 in (1.73 m)
- Empty weight: 514 lb (233 kg)
- Gross weight: 800 lb (363 kg)
- Powerplant: 1 × converted Volkswagen automotive engine

Performance

- Maximum speed: 160 mph (260 km/h, 140 kn)
- Range: 500 mi (800 km, 430 nmi)
- Service ceiling: 8,000 ft (2,400 m)
- Rate of climb: 1,000 ft/min (5.1 m/s)
