= Merkel Mark II =

American homebuilt aircraft

Mark II

General information
- Type: Homebuilt aircraft
- National origin: United States
- Manufacturer: Merkel Airplane Company
- Designer: Edwin Merkel
- Status: Plans no longer available

The Merkel Mark II is an American homebuilt aerobatic biplane that was designed by Edwin Merkel and produced by the Merkel Airplane Company of Wichita, Kansas in the form of plans for amateur construction.

Designer Merkel died on 12 March 2012 and plans are no longer available.

== Design and development ==
The Mark II features a two-seats-in-tandem open cockpit with an optional bubble canopy, fixed conventional landing gear and a single engine in tractor configuration. The Mark II was intended as a two-seat trainer version as a companion to a planned single-seat competition version.

The aircraft is made from welded steel tubing with the airframe covered in sheet aluminum. Its 25.5 ft (7.8 m) span wings employ a NACA 23012 airfoil and each has a single torsional spar. The standard engine recommended was a 220 hp (164 kW) Franklin Engine Company powerplant.

The aircraft has an empty weight of 1,200 lb (540 kg) and a gross weight of 1,540 lb (700 kg), giving a useful load of 340 lb (150 kg). With full fuel of 18 U.S. gallons (68 L; 15 imp gal) the payload is 232 lb (105 kg).

== Specifications (Mark II) ==
Data from Plane and Pilot

General characteristics

- Crew: one
- Capacity: one passenger
- Length: 22 ft 9 in (6.93 m)
- Wingspan: 25 ft 6 in (7.77 m)
- Airfoil: NACA 23012
- Empty weight: 1,200 lb (544 kg)
- Gross weight: 1,540 lb (699 kg)
- Fuel capacity: 18 U.S. gallons (68 L; 15 imp gal)
- Powerplant: 1 × Franklin 6A-350-C1 air-cooled, horizontally-opposed piston aircraft engine, 220 hp (160 kW)

Performance

- Maximum speed: 206 mph (332 km/h, 179 kn)
- Cruise speed: 160 mph (260 km/h, 140 kn)
- Stall speed: 55 mph (89 km/h, 48 kn)
- Range: 250 mi (400 km, 220 nmi)
- g limits: operational: +6/-3, ultimate: +9/-4.5
- Rate of climb: 2,500 ft/min (13 m/s)
