= Sivel SD28 =

SD28

General information
- Type: Two-seat aerobatic monoplane
- National origin: Italy
- Manufacturer: Sivel Aeronautica

History
- First flight: 1995

The Sivel SD28 is an Italian two-seat aerobatic monoplane designed and built by Sivel Aeronautica. The SD28 is a low-wing monoplane with side-by-side seating for two and dual controls. The SD28 is powered by a nose-mounted Lycoming AEIO-320-D piston engine and has a fixed nosewheel landing gear.

== Specifications ==
Data from Brassey's World Aircraft & Systems Directory

General characteristics

- Crew: 2
- Length: 6.8 m (22 ft 4 in)
- Wingspan: 8.4 m (27 ft 7 in)
- Height: 2.76 m (9 ft 1 in)
- Wing area: 10.0 m^{2} (107.6 sq ft)
- Empty weight: 520 kg (1,168 lb)
- Gross weight: 800 kg (1,764 lb)
- Powerplant: 1 × Lycoming AEIO-320-D piston engine , 120 kW (160 hp)

Performance

- Maximum speed: 268 km/h (166 mph, 144 kn)
- Range: 1,019 km (634 mi, 551 nmi)
