= Spezio Tuholer =

DAL 1 Tuholer
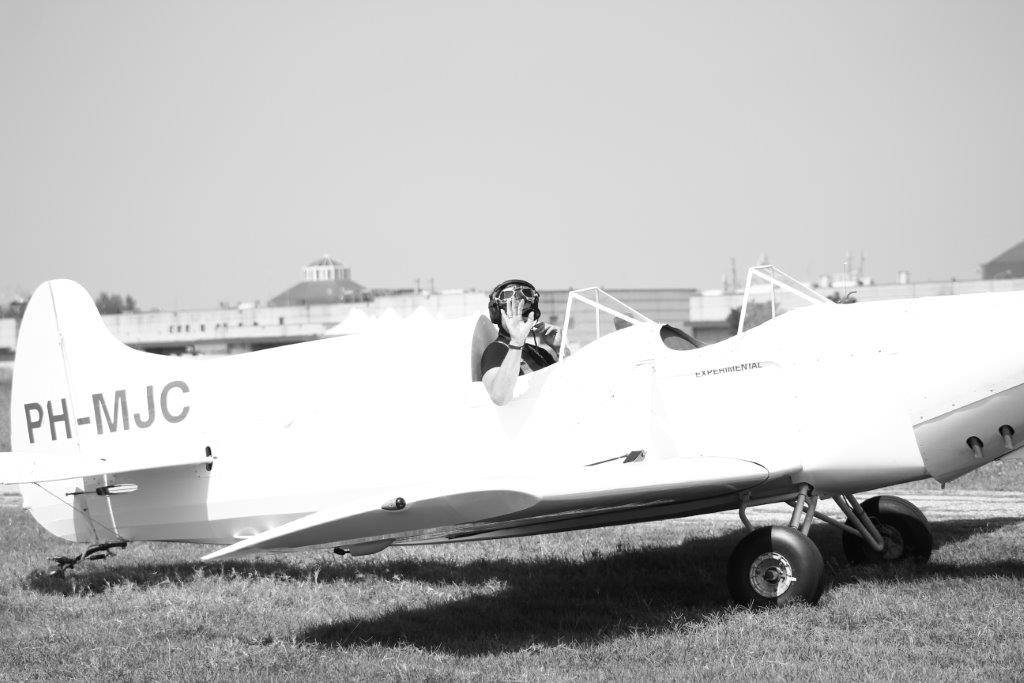

General information
- Type: Sport aircraft
- National origin: United States
- Designer: Tony Spezio

History
- First flight: May 2, 1961

The Spezio Sport DAL 1 Tuholer is a two-place low-wing homebuilt aircraft using tube-and-fabric construction. A folding wing is incorporated to allow for trailering.

== Development ==
The prototype aircraft was built for $287 using tubing from a Cessna UC 78, a Tri-Pacer propeller, wheels from a TG-6 glider, a Lycoming Ground Power unit and a variety of surplus materials. The nickname came from the president of the Experimental Aircraft Association remarking that the plane was a "two holer".

== Design ==
The Tuholer is a tandem two-seat, strut-braced, low-wing, open cockpit aircraft with conventional landing gear. The dual control aircraft can be flown solo from the rear cockpit only. The fuselage is welded steel tubing with wooden stringers and fabric covering. The dual wing spars are wood, with wood ribs and fabric covering. The fuel tank is made of fiberglass. The horizontal stabilizer uses a Piper Cub style screw jack for trim. The rear headrest can be built streamlined flush with the vertical stabilizer or tapered.

== Operational history ==
The designer flew the prototype 16 years.

== Specifications (Spezio Tuholer) ==
Data from http://www.tuholer.com/speziotuholer.htm

General characteristics

- Capacity: 2
- Length: 18 ft 3 in (5.56 m)
- Wingspan: 24 ft (7.3 m)
- Empty weight: 820 lb (372 kg)
- Gross weight: 1,200 lb (544 kg)
- Powerplant: 1 × Lycoming , 125 hp (93 kW)
- Propellers: 2-bladed

Performance

- Maximum speed: 140 kn (160 mph, 260 km/h)
- Cruise speed: 106 kn (122 mph, 196 km/h)
- Stall speed: 39 kn (45 mph, 72 km/h)
- Range: 350 nmi (400 mi, 640 km)
- Rate of climb: 2,200 ft/min (11 m/s)
