= Franklin Demon-1 =

Demon-1
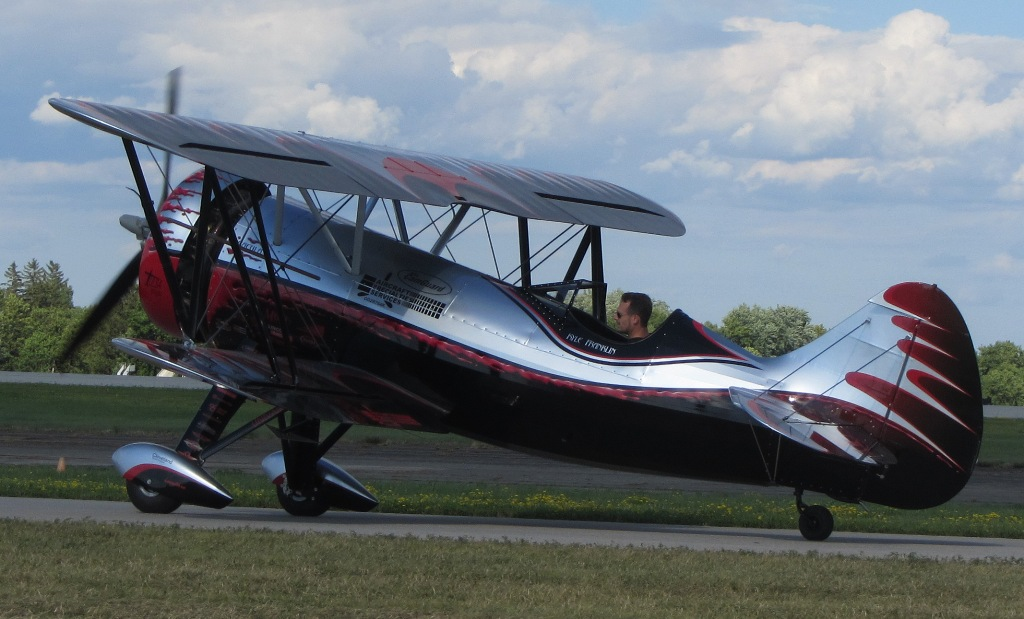
- Kyle Frankilns "Dracula" Demon-1

General information
- Type: Biplane
- National origin: United States
- Designer: Jimmy Franklin

History
- Introduction date: 2013 Balloon & SkyFest New Smyrna Beach, Florida

The Demon-1 is a custom-built biplane for aerobatic flying.

== Design and development ==
The Demon-1 is a single place, conventional landing gear equipped biplane, development of which was started in 2004. The aircraft features nearly full span ailerons. The aircraft is designed to fit on a trailer for transportation between airshows.

== Specifications (Demon-1) ==
Data from Aero News

General characteristics

- Crew: 1
- Empty weight: 1,850 lb (839 kg)
- Fuel capacity: 26 U.S. gallons (98 L; 22 imp gal)
- Powerplant: 1 × Pratt & Whitney R-985 radial engine, 550 hp (410 kW)
- Propellers: 3-bladed MT Propeller

Performance

- g limits: ±15g
- Roll rate: 300°/s

== See also ==
Aircraft of comparable role, configuration, and era

- Waco F series
