= Rud Aero RA-3 =

RA-3
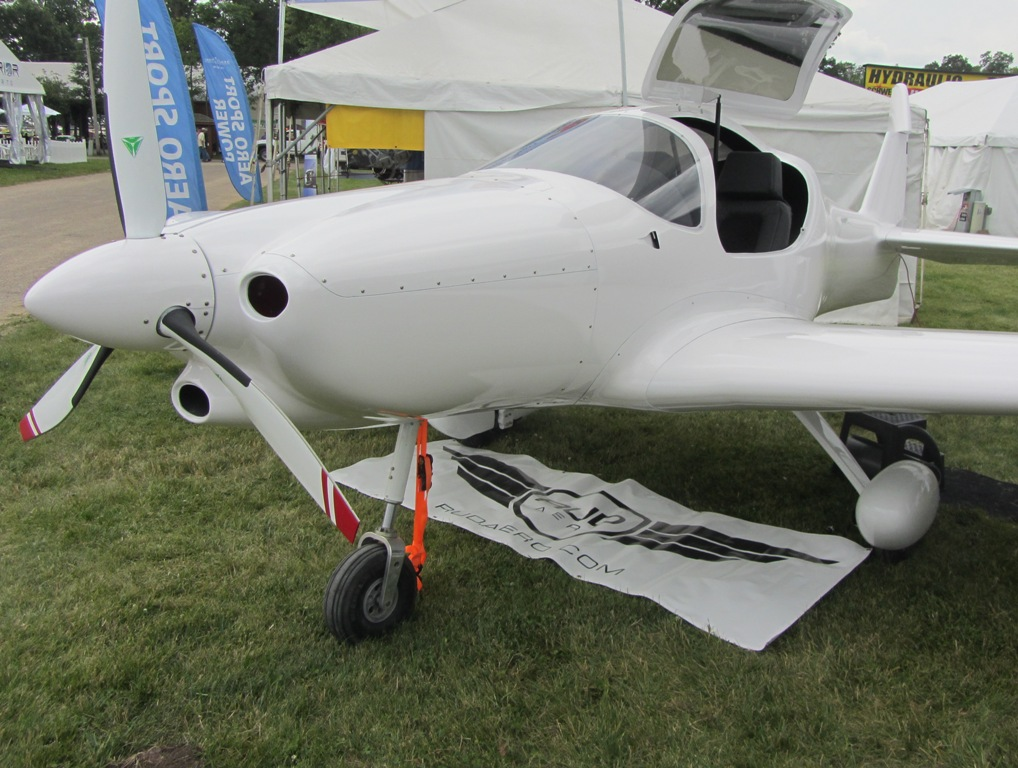

General information
- Type: Aerobatic trainer
- National origin: United States
- Manufacturer: Rud Aero

History
- Introduction date: 2013

The Rud Aero RA-3 is an American composite aerobatic training aircraft, produced by Rud Aero.

== Design and development ==
The RA-3 is a single engine two-seat, side-by-side configuration, low wing, tricycle gear composite construction aircraft. The aircraft is built using carbon fiber construction throughout. The aircraft has a cambered training wing that can be exchanged for a constant chord symmetrical wing for advanced aerobatic training. The aircraft is designed to operate as an FAR Part 21.24 aircraft, with future modifications to meet American LSA standards.

== Variants ==
RA-3
Base model
RA-3L
LSA variant

== Specifications (RA-3) ==
Data from EAA, Manufacturer

General characteristics

- Crew: 1
- Capacity: 1
- Length: 22 ft (6.7 m)
- Wingspan: 24 ft (7.3 m)
- Empty weight: 1,100 lb (499 kg)
- Gross weight: 1,800 lb (816 kg)
- Fuel capacity: 44 U.S. gallons (170 L; 37 imp gal)
- Powerplant: 1 × Lycoming IO-360 Horizontally opposed piston aircraft engine, 180 hp (130 kW)
- Propellers: 3-bladed MT Propeller constant speed propeller

Performance

- Maximum speed: 130 kn (150 mph, 240 km/h)
- Cruise speed: 117 kn (135 mph, 217 km/h)
- Stall speed: 43 kn (50 mph, 80 km/h)
- g limits: +-8g
- Rate of climb: 1,961 ft/min (9.96 m/s)

Avionics

- Dynon Skyview
