= Rud Aero RA-2 =

American aerobatic aircraft

RA-2
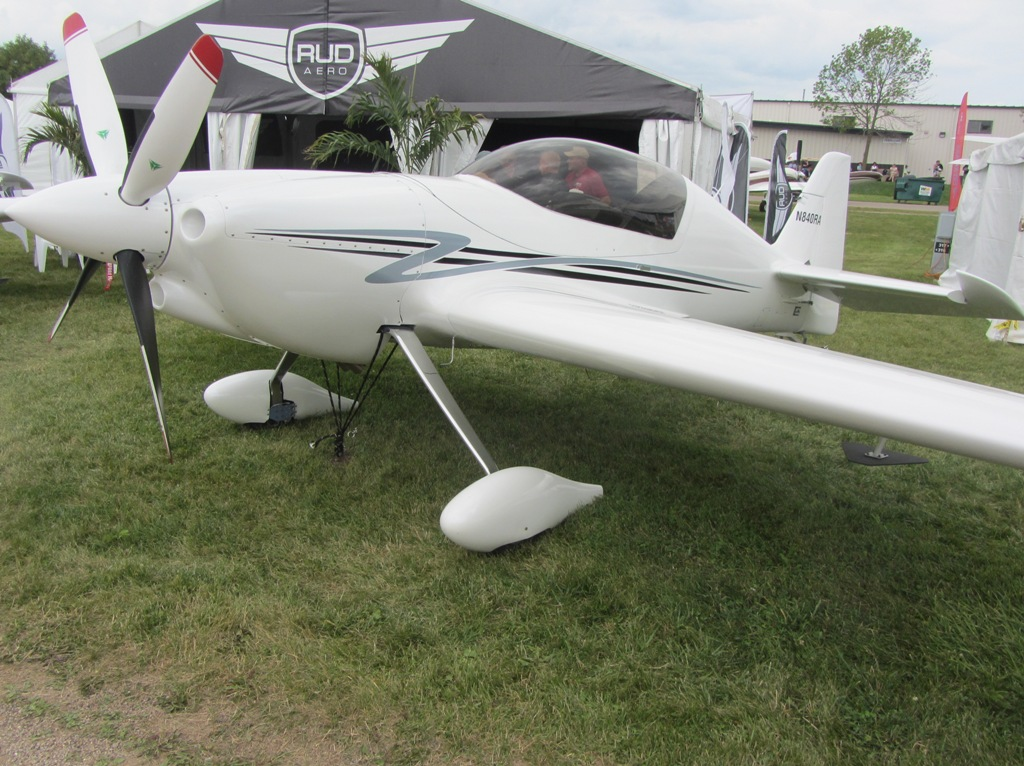

General information
- Type: Unlimited Aerobatic
- National origin: United States
- Manufacturer: Rud Aero

History
- First flight: December 2012

The Rud Aero RA-2 is an American, all carbon fiber, unlimited aerobatic aircraft built by Rud Aero in the Experimental-Exhibition category.

== Design and development ==
The RA-2 is a single engine, tandem seat, low-wing, conventional landing gear equipped aircraft, made out of carbon fiber. It uses a constant chord symmetrical airfoil. It has interchangeable aerobatic and cross-country wings.

== Variants ==
RA-2
Base model
RA-2T Trainer
Training model
RA-3
Two-seat trainer model

== Specifications (RA-2) ==
Data from EAA

General characteristics

- Crew: 1
- Capacity: 1
- Powerplant: 1 × Lycoming AEIO-580 Horizontally opposed piston, 320 hp (240 kW)
- Propellers: 4-bladed

Performance

- g limits: +- 13G
