= Aviatika-900 Acrobat =

900 Acrobat
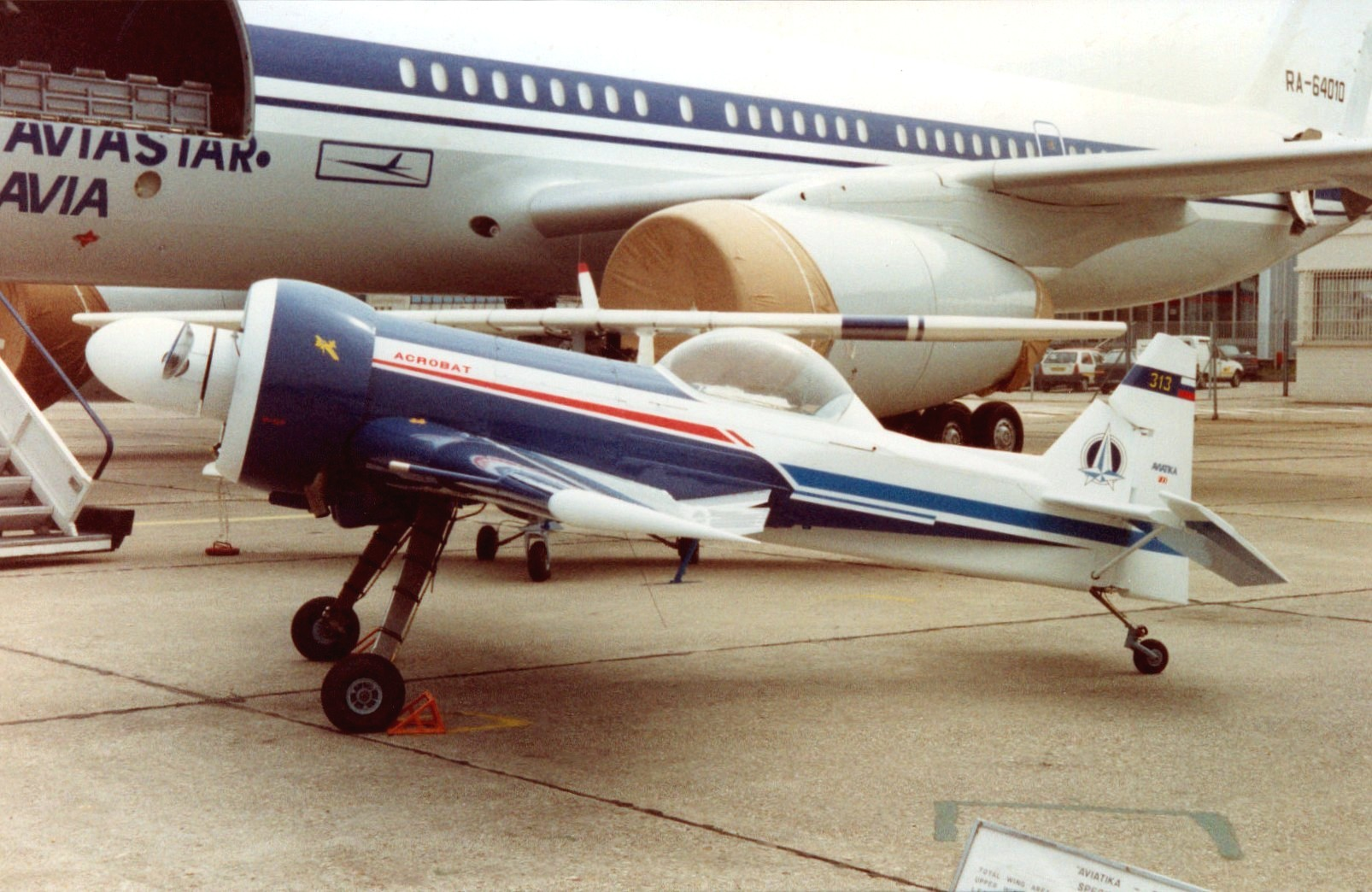
- Paris Air Show 1993

General information
- Type: Single-seat aerobatic monoplane
- National origin: Russia
- Manufacturer: Aviatika
- Number built: 1

History
- First flight: 22 February 1993

The Aviatika-900 Acrobat is a 1990s Russian single-seat aerobatic monoplane designed and built by Aviatika Joint Stock Company. The aircraft is sometimes referred to as the MAI-900 Acrobat, the Moscow Aviation Institute being one of the constitute organisations when the company was formed in 1993.

== Design and development ==
The Acrobat is an all-metal monoplane with cantilever wings and a strut-braced tailplane. It has a fixed landing gear with a steerable tailwheel and is powered by a 360 hp (268 kW) AOOT M-14P radial piston engine.

== Operational history ==
The aircraft set five FAI-accredited records. The aircraft was sold to Lithuanian aerobatic pilot Jurgis Kairys.

== Specifications ==
Data from

General characteristics

- Crew: 1
- Length: 5.7 m (18 ft 8 in)
- Wingspan: 7.15 m (23 ft 5 in)
- Height: 3.0 m (9 ft 10 in)
- Wing area: 10 m^{2} (110 sq ft)
- Aspect ratio: 5:11
- Airfoil: Symmetrical
- Empty weight: 590 kg (1,301 lb)
- Max takeoff weight: 715 kg (1,576 lb)
- Powerplant: 1 × AOOT M-14P radial piston engine, 270 kW (360 hp)

Performance

- Maximum speed: 375 km/h (233 mph, 202 kn)
- Stall speed: 107 km/h (66 mph, 58 kn)
- g limits: ±11
- Rate of climb: 23.0 m/s (4,530 ft/min)

== See also ==
Aircraft of comparable role, configuration, and era

- Sukhoi Su-29
- Yakovlev Yak-54
