= IS-4 Jastrząb =

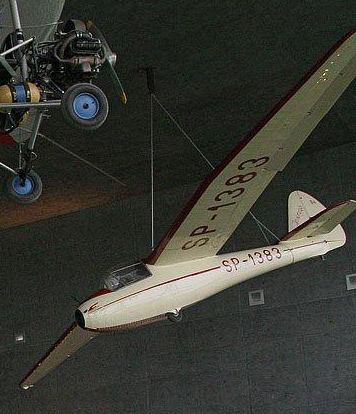

General information
- Type: Glider
- National origin: Poland
- Manufacturer: Instytut Szybownictwa
- Designer: J Niespał
- Number built: 37

History
- Introduction date: 1950
- First flight: 21 Dec 1949

The IS-4 Jastrząb (Instytut Szybownictwa – gliding institute) was a single-seat aerobatic glider designed and built in Poland from 1949.

== Development ==
The IS-4 was built for aerobatics with a high structural strength and a very high maximum speed which could not be achieved in a vertical dive. Due to the pilot's sitting position and the arrangements of the controls, it was difficult for pilots to exceed the 8g loading limit. During high speed flight it was possible for the air-brakes to be sucked out violently, so most pilots ensured that they remained closed by holding the airbrake control.

== Variants ==
- IS-4 Jastrząb – two prototypes built in 1949.
- IS-4 Jastrząb bis – Thirty-five production aircraft, three of which were exported.

== Specifications (IS-4 Jastrząb bis) ==
Data from The World's Sailplanes:Die Segelflugzeuge der Welt:Les Planeurs du Monde Volume II

General characteristics

- Crew: 1
- Length: 6.25 m (20 ft 6 in)
- Wingspan: 12 m (39 ft 4 in)
- Height: 1.3 m (4 ft 3 in) at cockpit
- Wing area: 12 m^{2} (130 sq ft)
- Aspect ratio: 12
- Airfoil: Root – NACA 2418, Tip – NACA 2412, Mid – NACA 0012
- Empty weight: 240 kg (529 lb)
- Gross weight: 357 kg (787 lb)

Performance

- Stall speed: 67 km/h (42 mph, 36 kn)
- Never exceed speed: 450 km/h (280 mph, 240 kn)
- Rough air speed max: 200 km/h (120 mph; 110 kn)
- Aerotow speed: 200 km/h (120 mph; 110 kn)
- Winch launch speed: 150 km/h (93 mph; 81 kn)
- g limits: +7 -4 at 200 km/h (120 mph; 110 kn)
- Maximum glide ratio: 20.2 at 87 km/h (54 mph; 47 kn)
- Rate of sink: 1.04 m/s (205 ft/min) at 70 km/h (43 mph; 38 kn)
- Wing loading: 29.7 kg/m^{2} (6.1 lb/sq ft)

== See also ==
Aircraft of comparable role, configuration, and era

- Vogt Lo 100
