= Renard R.34 =

R.34

General information
- Type: Military training biplane
- National origin: Belgium
- Manufacturer: Renard
- Designer: Alfred Renard
- Number built: 1

History
- First flight: 21 July 1934

The Renard R.34 was a 1930s Belgian two-seat biplane trainer designed by Alfred Renard and built by Societé Anonyme des Avions et Moteurs Renard.

== Design and development ==
The R.34 was built for a Belgian military competition in October 1933 for an aerobatic and general-purpose biplane. The R.34 was a biplane that first flew on 21 July 1934 powered by a 240 hp (179 kW) Renard 200 radial engine. It was also fitted with a 260 hp (194 kW) Armstrong Siddeley Lynx engine fitted with a Townend ring. The competition was won by the Avro Tutor and, although the R.24 was later flown in a number of military configurations, it did not enter production.

== Specifications (with Renard 200) ==
Data from Renard R.34

General characteristics

- Crew: 2
- Length: 6.90 m (22 ft 8 in)
- Wingspan: 9.20 m (30 ft 2 in)
- Height: 2.45 m (8 ft 0 in)
- Wing area: 22 m^{2} (240 sq ft)
- Empty weight: 740 kg (1,631 lb)
- Gross weight: 1,147 kg (2,529 lb)
- Powerplant: 1 × Renard 200 9-cylinder radial, 180 kW (240 hp)

Performance

- Maximum speed: 215 km/h (134 mph, 116 kn)
- Stall speed: 92 km/h (57 mph, 50 kn)
- Service ceiling: 5,500 m (18,000 ft)
- Time to altitude:
  - 7 minutes to 7,000 m (23,000 ft)
  - 17 minutes 20 sec to 4,000 m (13,000 ft)

== Bibliography ==
- Hauet, André (April 1976). "Renard R.34: L'avion d'école et d'acrobatie tous usages qui séduisit pas l'Aéronautique militaire belge" [The All-purpose Training and Acrobatic Aircraft That Did Not Appeal to the Belgian Airforce]. Le Fana de l'Aviation (in French) (77): 26–29. ISSN 0757-4169.
- The Illustrated Encyclopedia of Aircraft (Part Work 1982-1985). Orbis Publishing.
