= C. W. "Bill" Whitney =

Australian Aeronautical Engineer (born 1944)

Charles William "Bill" Whitney
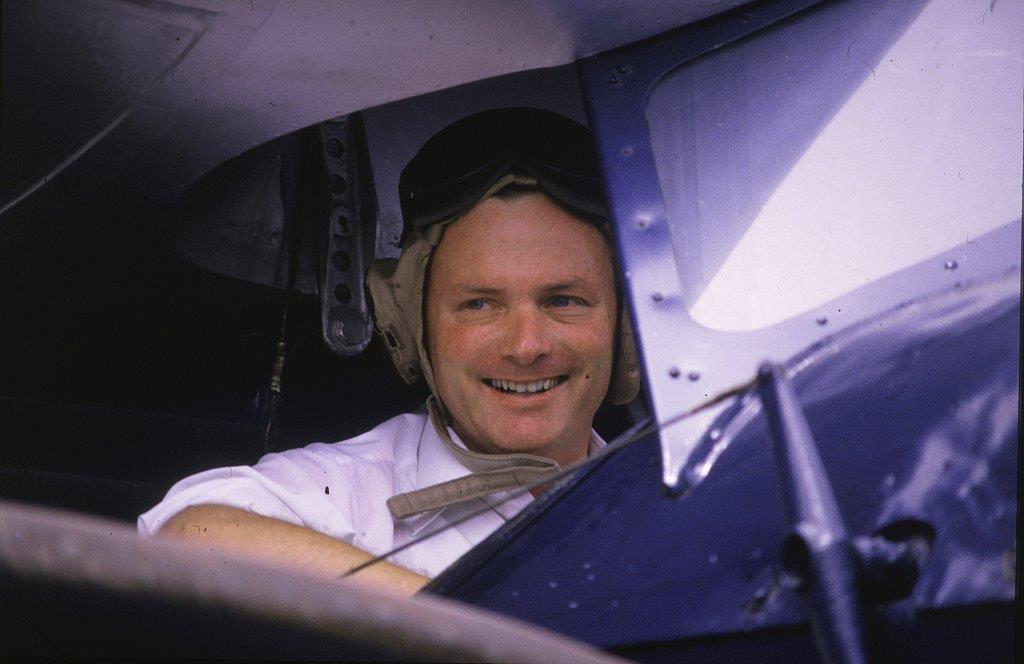
- Born: 1944 (age 81–82)
- Education: Bachelor of Engineering (Aeronautical)
- Occupation: Aeronautical Engineer
- Years active: 1967 - Present

Charles William "Bill" Whitney (born 1944) is an Australian Aeronautical Engineer who has designed numerous light, very light and replica aircraft types, as well as making a number of contributions to the development of very light / recreational aircraft and aircraft safety.

== Aircraft Designs ==
The following aircraft have been designed by C. W. Whitney during his career:

=== 1970s ===
- Aerobike - Single seat very light biplane, constructed by himself. Similar in layout to the Hovey Whing Ding, only one was made.
- Cygnet - Single seat very light monoplane with parasol wing. A small number were made by amateur builders.

=== 1980s ===
- Flying replica of the Fokker F.VIIB/3m "The Southern Cross" - Based on available drawings and inspections of the original aircraft, the replica was redesigned and drawn to comply with modern airworthiness requirements.
- Australian LightWing Model GR-532 / GR-582 / GR-912 ultralight / recreational aircraft - The original concept was proposed by Howard Hughes and it was developed into an ANO 95.25 (later CAO 101.55) approved aircraft and subsequently produced in large numbers as either ready-to-fly or in kit form. In production.
- Flying replicas of the Bristol F2b Tourer biplanes for the TV miniseries A Thousand Skies - Bristol Tourer aircraft were originally flown by Sir Charles Kingsford-Smith during his early flying for Western Australian Airways. Two replicas were built in a 14-week timeframe from "first pencil to paper to first flight".
- Wedgetail Gyroplane - Configured in a similar fashion to a traditional Juan de la Cierva gyroplane with a forward (tractor) engine and horizontal stabiliser for pitch stability.
- Aircorp Bushmaster two and four seat light aircraft - Fabric covering over welded tubular steel fuselage in a similar arrangement to an Auster Arrow or Piper Cub.

=== 1990s ===
- Seabird Seeker - An all-metal observation aircraft of unusual pusher configuration, developed and certified to FAR 23. In production.
- Flying replica of the Vickers Vimy - The replica aircraft was used to re-enact the first flights from England to Australia, England to South Africa and the US to England.
- Amethyst Falcon ultralight biplane - Plans-built single seat aircraft for basic aerobatic flying (+6G / -3G), employs sheet metal fabric covered wings with tubular steel fabric covered fuselage. Two constructed and flown to date.
- Magpie ultralight - Plans built single seat aircraft for recreational flying, uses a fabric covered wing with hoop pine structure and an extruded boom rear fuselage. One constructed and flown to date.

=== 2000s ===
- Flying replica of the Wright Flyer III - Built in Narromine NSW, it was launched at an event attended by Buzz Aldrin and subsequently made a number of short flights.
- Whitney Boomerang trainer - Designed from the outset to satisfy the requirements of general aviation flying instructors, this aircraft features an all-aluminium wing and aft fuselage, using a forward fuselage constructed of welded tubular steel for impact protection. Seats and harnesses were tested to the modern 26G forward / 19G down crashworthiness requirements of FAR 23, making it only the second Australian aircraft to achieve this goal, after the GippsAero GA-8 Airvan.
- Flying replica of the Spirit of St Louis - Completed major portions of the airframe design.
