= SP-2000 =

SP-2000 may refer to:

- Frontier SP-2000, a professional film scanner manufactured by Fujifilm
- Australian Lightwing SP-2000 Speed, Australian light aircraft
