= Australian Lightwing SP-4000 Speed =

Australian kit aircraft

General information
- Type: Light-sport aircraft
- National origin: Australia
- Manufacturer: Australian Lightwing
- Status: In production

History
- Developed from: Australian Lightwing SP-2000 Speed
- Variant: Australian Lightwing SP-6000

The Australian Lightwing SP-4000 Speed is an Australian kit aircraft, designed and produced by Australian Lightwing of Ballina, New South Wales. The aircraft is supplied as a kit for amateur construction.

== Design and development ==
The aircraft was developed from the two-seat SP-2000 Speed and features a cantilever low-wing, a four-seat enclosed cockpit, fixed tricycle landing gear and a single engine in tractor configuration.

The aircraft fuselage is made from welded steel tubing covered in non-structural fibreglass. Its 8 m (26.2 ft) span wing is built from 6061-T6 aluminum covered in doped aircraft fabric and fibreglass. Standard engines recommended are the 150 to 160 hp (112 to 119 kW) Lycoming O-320 or the 180 to 200 hp (134 to 149 kW) Lycoming O-360 four-stroke powerplants, along with similar Continental Motors, Inc. or auto-conversions. Cockpit access is via gull-winged doors on both sides. Wheel pants are usually fitted.

== Specifications (SP-4000 Speed) ==
Data from Company

General characteristics

- Crew: one
- Capacity: three passengers
- Length: 6.42 m (21 ft 1 in)
- Wingspan: 8.0 m (26 ft 3 in)
- Wing area: 11.6 m^{2} (125 sq ft)
- Airfoil: NACA 23013
- Empty weight: 600 kg (1,323 lb)
- Gross weight: 1,100 kg (2,425 lb)
- Fuel capacity: 180 litres (40 imp gal; 48 US gal)
- Powerplant: 1 × Lycoming O-360 four cylinder, air-cooled, four stroke aircraft engine, 130 kW (180 hp)

Performance

- Cruise speed: 287 km/h (178 mph, 155 kn)
- Stall speed: 102 km/h (63 mph, 55 kn) flaps down
- Range: 1,500 km (920 mi, 800 nmi)
- Endurance: 6.0
- Rate of climb: 5.1 m/s (1,000 ft/min)
