= SQ2 =

SQ2 may refer to:

- Backcountry Super Cubs Mackey SQ2, an American amateur-built aircraft design
- SQ2, a galactic quadrant in the Milky Way
- SQ2, mixtape by Lil Wayne
- Space Quest II, a video game
- Microsoft SQ2, a system on a chip
