= Brutsche Freedom 210 STOL =

Freedom 210 STOL
- Three-view drawing

General information
- Type: Homebuilt aircraft
- National origin: United States
- Manufacturer: Brutsche Aircraft
- Designer: Neal H. Brutsche
- Status: Kit production completed
- Number built: None

The Brutsche Freedom 210 STOL was a proposed American STOL homebuilt aircraft that was designed by Neal H. Brutsche and intended to be produced by Brutsche Aircraft Corporation of Salt Lake City, Utah, introduced in the mid-1990s. The aircraft was planned to be supplied as a kit for amateur construction.

== Design and development ==
The Freedom 210 STOL was to be a follow-on design to the single-seat Brutsche Freedom 40. It features a cantilever high-wing, a four-seat enclosed cabin, fixed conventional landing gear with wheel pants and a single engine in tractor configuration.

The aircraft was to be made from aluminum sheet. Its 31.0 ft (9.4 m) span wing was to mount almost full span Fowler flaps and feature a wing area of 135 sq ft (12.5 m^{2}). The cabin width was to be 43 in (110 cm), accessed via swing-up doors 53 in (135 cm) in width. The acceptable power range was to be 160 to 210 hp (119 to 157 kW) and the standard engines used are the 180 hp (134 kW) Lycoming O-360 or the 210 hp (157 kW) fuel-injected Lycoming IO-360 powerplant. Kit options included a heater, upholstery, cargo tie-downs and floats.

The aircraft was to have a typical empty weight of 1,250 lb (570 kg) and a gross weight of 2,250 lb (1,020 kg), giving a useful load of 1,000 lb (450 kg). With full fuel of 60 U.S. gallons (230 L; 50 imp gal) the payload for the pilot, passengers and baggage was to be 640 lb (290 kg).

The standard day, sea level, no wind, take off with a 210 hp (157 kW) engine was to be 425 ft (130 m) and the landing roll is 300 ft (91 m).

The manufacturer estimated the construction time from the supplied kit would be 1400 hours.

== Operational history ==
By 1998 the company reported that kits were available.

Since April 2015 no examples have been registered in the United States with the Federal Aviation Administration and it is likely that none were completed.

== Variants ==
Freedom 180 STOL
Version with 180 hp (134 kW) Lycoming O-360 engine and a length of 24.08 ft (7.3 m)
Freedom 210 STOL
Version with 210 hp (157 kW) Lycoming IO-360 engine and a length of 24.5 ft (7.5 m)

== Specifications (Freedom 210 STOL) ==
Data from AeroCrafter

General characteristics

- Crew: one
- Capacity: three passengers
- Length: 24 ft 6 in (7.47 m)
- Wingspan: 31 ft 0 in (9.45 m)
- Wing area: 135 sq ft (12.5 m^{2})
- Empty weight: 1,250 lb (567 kg)
- Gross weight: 2,250 lb (1,021 kg)
- Fuel capacity: 60 U.S. gallons (230 L; 50 imp gal)
- Powerplant: 1 × Lycoming IO-360 four cylinder, air-cooled, fuel-injected, four stroke aircraft engine, 108 hp (81 kW)

Performance

- Maximum speed: 207 mph (333 km/h, 180 kn)
- Cruise speed: 195 mph (314 km/h, 169 kn)
- Stall speed: 49 mph (79 km/h, 43 kn) flaps down
- Range: 1,290 mi (2,080 km, 1,120 nmi)
- Service ceiling: 22,000 ft (6,700 m)
- Rate of climb: 1,630 ft/min (8.3 m/s)
- Wing loading: 16.7 lb/sq ft (82 kg/m^{2})
