= Bushmaster (comics) =

Bushmaster, in comics, may refer to:

- Bushmaster (Marvel Comics), two Marvel supervillains
- Bushmaster (DC Comics), a DC Comics character

== See also ==
- Bushmaster (disambiguation)
