= Super Cub =

Super Cub may refer to:

- Backcountry Super Cubs Super Cub, an American amateur-built aircraft design
- Honda Super Cub, a light motorcycle, and the most produced motor vehicle in history
- Piper PA-18 Super Cub, an American light aircraft design
- Super Cub, a Japanese light novel, manga, and anime series
