= Bushmasters =

Bushmasters may refer to:

- Lachesis (genus), a genus of venomous pit vipers found in forested areas of Central and South America
- 158th Infantry Regiment (United States), of the Arizona Army National Guard, nicknamed the "Bushmasters"

== See also ==
- Bushmaster (disambiguation)
