= Peña Dahu =

French homebuilt aircraft

Dahu

General information
- Type: Amateur-built aircraft
- National origin: France
- Designer: Louis Peña
- Status: Plans available (2012)

History
- First flight: 9 May 1996

The Peña Dahu, named for the legendary French mountain animal, is a French amateur-built aircraft that was designed by Louis Peña of Dax, Landes and made available in the form of plans for amateur construction.

== Design and development ==
The Dahu is intended for mountain flying, aero-towing gliders and touring. It features a cantilever low-wing, a four-seat enclosed cockpit, fixed conventional landing gear and a single engine in tractor configuration.

The Dahu is made from wood. Its 9 m (29.5 ft) span wing has an area of 15 m^{2} (160 sq ft) and mounts flaps. The recommended engines range in power from 120 to 200 hp (89 to 149 kW) and include the 160 hp (119 kW) Lycoming O-320, 180 hp (134 kW) Lycoming O-360 and the fuel-injected 200 hp (149 kW) Lycoming IO-360 four-stroke powerplants. When equipped with a 120 hp (89 kW) engine the gross weight is limited to 900 kg (1,984 lb) instead of 1,200 kg (2,646 lb).

Reviewers Roy Beisswenger and Marino Boric described the design in a 2015 review as "unashamedly rustic".

== Specifications (Dahu) ==
Data from Bayerl and Tacke

General characteristics

- Crew: one
- Capacity: three passengers
- Wingspan: 9 m (29 ft 6 in)
- Wing area: 15 m^{2} (160 sq ft)
- Empty weight: 600 kg (1,323 lb)
- Gross weight: 1,200 kg (2,646 lb) 900 kg (1,984 lb) when equipped with a 120 hp (89 kW) engine
- Fuel capacity: 200 litres (44 imp gal; 53 US gal)
- Powerplant: 1 × Lycoming O-360 four cylinder, air-cooled, four stroke aircraft engine, 130 kW (180 hp)
- Propellers: 2-bladed metal constant speed propeller

Performance

- Maximum speed: 310 km/h (190 mph, 170 kn)
- Cruise speed: 230 km/h (140 mph, 120 kn)
- Stall speed: 80 km/h (50 mph, 43 kn)
- Rate of climb: 6 m/s (1,200 ft/min)
- Wing loading: 80.0 kg/m^{2} (16.4 lb/sq ft)
