= Backcountry Super Cubs =

American homebuilt aircraft manufacturer

Backcountry Super Cubs LLC
- Company type: Privately held company
- Industry: Aerospace
- Founded: 1998
- Headquarters: United States
- Key people: Manager: Bob Lutz
- Products: Kit aircraft
- Owner: Bruce Reed, Jason Sanchez and Joe Trujillo
- Website: www.supercub.com

Backcountry Super Cubs LLC is an American aircraft manufacturer based in Douglas, Wyoming. The company specializes in the design and manufacture of bush aircraft in the form of kits for amateur construction.

== Personnel ==
The company is owned by Bruce Reed, Jason Sanchez and Joe Trujillo. The manager is Bob Lutz.

== History ==
The company was founded in 1998 as Smith Aviation, near London, Ontario, Canada producing kit aircraft. In January 2006, Smith Aviation was sold and moved to Wyoming, United States and the name was changed to Turbine Cubs of Wyoming, LLC. In 2009 the name was changed to Backcountry Super Cubs LLC, reflecting the lack of suitable turbine engines available for the aircraft.

Wayne Mackey of Miles City, Montana designed the Backcountry Super Cubs Mackey SQ2 in 2008. Being an experienced Piper PA-18 Super Cub operator Mackey incorporated dozens of changes into the original Piper design to produce the new model.

== Aircraft ==
Summary of aircraft built by Backcountry Super Cubs
Model name	First flight	Number built	Type
Backcountry Super Cubs Supercruiser		140 (2011)	Two-seat bush aircraft
Backcountry Super Cubs Super Cub		138 (2011)	Two-seat bush aircraft
Backcountry Super Cubs Mackey SQ2		7 (2011)	Two-seat bush aircraft
Backcountry Super Cubs BOSS			Four-seat bush aircraft
Backcountry Super Cubs Outlaw LSA			Two-seat light-sport aircraft
