= Aero Concepts Discovery =

American aircraft propeller manufacturer

Discovery

General information
- Type: Amateur-built aircraft
- National origin: United States
- Manufacturer: Aero Concepts
- Designer: Martin Hollmann
- Status: In production (2011)
- Number built: 3

History
- Introduction date: mid-1990s

The Aero Concepts Discovery is an American amateur-built aircraft, produced by Aero Concepts of Florida. The aircraft is supplied as a kit for amateur construction.

== Design and development ==
The Discovery is a three lifting surface aircraft that features a cantilever mid-wing, a twin boom high tail, a canard surface, a two-seats-in-side-by-side configuration enclosed cockpit, fixed tricycle landing gear and a single engine in pusher configuration.

The aircraft is made from composites. Its 30 ft (9.1 m) span wing employs a NASA NLF-0215 airfoil and has an area of 125 sq ft (11.6 m^{2}). The canard uses the same airfoil, while the tailplane uses a NASA 63218. The aircraft's recommended engine power range is 160 to 230 hp (119 to 172 kW) and standard engines used include the 180 hp (134 kW) Lycoming O-360 four-stroke powerplant. Construction time from the supplied kit is 1200 hours.

The company plans to develop the design into a light-sport aircraft, a jet-powered version and four-seat variant as well.

== Operational history ==
By the end of 2011 three examples had been reported as completed and flown.

== Specifications (Discovery) ==
Data from Kitplanes

General characteristics

- Crew: one
- Capacity: one passenger
- Length: 17.9 ft (5.5 m)
- Wingspan: 30 ft (9.1 m)
- Wing area: 125 sq ft (11.6 m^{2})
- Empty weight: 860 lb (390 kg)
- Gross weight: 1,620 lb (735 kg)
- Fuel capacity: 30 U.S. gallons (110 L; 25 imp gal)
- Powerplant: 1 × Lycoming O-360 four cylinder, air-cooled, four stroke aircraft engine, 180 hp (130 kW)

Performance

- Cruise speed: 225 mph (362 km/h, 196 kn)
- Stall speed: 58 mph (93 km/h, 50 kn)
- Range: 650 mi (1,050 km, 560 nmi)
- Rate of climb: 2,300 ft/min (12 m/s)
- Wing loading: 13.0 lb/sq ft (63 kg/m^{2})
