= Norton NR642 =

British wankel engine for aircraft

NR642
- Type: Aircraft engine
- National origin: United Kingdom
- Manufacturer: Norton Motorcycle Company

The Norton NR642 (Originally the Aerotor 90) is a British aircraft engine that was designed and produced by Norton Motorcycle Company in the 1990s for use in light aircraft (particularly by amateur constructors) and UAVs.

== Design and development ==
The NR642 is a twin-rotor KKM-type Wankel engine. It is a 588 cc (35.9 cu in) displacement petrol engine design, with a heavy-duty 2.94:1 reduction gearbox. Cooling is provided by a fan for the rotors, plus liquid cooling for the housing. It was designed to meet JAR-E and FAR 23 regulatory requirements. Norton aimed for 1,500 hours running time between overhauls but was initially specifying 200-300 hours.

The NR642 first flew in late 1989, with two units installed on a Rutan Long-EZ to create what its builder called a "Twin EZ".

== Applications ==
- Aircorp Bushmaster
- Rutan Long-EZ

== Specifications ==
Data from Lambert 1991, p.709

=== General characteristics ===
- Type: Two rotor Wankel aircraft engine
- Displacement: 588 cc (35.9 cu in)
- Length: 702 mm (27.6 in)
- Width: 457 mm (18.0 in)
- Height: 444 mm (17.5 in)
- Dry weight: 64 kg (141.1 lb)

=== Components ===
- Fuel type: petrol
- Cooling system: air-cooled rotors, liquid-cooled housing
- Reduction gear: 2.94:1

=== Performance ===
- Power output: 90 hp (67 kW)
- Fuel consumption: 5.2 US gal (19.7 L)/hour
- Specific fuel consumption: 0.50 lb (0.2 kg)/hp at 70% power
  0.55 lb (0.2 kg)/hp at full power

== See also ==
Related lists

- List of aircraft engines
