= Bushmaster =

Bushmaster may refer to:

== Snakes ==
- Any member of the genus Lachesis (genus), large venomous pit vipers of Central and South America

== Military and firearms ==
- Bushmaster Firearms International, an American firearms manufacturer
  - Bushmaster Arm Pistol, a 5.56×45mm NATO weapon classified as either a long pistol or short rifle
  - Bushmaster M17S, a semi-automatic bullpup rifle
  - Bushmaster ACR, an assault rifle originally designed by Magpul
  - Bushmaster XM-15, a line of AR-15 pattern rifles and carbines
  - Bushmaster M4-type Carbine, a carbine in the XM-15 family
  - .450 Bushmaster, a rifle cartridge originally developed by LeMAG Firearms LLC
- Bushmaster Protected Mobility Vehicle, an Australian infantry mobility vehicle
- During World War II, the 158th Infantry Regiment of the Arizona Army National Guard were nicknamed the "Bushmasters"
- A variant of the Landing Vehicle Tracked (LVT)
- M242 Bushmaster, a 25mm chain gun manufactured by Alliant Techsystems
  - Mk44 Bushmaster II, a 30mm chain gun derived from the M242
  - Bushmaster III, a 35mm chain gun derived from the M242
  - Bushmaster IV, a 40mm chain gun derived from the M242

== Entertainment ==
- Bushmaster (DC Comics), a DC Comics superhero
- Bushmaster (Marvel Comics), the codename for two Marvel Comics supervillains
- Ally/Bushmaster, a minor character in season 2 of the Amazon Prime show Gen V

== Aircraft ==
- Aircorp Bushmaster, a prototype Australian light utility aircraft of the 1990s
- Alaskan Bushmaster, a light utility aircraft for amateur construction
- Stout Bushmaster 2000 (a development of the Ford Trimotor), a small commuter airliner
- a modified Piper PA-22 Tri-Pacer airplane with lengthened wings, fuselage and more powerful engine

== See also ==
- Bushmasters (disambiguation)
