= Dream Tundra =

Tundra
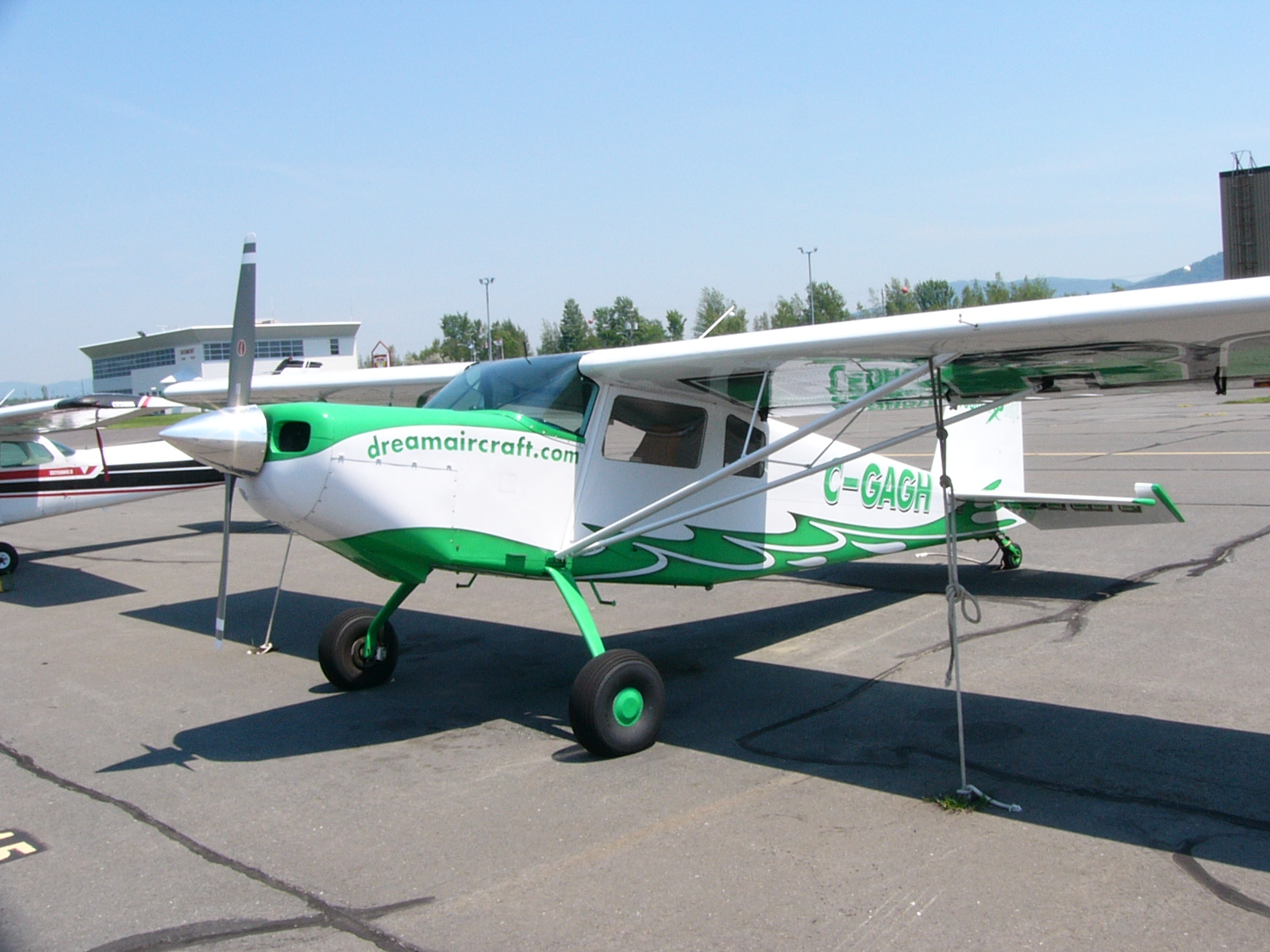
- Prototype Dream Tundra 200

General information
- Type: 4 seat kit built STOL utility aircraft
- National origin: Canada
- Manufacturer: Dream Aircraft Inc, Quebec
- Number built: 15 (2011)

History
- First flight: 12 May 2001

The Dream Tundra is a single-engine, high-wing monoplane designed in Canada. Seating four, its short takeoff and landing characteristics can be adapted to land, snow, or water use. It is produced as a kit for homebuilding.

== Design and development ==
The Tundra, Dream Aircraft's first and only product to date, is a kit-built aircraft designed for robustness and STOL performance, seating four in two side-by-side rows. It is almost entirely of riveted aluminium construction, though flying surface tips are composite, and is laid out in conventional high-wing, single-engine, form. The kit parts are made by CNC-machining.

The wing has constant chord, turned-down tips and 2° of washout. It is braced by pairs of V-struts attached to the lower fuselage longerons forward of the cabin. Four-position Fowler flaps are fitted. The tailplane and elevators are rectangular in plan, with a cutout in the latter to allow rudder movement. Fin and rudder are likewise rectangular apart from the leading edge, which has a curved fillet. Both rudder and elevators are horn balanced.

Behind the engine the cabin, under the wing, is accessed via top hinged doors on both sides. There is a separate, port side door for baggage. The flat sides of the fuselage taper to the tail. Several undercarriage configurations are available; for land based operations the Tundra builder can choose between tricycle and tailwheel gear. Both use spring cantilever main legs, with large, low pressure tires for work off soft ground; these legs are positioned at the attachment point of the wing struts for the conventional arrangement and further aft for the tricycle gear. Floats can also be fitted, with their main attachment at the base of the struts and with secondary float struts further aft. Amphibious floats (Montana 2800) may be used. The Tundra may also be equipped with skis. Takeoff roll distances with wheels, skis, and floats are respectively 125 m, 200 m, and 400 m (400 ft, 650 ft, and 1300 ft).

The first Tundra flew on 12 May 2001, powered by a 134 kW (180 hp) Textron Lycoming O-360-A flat four engine. Later Tundras have used either the 150 kW (200 hp) Textron Lycoming IO-360 flat four or the 175 kW (235 hp) Textron Lycoming O-540-B4B5 flat six. Other alterations were made to the later aircraft, principally to the undercarriage (the prototype had wheels mounted on faired V-struts with bungee sprung half-axles), to the cabin doors for ease of access, to the tailplane and fin for ease of building and by the addition of a double cabin floor for better sound insulation.

The kit manufacturer estimates the construction time at 1000 hours.

== Operational history ==
By August 2009 35 kits had been sold, with 11 Tundras flying. About 23 have the tailwheel undercarriage and most, apart from the second prototype C-GAGH, retain the curved fin fillet of the first prototype C-GIPN.

== Variants ==
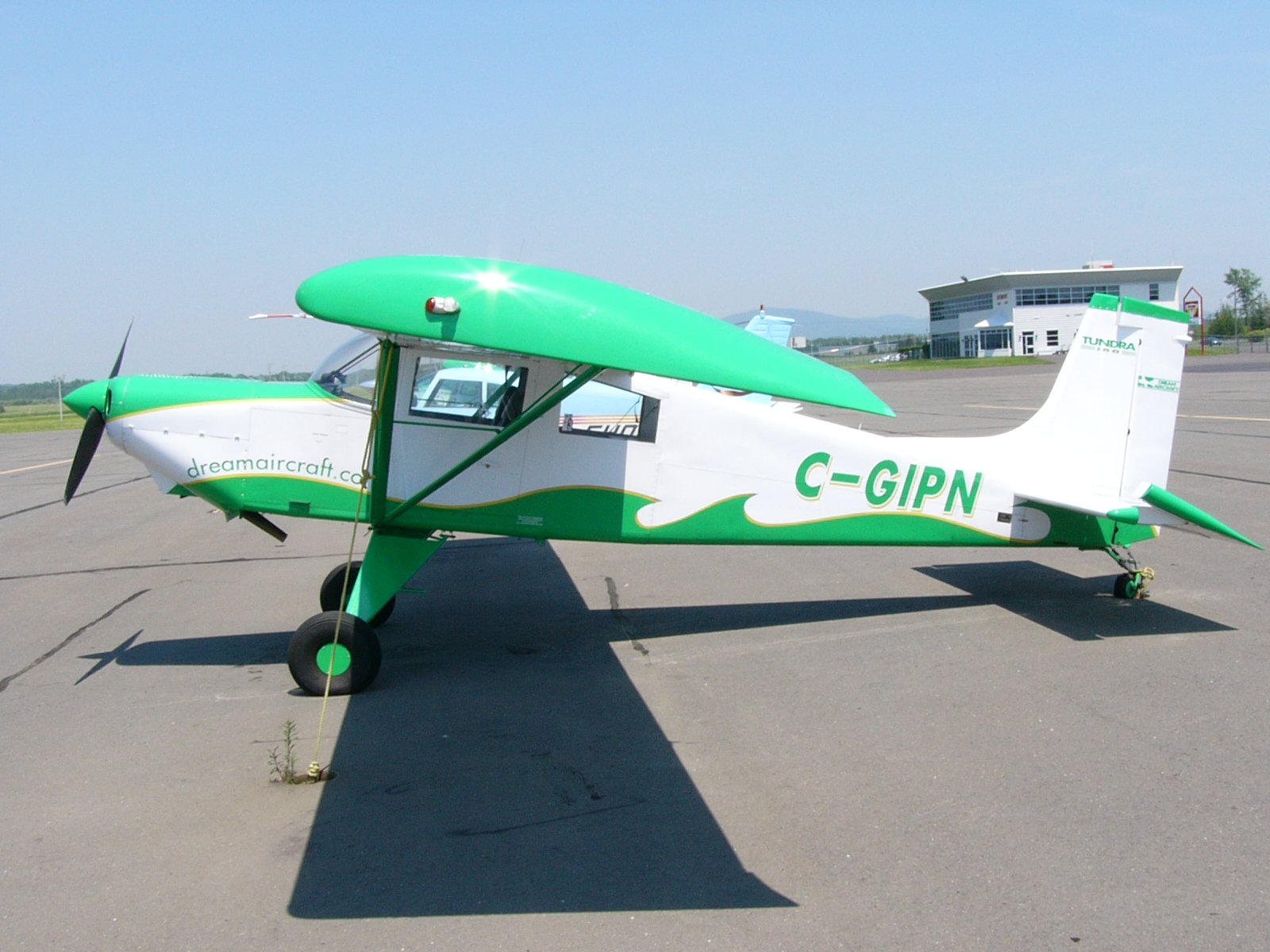
Prototype Dream Tundra 180

Tundra 180
Initial version with bungee main landing gear suspension and powered by a 134 kW (180 hp) Textron Lycoming O-360-A engine.
Tundra 200
Later version with sprung steel main landing gear and powered by a 150 kW (200 hp) Textron Lycoming IO-360 engine.

== Specifications (landplane, 200 hp) ==
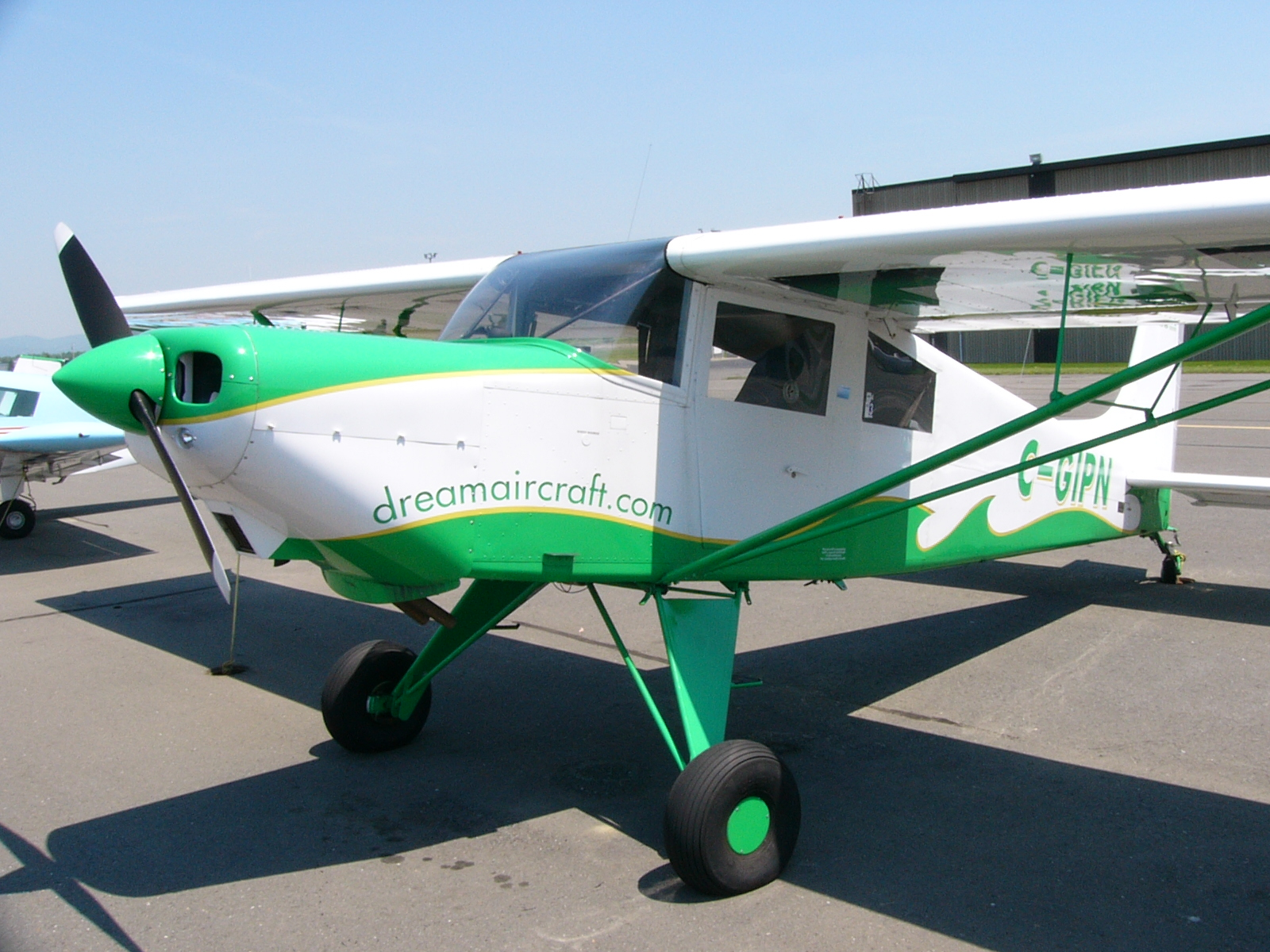
Prototype Dream Tundra 180

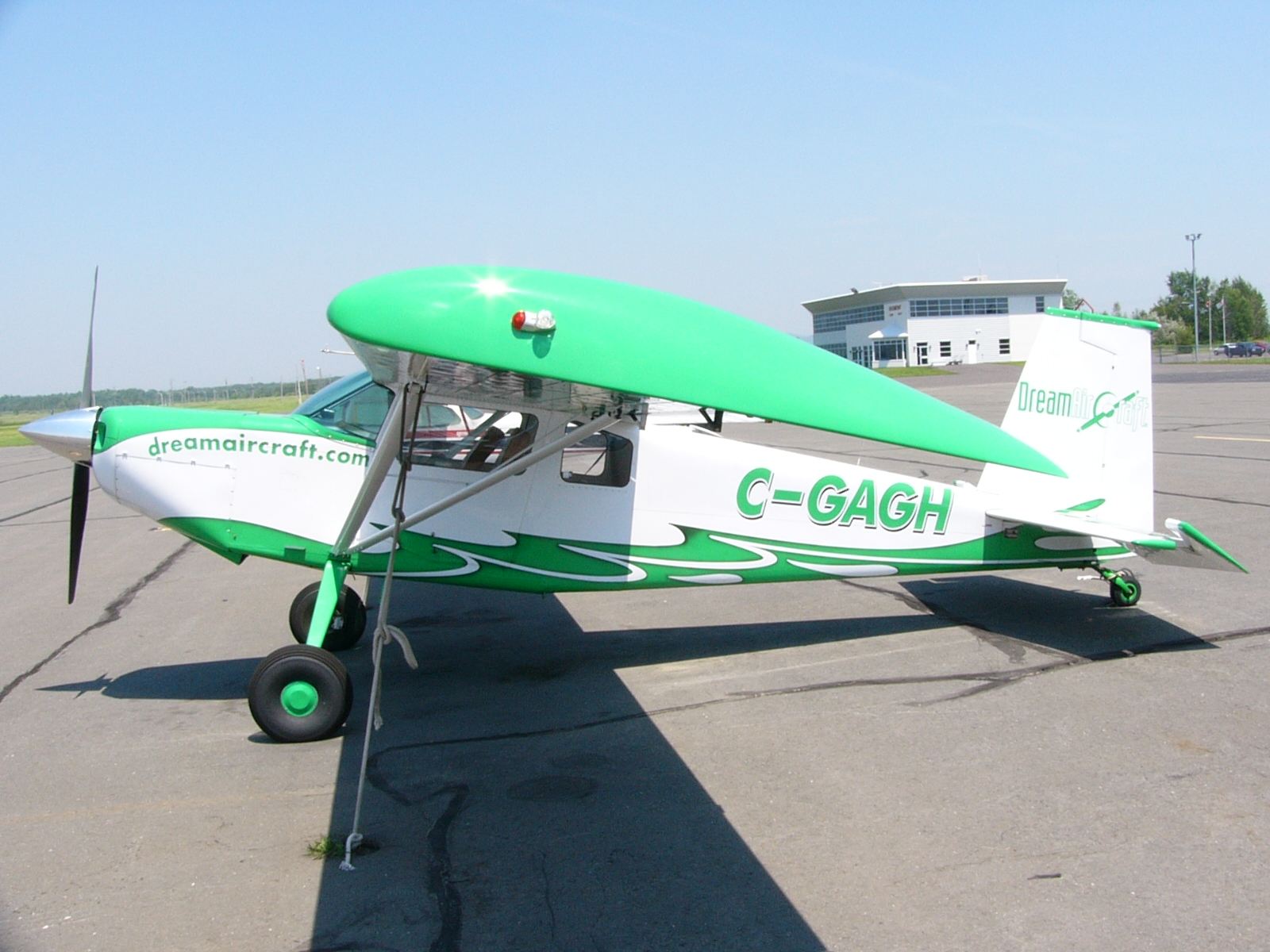
Prototype Dream Tundra 200

Data from Jane's All the World's Aircraft 2010/11

General characteristics

- Capacity: 4
- Length: 7.77 m (25 ft 6 in)
- Wingspan: 10.97 m (36 ft 0 in)
- Height: 2.13 m (7 ft 0 in)
- Wing area: 17.06 m^{2} (183.6 sq ft) gross
- Airfoil: modified Riblett 660.15
- Empty weight: 658 kg (1,451 lb)
- Max takeoff weight: 1,156 kg (2,549 lb)
- Powerplant: 1 × Textron Lycoming IO-360 flat four cylinder, 149 kW (200 hp)
- Propellers: 2-bladed Hartzell metal, 2.06 m (6 ft 9 in) diameter

Performance

- Cruise speed: 213 km/h (132 mph, 115 kn) at 75% power
- Stall speed: 49 km/h (30 mph, 26 kn) flaps down
- Never exceed speed: 259 km/h (161 mph, 140 kn)
- Range: 1,083 km (673 mi, 585 nmi)
- Endurance: 5 hr 12 min
- Service ceiling: 4,265 m (13,993 ft) service
- g limits: +3.8/-1.7
- Rate of climb: 5.1 m/s (1,000 ft/min) at sea level
