= Lucas L8 =

French homebuilt aircraft

L8

General information
- Type: Amateur-built aircraft
- National origin: France
- Designer: Emile Lucas
- Status: Plans available (2015)

The Lucas L8, also called the L 8 and L-8, is a French amateur-built aircraft that was designed by Emile Lucas of Lagny-le-Sec. The aircraft is supplied in the form of plans for amateur construction.

== Design and development ==
The L8 is the most popular Lucas design. It features a cantilever low-wing, a two-seats-in-side-by-side configuration enclosed cockpit under a bubble canopy, fixed or optionally retractable tricycle landing gear and a single engine in tractor configuration.

The aircraft is made from sheet aluminum. Its 8 m (26.2 ft) span wing has an area of 10 m^{2} (110 sq ft) and flaps. The standard engine used is the 180 hp (134 kW) Lycoming O-360 four-stroke powerplant which provides a cruise speed of 260 km/h (160 mph) for the retractable gear model.

== Specifications (L8 retractable) ==
Data from Bayerl and Tacke

General characteristics

- Crew: one
- Capacity: one passenger
- Wingspan: 8 m (26 ft 3 in)
- Wing area: 10 m^{2} (110 sq ft)
- Empty weight: 510 kg (1,124 lb)
- Gross weight: 850 kg (1,874 lb)
- Fuel capacity: 140 litres (31 imp gal; 37 US gal)
- Powerplant: 1 × Lycoming O-360 four cylinder, air-cooled, four stroke aircraft engine, 130 kW (180 hp)
- Propellers: 2-bladed constant speed propeller

Performance

- Maximum speed: 290 km/h (180 mph, 160 kn)
- Cruise speed: 260 km/h (160 mph, 140 kn)
- Stall speed: 100 km/h (62 mph, 54 kn)
- Rate of climb: 7 m/s (1,400 ft/min)
- Wing loading: 85.0 kg/m^{2} (17.4 lb/sq ft)
