= Peña Capeña =

French homebuilt aircraft

Capeña

General information
- Type: Aerobatic amateur-built aircraft
- National origin: France
- Designer: Louis Peña
- Status: Plans available (2012)

History
- First flight: 24 July 1984
- Variant: Peña Bilouis

The Peña Capeña is a French aerobatic amateur-built aircraft that was designed by competitive aerobatic pilot Louis Peña of Dax, Landes and made available in the form of plans for amateur construction.

== Design and development ==
The Capeña features a cantilever low-wing, a single seat enclosed cockpit under a bubble canopy, fixed conventional landing gear and a single engine in tractor configuration.

The Capeña is made from wood. Its 6.8 m (22.3 ft) span wing has an area of 7.65 m^{2} (82.3 sq ft) and mounts flaps. The standard recommended engines is the 180 to 200 hp (134 to 149 kW) Lycoming AEIO-360 four-stroke powerplant.

The aircraft was later developed into the two seat Peña Bilouis.

== Specifications (Capeña) ==
Data from Bayerl and Tacke

General characteristics

- Crew: one
- Wingspan: 6.8 m (22 ft 4 in)
- Wing area: 7.65 m^{2} (82.3 sq ft)
- Empty weight: 440 kg (970 lb)
- Gross weight: 580 kg (1,279 lb)
- Fuel capacity: 85 litres (19 imp gal; 22 US gal) in two tanks of 40 litres (8.8 imp gal; 11 US gal) and 45 litres (9.9 imp gal; 12 US gal)
- Powerplant: 1 × Lycoming AEIO-360 four cylinder, air-cooled, four stroke aircraft engine, 150 kW (200 hp)
- Propellers: 2-bladed metal constant speed propeller

Performance

- Maximum speed: 325 km/h (202 mph, 175 kn)
- Cruise speed: 280 km/h (170 mph, 150 kn)
- Stall speed: 85 km/h (53 mph, 46 kn)
- Rate of climb: 15 m/s (3,000 ft/min)
- Wing loading: 75.8 kg/m^{2} (15.5 lb/sq ft)
