= Brutsche Aircraft Corporation =

American homebuilt aircraft manufacturer

- Company type: Privately held company
- Industry: Aerospace
- Founded: 21 March 1985
- Founder: Neal H. Brutsche
- Fate: Out of business
- Headquarters: Salt Lake City, Utah, United States
- Products: Kit aircraft

Brutsche Aircraft Corporation was an American aircraft manufacturer, founded in 1985 by Neal H. Brutsche and based in Salt Lake City, Utah. The company specialized in the design and manufacture of light aircraft in the form of plans and kits for amateur construction.

The company was registered on 21 March 1985 and went out of business early in the 21st century.

The company produced a series of all-metal light aircraft, including the Brutsche Freedom 40 single-seater and at least two four seat designs, the Brutsche Freedom 180 STOL and Brutsche Freedom 210 STOL. The Freedom series of aircraft are all numbered after their engine horsepower.

In April 2015 no examples of any Brutsche designs were registered in the United States with the Federal Aviation Administration, and it is likely that none exist anymore.

== Aircraft ==
Summary of aircraft built by Brutsche Aircraft Corporation
Model name	First flight	Number built	Type
Brutsche Freedom 40		Probably just one	Single-seat light aircraft
Brutsche Freedom 180 STOL		none	Four-seat light STOL aircraft
Brutsche Freedom 210 STOL		none	Four-seat light STOL aircraft
