= AeroCad AeroCanard =

Family of American amateur-built aircraft

AeroCanard
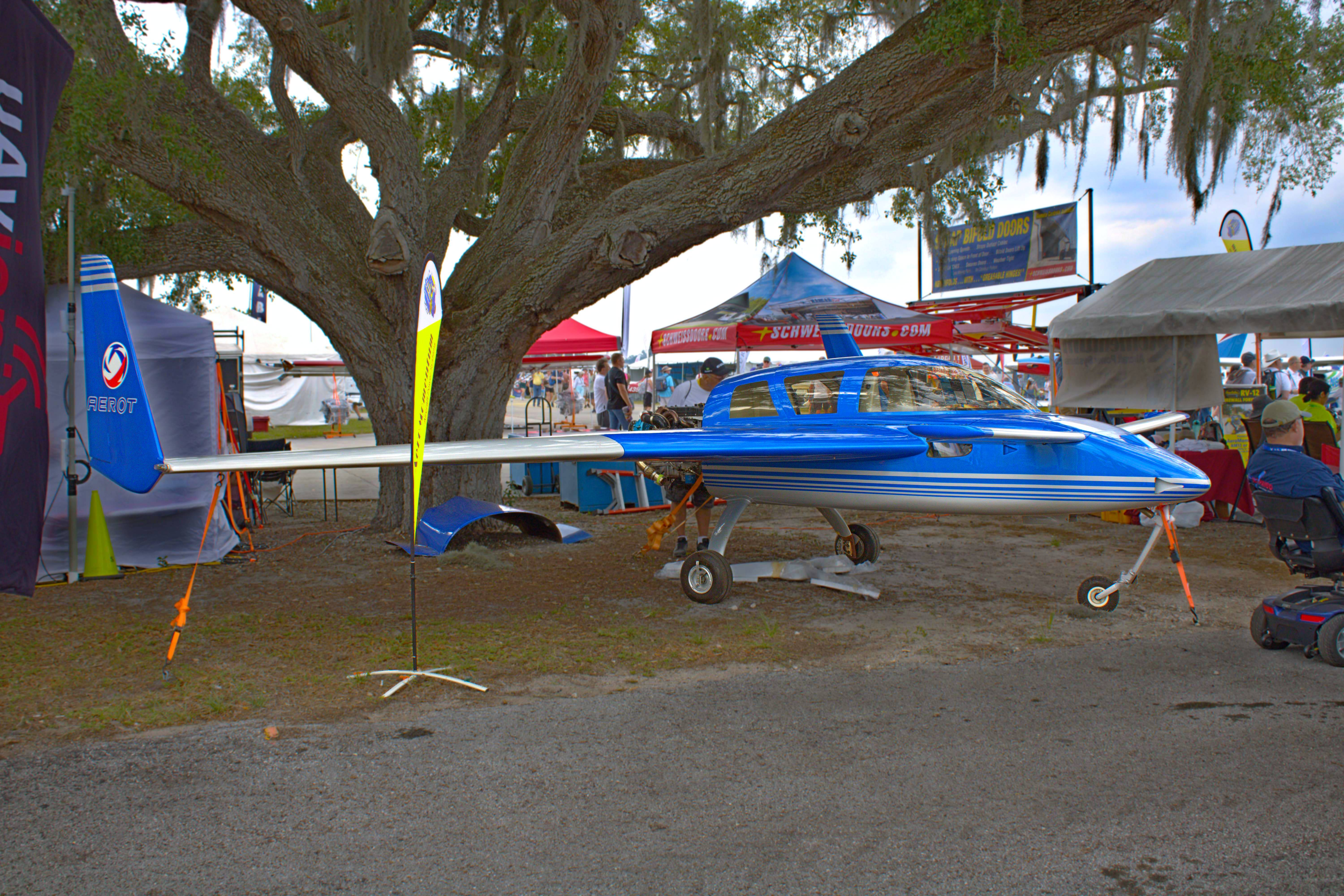
- AeroCanard FG at 2024 Sun 'n Fun

General information
- Type: Amateur-built aircraft
- National origin: United States
- Manufacturer: AeroCad
- Status: In production (2012)
- Number built: 24

The AeroCad AeroCanard is a family of American amateur-built aircraft, designed and produced by AeroCad of Florissant, Missouri. The aircraft is supplied as a kit for amateur construction.

== Design and development ==
The AeroCanard line of aircraft all feature a cantilever mid-wing, a canard tail, a four seat enclosed cabin and a single engine in pusher configuration. The tricycle landing gear features either fixed main wheels and a retractable nose wheel or fully retractable gear, depending on the model.

The aircraft is made from composites. Its 28.1 ft (8.6 m) span wing has an area of 102.3 sq ft (9.50 m^{2}). The aircraft's recommended engine power range is 160 to 200 hp (119 to 149 kW) with the standard engine used the 200 hp (149 kW) Lycoming IO-360 four-stroke powerplant.

== Operational history ==
By October 2012 four examples had been registered in the United States with the Federal Aviation Administration.

== Variants ==
AeroCanard FG
Version with fixed main landing gear and retractable nose wheel. The estimated time to build this model is 1400 hours. Eighteen had been reported as completed and flown by the end of 2011.
AeroCanard RG
Version with fully retractable landing gear. The estimated time to build this model is 1700 hours. Three had been reported as completed and flown by the end of 2011.
AeroCanard SB
Version with fixed main landing gear, retractable nose wheel with a "smaller body" width at the front seats. The estimated time to build this model is 1500 hours. Two had been reported as completed and flown by the end of 2011.
AeroCanard SX
Version with fixed main landing gear and retractable nose wheel. The estimated time to build this model is 1400 hours. One had been reported as completed and flown by the end of 2011.

== Specifications (AeroCanard RG) ==
Data from Kitplanes

General characteristics

- Crew: one
- Capacity: three passengers
- Length: 16.8 ft (5.1 m)
- Wingspan: 28.1 ft (8.6 m)
- Wing area: 102.3 sq ft (9.50 m^{2})
- Empty weight: 1,300 lb (590 kg)
- Gross weight: 2,150 lb (975 kg)
- Fuel capacity: 50 U.S. gallons (190 L; 42 imp gal)
- Powerplant: 1 × Lycoming IO-360 four cylinder, air-cooled, fuel injected, four stroke aircraft engine, 200 hp (150 kW)
- Propellers: 3-bladed constant speed propeller

Performance

- Cruise speed: 210 mph (340 km/h, 180 kn)
- Stall speed: 78 mph (126 km/h, 68 kn)
- Range: 1,000 mi (1,600 km, 870 nmi)
- Rate of climb: 1,900 ft/min (9.7 m/s)
- Wing loading: 21.0 lb/sq ft (103 kg/m^{2})
