= Sawyer Skyjacker II =

American homebuilt low-aspect-ratio research aircraft

Skyjacker II
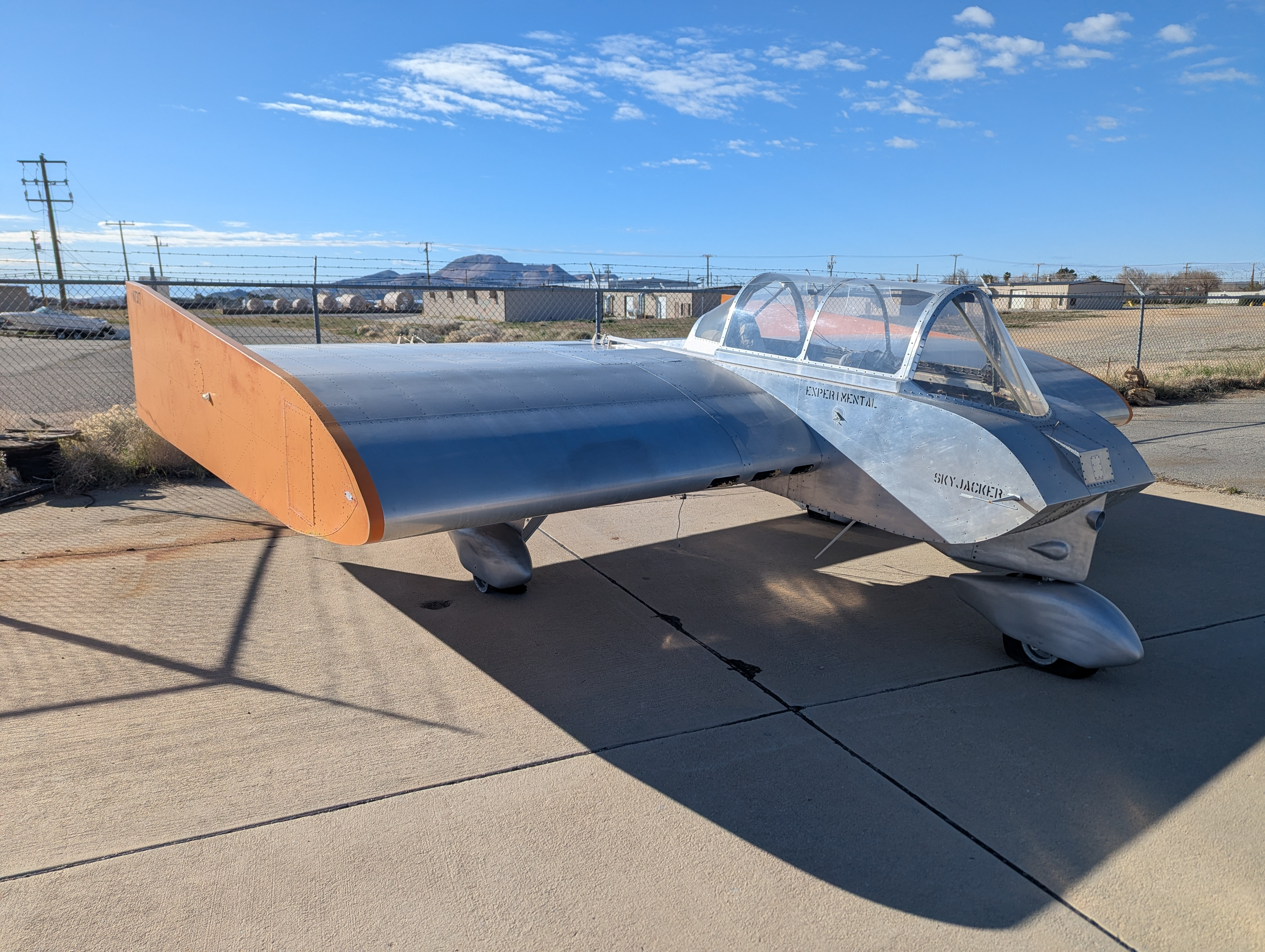
- Sawyer Skyjacker II on static display at Mojave Air and Space Port, California

General information
- Type: Experimental homebuilt aircraft
- National origin: United States
- Designer: Ralph V. "Buzz" Sawyer
- Built by: Ralph V. Sawyer
- Status: On static display
- Number built: 1
- Construction number: 001
- Registration: N7317 (cancelled 2013)

History
- Manufactured: 1974
- First flight: July 3, 1975
- Developed from: Sawyer Skyjacker I
- Preserved at: On static display at Mojave Air and Space Port

The Sawyer Skyjacker II is a unique American homebuilt aircraft designed and constructed by Ralph V. "Buzz" Sawyer of Lancaster, California, in 1974 as an experimental research vehicle to explore ultra-low aspect ratio wing configurations and lifting-body principles. It first flew on July 3, 1975, at Mojave Air and Space Port (then Mojave Airport) and was featured on the cover of the April 1978 issue of Popular Science magazine. Only one example was built. Following Sawyer's death, the aircraft was donated in late 2024 to Mojave Air and Space Port, where it is now preserved on static display.

Sawyer, a technician at NASA's Dryden Flight Research Center (now Armstrong Flight Research Center) at Edwards Air Force Base, drew inspiration from lifting-body research that contributed to Space Shuttle development. The design aimed to demonstrate inherent stability, controllability, stall/spin resistance, and scalability of ultra-low aspect ratio (≈1:1) configurations, potentially allowing greater payload capacity for a given span.

== Design and development ==
=== Origins and research goals ===
Ralph V. Sawyer initiated the Skyjacker II as a personal research project to investigate ultra-low aspect ratio wings (approximately 1:1, near-square planform) for superior low-speed stability, short takeoff and landing (STOL) performance, and inherent safety without traditional tails or rudders. Influenced by 1970s experimental aviation trends and his NASA lifting-body experience, Sawyer hypothesized that such wings could generate vortex lift for benign stall behavior ("mushing" descent instead of abrupt drop) and eliminate spin risks. The design emphasized simplicity—no compound curves, highly stressed components, or complex controls—to enable easy, low-cost construction and scalability to larger aircraft.

Development began with subscale models: a 12-inch cardboard glider and a six-foot radio-controlled twin-engine version that flew "extremely fast and well." A proposed larger variant (36-foot span, twin turboprops, four seats) was started but abandoned.

=== Construction and initial testing ===
Built at Mojave Airport by Sawyer and business partner Mike Carmack, the all-metal prototype (N7317) featured straightforward sheet aluminum fabrication. It used a 200 hp (149 kW) Lycoming IO-360-A1B6D pusher engine, initially with a two-blade propeller later upgraded to a three-blade constant-speed unit for slight thrust improvement.

Ground tests confirmed structural integrity before the maiden flight on July 3, 1975. Limited flights (only by Sawyer and Carmack) validated low-speed handling but showed marginal climb (≈250 ft/min observed in some tests, though published as 400 ft/min). The aircraft flew at high angles of attack, appearing "on the ragged edge of a stall" but remaining stall- and spin-proof, mushing downward controllably. Funding constraints limited further testing.

== Design features ==
=== Airframe configuration ===
The Skyjacker II employs a blended lifting-body/flying-wing layout with ultra-low aspect ratio wings integrated into a broad fuselage for distributed lift. It is tailless, relying on 14-foot wingtip end plates (painted orange) with yaw control surfaces for directional stability and to trap airflow, enhancing lift. Control comes from trailing-edge ailerons for roll and end-plate rudders for yaw; no conventional empennage is needed.

The two-seat cockpit (side-by-side or tandem; sources vary but forum discussions suggest side-by-side potential) is fully enclosed under a large Plexiglas canopy for visibility. Fixed tricycle landing gear with wheel pants supports STOL operations. The pusher propeller (positioned to blow over the center section) improves low-speed lift via accelerated airflow.

=== Aerodynamic innovations ===
The near-rectangular planform reduces gust sensitivity and provides forgiving low-speed behavior via vortex lift, contrasting high-aspect-ratio designs. This yields inherent stall/spin resistance and high-angle-of-attack capability, though at the cost of higher cruise drag. Sawyer claimed it as the only "true lifting body" homebuilt of its era, with potential for 4.5× payload vs. conventional aircraft of equal span.

== Operational history ==
Flight testing in the mid-1970s was brief due to limited resources. The aircraft accumulated low hours before storage. Registration N7317 was cancelled in August 2013.

In December 2024, owner Kay Carmack donated it "free and clear" to Mojave Air and Space Port (accepted December 17, 2024). It now sits in the General Aviation area, with plans for historic display (possibly Legacy Park). Observers like Cathy Hansen recalled its "terrifying" appearance in flight but recognized its historical value.

== Specifications (Skyjacker II) ==
Data from Plane and Pilot, 1978. p. 152

General characteristics

- Crew: 1
- Capacity: 1 passenger
- Length: 18 ft 0 in (5.49 m)
- Wingspan: 18 ft 0 in (5.49 m)
- Aspect ratio: ≈1 (ultra-low)
- Empty weight: 1,650 lb (748 kg)
- Gross weight: 2,250 lb (1,021 kg)
- Fuel capacity: 50 US gal (190 L)
- Powerplant: 1 × Lycoming IO-360-A1B6D 4-cylinder air-cooled horizontally opposed piston engine, fuel injected, 200 hp (150 kW)
- Propellers: 2-blade fixed-pitch (later 3-blade constant-speed) pusher

Performance

- Maximum speed: 130 mph (210 km/h, 110 kn)
- Cruise speed: 105 mph (169 km/h, 91 kn)
- Stall speed: 45 mph (72 km/h, 39 kn)
- Range: 525 mi (845 km, 456 nmi)
- Rate of climb: 400 ft/min (2.0 m/s)Takeoff roll: 1,200 ft (366 m) (std day, SL)
  Landing roll: 1,000 ft (305 m) (std day, SL)
  Observed climb in testing: ≈250 ft/min at 75 mph
