= Skipper Scrappy UAC-200 =

Scrappy UAC-200

General information
- Type: Homebuilt aerobatic biplane
- National origin: United States
- Designer: WA Skipper
- Status: Production completed
- Number built: 3

The Skipper Scrappy UAC-200 is an American homebuilt aerobatic biplane that was designed by WA Skipper of Greeley, Colorado, introduced in 1970. The aircraft was supplied in the form of plans for amateur construction, but plans seem to no longer be available.

== Design and development ==
The aircraft features a biplane layout, a single-seat, fixed conventional landing gear and a single engine in tractor configuration.

The aircraft fuselage is made from welded steel tubing with the 20.75 ft (6.3 m) span wings built from wood and the whole aircraft covered in doped aircraft fabric. The standard engine used is the 200 hp (149 kW) Lycoming IO-360 powerplant, which gives a 3700 foot per minute (19 m/s) climb rate and a top speed of 188 mph (303 km/h).

The aircraft has an empty weight of 981 lb (445 kg) and a gross weight of 1,428 lb (648 kg), giving a useful load of 447 lb (203 kg). With full fuel of 28 U.S. gallons (110 L; 23 imp gal) the payload is 279 lb (127 kg).

== Operational history ==
By October 2013 three examples had once been registered in the United States with the Federal Aviation Administration, but only one remained currently registered.

In September 1997 a Scrappy UAC-200 was flown to third place in the International Aerobatic Club basic category at the East Coast Aerobatics Championships, held in Warrenton, Virginia.

== Specifications (Scrappy UAC-200) ==
Data from Plane and Pilot

General characteristics

- Crew: one
- Length: 16 ft 8 in (5.08 m)
- Wingspan: 20 ft 8 in (6.30 m)
- Empty weight: 981 lb (445 kg)
- Gross weight: 1,428 lb (648 kg)
- Fuel capacity: 28 U.S. gallons (110 L; 23 imp gal)
- Powerplant: 1 × Lycoming IO-360 four cylinder, air-cooled, four stroke aircraft engine, 200 hp (150 kW)
- Propellers: 2-bladed constant speed propeller

Performance

- Maximum speed: 188 mph (303 km/h, 163 kn)
- Cruise speed: 151 mph (243 km/h, 131 kn)
- Stall speed: 55 mph (89 km/h, 48 kn)
- Range: 500 mi (800 km, 430 nmi)
- Rate of climb: 3,700 ft/min (19 m/s)
