= CEI Free Spirit Mk II =

Free Spirit Mk II

General information
- Type: Homebuilt aircraft
- National origin: United States
- Manufacturer: CEI
- Designer: Richard Cabrinha
- Status: Prototypes only completed
- Number built: Two

History
- Introduction date: 1995

The CEI Free Spirit Mk II, also called the Cabrinha Free Spirit Mark II and the Cabrinha Model 423, is a three-seat American homebuilt aircraft that was designed by Richard Cabrinha and produced by CEI of Auburn, California, introduced at AirVenture in 1995. The aircraft was intended to be supplied as a kit for amateur construction, but only prototypes seem to have been completed.

== Design and development ==
The design goals of the Free Spirit Mk II included long range, high speed and a high rate of climb. The aircraft features a cantilever low-wing, a two-seats-in-side-by-side configuration, plus a jump seat in an enclosed cockpit, retractable tricycle landing gear and a single engine in tractor configuration.

The aircraft is made from lightweight pre-molded composites. Its 30.30 ft (9.2 m) span wing employs a NASA NLF(1)-0215F natural laminar flow airfoil, mounts flaps and has a very small wing area of 86.00 sq ft (7.990 m^{2}), giving a high wing loading of 25.0 lb/sq ft (122 kg/m2). The cabin width is 44.5 in (113 cm). The acceptable power range is 150 to 220 hp (112 to 164 kW) and the standard engine used is the 210 hp (157 kW) Lycoming IO-360 powerplant.

The Free Spirit Mk II has a typical empty weight of 1,250 lb (570 kg) and a gross weight of 2,150 lb (980 kg), giving a useful load of 900 lb (410 kg). With full fuel of 52 U.S. gallons (200 L; 43 imp gal) the payload for crew, passengers and baggage is 588 lb (267 kg).

== Operational history ==
In 1998 the company reported that two aircraft were flying, but by December 2013 only one example remained registered in the United States with the Federal Aviation Administration.

== Specifications (Free Spirit Mk II) ==
Data from AeroCrafter and The Incomplete Guide to Airfoil Usage

General characteristics

- Crew: one
- Capacity: two passengers
- Length: 20 ft 6 in (6.25 m)
- Wingspan: 30 ft 4 in (9.25 m)
- Wing area: 86.00 sq ft (7.990 m^{2})
- Airfoil: NASA NLF(1)-0215F natural laminar flow
- Fuel capacity: 52.00 U.S. gallons (196.8 L; 43.30 imp gal)
- Powerplant: 1 × Lycoming IO-360 four cylinder, air-cooled, fuel injected, four stroke aircraft engine, 210 hp (160 kW)
- Propellers: 3-bladed constant speed propeller

Performance

- Maximum speed: 300 mph (480 km/h, 260 kn)
- Cruise speed: 240 mph (390 km/h, 210 kn)
- Stall speed: 52 mph (84 km/h, 45 kn) flaps and landing gear down
- Range: 1,200 mi (1,900 km, 1,000 nmi)
- Service ceiling: 24,000 ft (7,300 m)
- Rate of climb: 1,600 ft/min (8.1 m/s)
- Wing loading: 25.0 lb/sq ft (122 kg/m^{2})
