= Lycoming O-360 =

Flat-four piston aircraft engine family by Lycoming

O-360
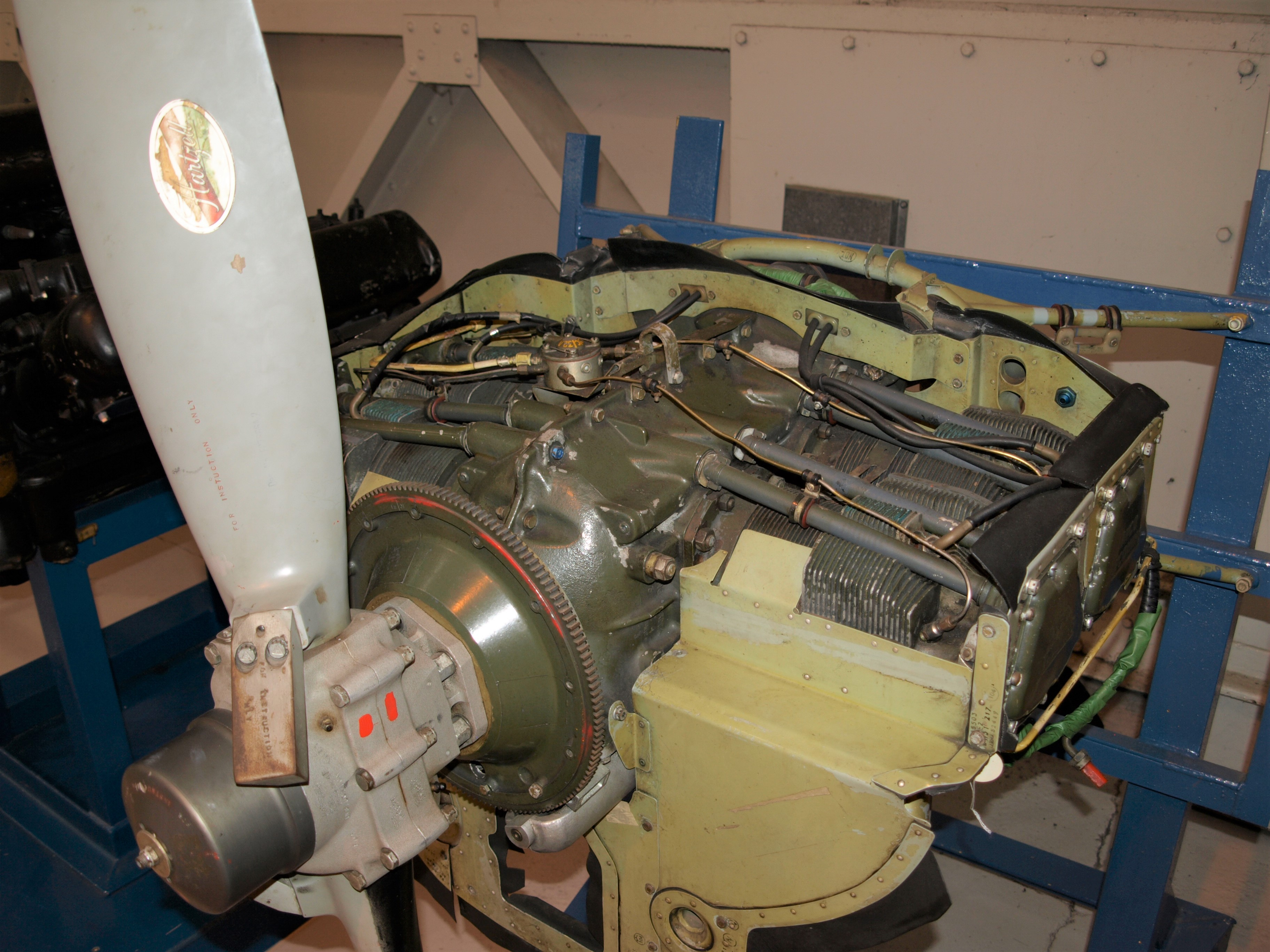
- Lycoming IO-360-A1B6
- Type: Piston aircraft engine
- National origin: United States
- Manufacturer: Lycoming Engines
- First run: 1952; 1963 (injected version)
- Major applications: Cessna 172 R & S; Cessna 177 Cardinal; Mooney M20
- Manufactured: 1955–present
- Developed into: Lycoming IO-390; Lycoming O-540; Lycoming IO-720

The Lycoming O-360 is a family of four-cylinder, direct-drive, horizontally opposed, air-cooled, piston aircraft engines. Engines in the O-360 series produce between 145 and 225 hp (110 and 170 kW), with the basic O-360 producing 180 hp (130 kW).

The engine family has been installed in thousands of aircraft, including the Cessna 172, Piper Cherokee/Archer, Grumman Tiger, and many home-built types. It has a factory rated time between overhaul (TBO) of 2000 hours or twelve years. O-360 family engines are also widely used in airboats, most notably in the Hurricane Aircats used by the US Army during the Vietnam War.

The first O-360 certified was the A1A model, certified on 20 July 1955 to United States CAR 13 effective March 5, 1952 as amended by 13-1 and 13-2. The Lycoming IO-390 is an O-360 which has had its cylinder bore increased by 3/16 inch (4.8 mm), developing 210 hp (160 kW).

== Series ==
The O-360 family of engines comprises 167 different models with 12 different prefixes. All have a 361 cu in (6 L) displacement and 5.125 and 4.375 in (130 and 111 mm) bore and stroke.

- O-360 carbureted series
- HO-360 horizontally mounted series for helicopter installation
- LO-360 same as O-360, but with left-hand rotating crankshaft, for use in pairs on twin-engined aircraft
- TO-360 turbocharged series
- LTO-360 turbocharged left-hand rotation series
- IO-360 fuel-injected series
- LIO-360 same as IO-360, but with left-hand rotating crankshaft
- AIO-360 inverted mount (dry sump aerobatic) fuel-injected series
- AEIO-360 aerobatic fuel-injected series
- HIO-360 horizontally mounted fuel-injected series for helicopters
- LHIO-360 left-hand rotation, fuel-injected, horizontally mounted for helicopters
- TIO-360 turbocharged and fuel-injected series

== Applications ==
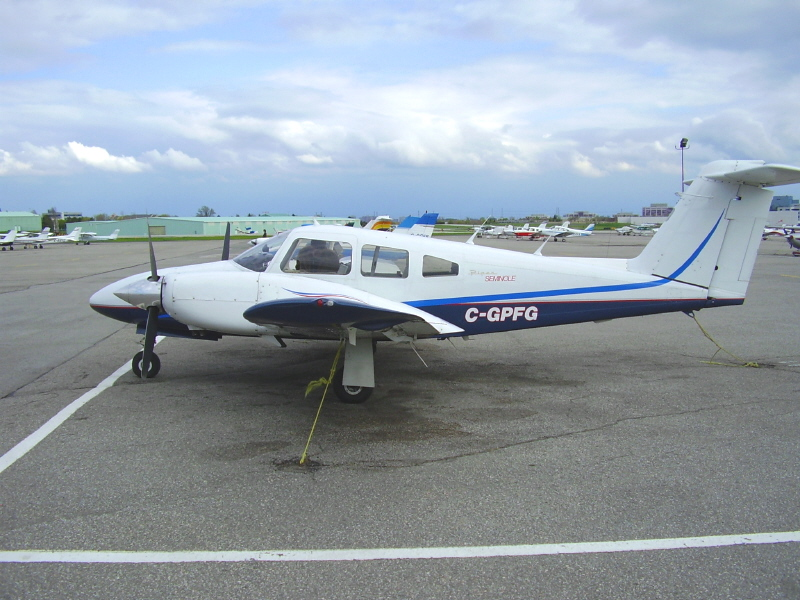
Piper PA-44-180 Seminole features two Lycoming O-360 engines

O-360

- Aer Lualdi L.55
- Aero Boero AB-180
- Aero Commander Lark Commander
- Aero Concepts Discovery
- American Aviation AA-2 Patriot
- Australian Lightwing SP-4000 Speed
- Aviamilano Nibbio
- Aviat Husky A-1C-180
- Backcountry Super Cubs Mackey SQ2
- Backcountry Super Cubs Supercruiser
- Backcountry Super Cubs Super Cub
- Barrows Bearhawk
- Barrows Bearhawk Patrol
- Beagle Airedale
- Beechcraft Duchess
- Beechcraft Musketeer
- Beechcraft Travel Air
- Bölkow Bo 207
- Brutsche Freedom 180 STOL
- Bushcaddy L-162 Max
- Bushcaddy L-164
- Canadian Home Rotors Safari
- Cessna 172
- Cessna 177
- Collins Dipper
- Cozy MK IV
- CubCrafters Carbon Cub EX
- CubCrafters CC18-180 Top Cub
- Dakota Cub Super 18
- Dean Delt-Air 250
- Diamond DA40
- Dyn'Aéro MCR R180
- Falconar F12A Cruiser
- Glasair GlaStar
- Grinvalds Orion
- Grob G 115
- Grumman American AA-5
- Guimbal Cabri G2
- Hurricane Aircat (airboat)
- IRI T23B
- Javelin Wichawk
- Lambert Mission 212
- Lancair 360
- Lucas L-6B
- Lucas L8
- Malmö MFI-10B Vipan
- Maule M-5
- Mooney M20
- Morane-Saulnier MS-893E
- Moynet 360-4 Jupiter
- MSW One
- Murphy Elite
- Mustang Aeronautics Mustang II
- Norman Dube Aerocruiser Plus
- PAC MFI-17 Mushshak
- Peña Bilouis
- Peña Dahu
- Peña Joker
- Piper PA-18 Super Cub
- Piper Cherokee 180
- Piper PA-24-180 Comanche
- Piper PA-44-180 Seminole
- Rihn DR-107 One Design
- Robin Aiglon
- Robin DR.300-180
- Robin DR.400-180
- Robinson R22
- Saab 91 Safir
- Sands Fokker Dr.1 Triplane
- Seabird Seeker
- Schweizer SGM 2-37
- Slepcev Storch
- Stoddard-Hamilton Glasair II
- Turbay T-3
- Ultimate 10-180
- Van's Aircraft RV-6
- Van's Aircraft RV-7
- Van's Aircraft RV-8
- VTOL Aircraft Phillicopter
- Wassmer WA-40
- Wassmer WA-54 Atlantic
- Whisper X350 Generation II
- Zenair CH 640
- Zenith STOL CH 801

LO-360

- Beechcraft Duchess
- Piper PA-44-180 Seminole

IO-360

- Adventure Air Adventurer
- AeroCad AeroCanard
- Aircraft Technologies Acro 1
- Australian Lightwing SP-6000
- Aviat Husky A-1C-200
- Beechcraft Musketeer Super III
- Berkut 360
- Brutsche Freedom 210 STOL
- CEI Free Spirit Mk II
- Cessna 172R/172S
- Cessna 177RG
- Commander 112
- Commander 114
- Diamond DA40
- Diamond DA42
- Dream Tundra
- Evektor VUT100-120i Cobra
- Falconar SAL Mustang
- Fuji FA-200 Aero Subaru
- Giles G-200
- Glassic SQ2000
- Lake LA-4-200 Buccaneer
- LFU 205
- Mooney M20
- Mustang Aeronautics Mustang II
- Osprey GP4
- PAC MFI-17 Mushshak
- PAC CT/4
- Partenavia P.68
- Peña Bilouis
- Peña Dahu
- Piper Arrow
- Piper PA-34 Seneca I
- Prescott Pusher
- Sawyer Skyjacker II
- Scaled Composites Boomerang
- Skipper Scrappy UAC-200
- Scottish Aviation Bulldog
- Seawind 2000
- SGP M-222 Flamingo
- Socata Tobago TB200XL
- Sorrell Hiperbipe
- Stolp Super Starduster
- Tecnam P2010
- Texas Aircraft Stallion
- Thorp T-18
- Toyota TAA-1
- Ultimate 10-200
- Van's Aircraft RV-6
- Van's Aircraft RV-7
- Van's Aircraft RV-8
- Wega 180
- Zeppelin NT
- Zlín Z 242

LIO-360

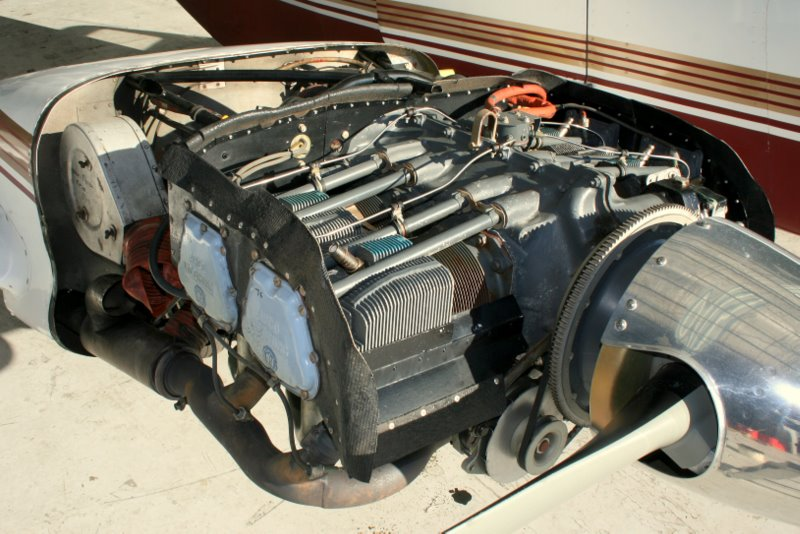
An LIO-360 on the starboard wing of a Piper PA-34-200 Seneca I.

- Piper PA-34 Seneca I
- Diamond DA42

AIO-360

- Stephens Akro

AEIO-360

- Aero-Cam Slick 360
- Aviat Eagle II
- American Champion Super Decathlon
- Extra EA-200
- FFA AS-202 Bravo
- Great Lakes Sport Trainer
- Grob G 115E
- Mudry CAP 10
- Peña Capeña
- Pitts Special
- Tech Aero TR 200
- Valmet L-70 Vinka
- Zlín Z 242

HIO-360

- Enstrom F-28
- OH-23 Raven
- Schweizer 300

LHIO-360

- Silvercraft SH-3
- Silvercraft SH-4

== Specifications (O-360-A1A) ==
Data from Type Certificate Data Sheet E-286

=== General characteristics ===
- Type: Four-cylinder, dual magneto, horizontally opposed, four-stroke aircraft engine
- Bore: 5.125 in (130 mm)
- Stroke: 4.375 in (111 mm)
- Displacement: 361 cu in (5.9 L)
- Dry weight: 258 lb (117 kg)

=== Components ===
- Fuel type: 91/96 avgas minimum grade
- Oil system: 8 US qt (8 L) wet sump
- Cooling system: air-cooled

=== Performance ===
- Power output: 180 hp (130 kW) at 2700 rpm
- Compression ratio: 8.5:1
- Fuel consumption: 7.8 US gal (30 L) to 9 US gal (34 L) per hour

== See also ==
- Superior Air Parts Vantage

Related lists

- List of aircraft engines
