= VTOL Aircraft Phillicopter =

Phillicopter
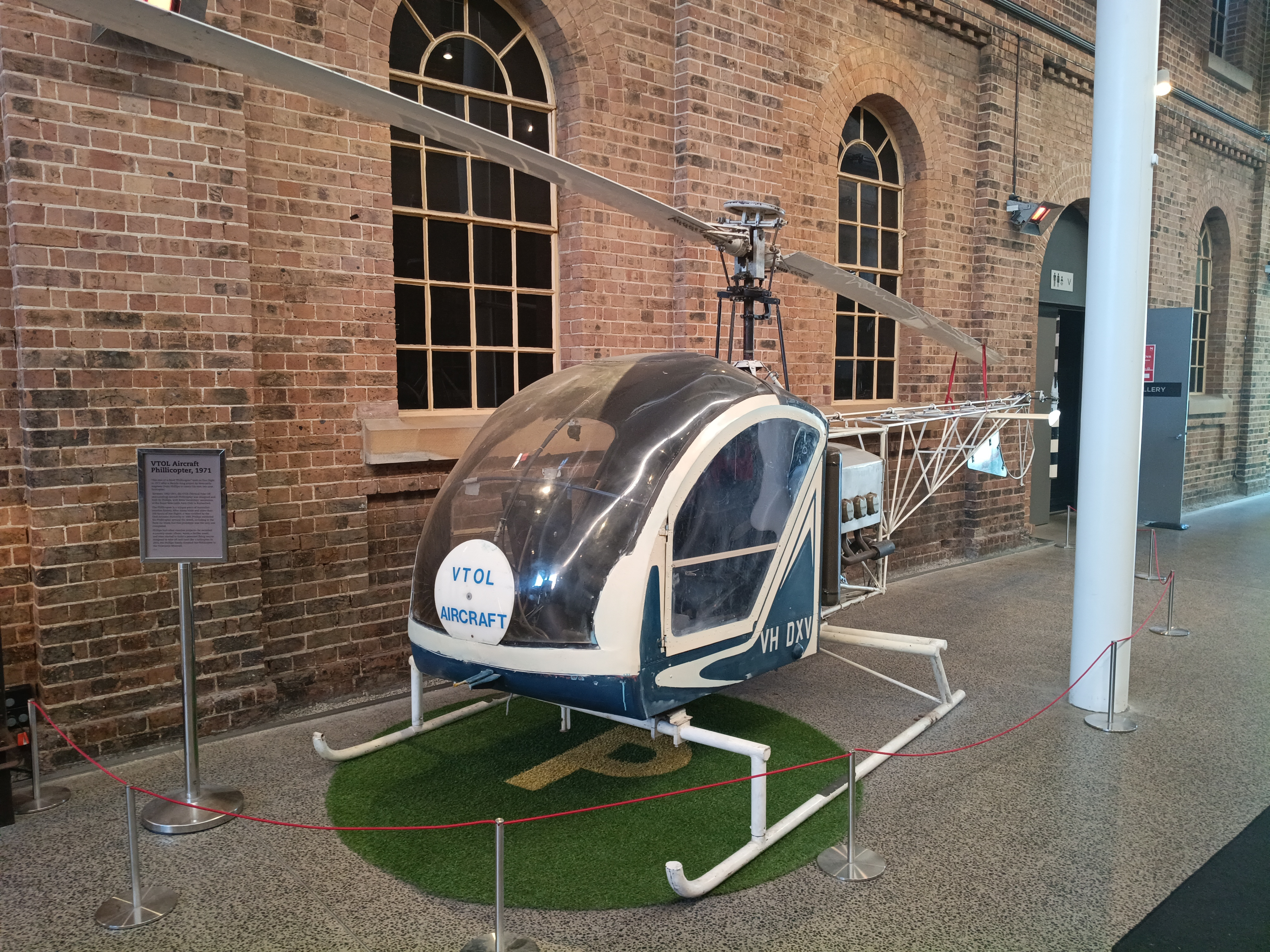
- The original VTOL Phillicopter prototype on display at Newcastle Museum.

General information
- Type: Light utility helicopter
- National origin: Australia
- Manufacturer: VTOL Aircraft

History
- First flight: 1971

The VTOL Aircraft Phillicopter is a 1970s Australian light utility helicopter designed, built and flown by Newcastle engineer Duan A. Phillips. The two-seat prototype first flew in 1971 and was developed by VTOL Aircraft Pty Ltd. The Phillicopter was granted an Australian type certificate in 1984 and the original prototype is preserved at Newcastle Museum as a unique example of Australian aviation history.

== Design ==
Duan A. Phillips, a Newcastle-based engineer, began designing a two-seat helicopter in 1962, initially working from his garage, and started to build a prototype in 1967. The prototype, the Phillicopter Mark I, was completed and first flew in 1971, powered by a single 145 hp (108 kW) Rolls-Royce Continental O-200 engine. Phillips set up VTOL Aircraft Pty Ltd in 1971 to construct and develop the Phillicopter. The Phillicopter was granted its Australian type certificate in 1984, and the prototype was modified to represent a pre-production standard.

The Phillicopter is a conventional two-seat helicopter with a two-blade rotor powered by a 180 hp (134 kW) Lycoming O-360 piston engine. It has an enclosed cabin with removable doors and is fitted with dual controls. The open frame fuselage has a two-blade tail rotor at the rear. A 91-litre fuel tank is fitted and an optional 91-litre central tank can be fitted, although this can also be used for crop spraying chemicals rather than fuel. The Phillicopter has a fixed skid type landing gear.

== Specifications ==
Data from Brassey's World Aircraft & Systems Directory

General characteristics

- Crew: 2
- Length: 7.07 m (23 ft 2 in)
- Height: 2.59 m (8 ft 6 in)
- Empty weight: 454 kg (1,000 lb)
- Max takeoff weight: 703 kg (1,550 lb)
- Powerplant: 1 × Lycoming O-360 piston engine, 130 kW (180 hp)
- Main rotor diameter: 7.77 m (25 ft 6 in)
- Main rotor area: 47.38 m^{2} (510.0 sq ft)

Performance

- Cruise speed: 139 km/h (86 mph, 75 kn)
- Never exceed speed: 203 km/h (126 mph, 110 kn)
- Range: 694 km (431 mi, 375 nmi) with full payload and optional centre tank.
- Service ceiling: 4,900 m (16,000 ft)

== See also ==
Related lists

- List of rotorcraft
