= Backcountry Super Cubs Supercruiser =

American light airplane

Supercruiser

General information
- Type: Amateur-built aircraft
- National origin: United States
- Manufacturer: Backcountry Super Cubs
- Status: In production (2012)
- Number built: 140

History
- Developed from: Piper PA-12 Super Cruiser

The Backcountry Super Cubs Supercruiser is an American amateur-built aircraft, designed and produced by Backcountry Super Cubs of Douglas, Wyoming. The aircraft is based upon the design of the Piper PA-12 Super Cruiser and is supplied as a kit for amateur construction.

== Design and development ==
The Supercruiser features a strut-braced high wing, a three-seat 36 in (91 cm) wide enclosed cockpit, fixed conventional landing gear and a single engine in tractor configuration. The aircraft seats the pilot in front and two passengers in the rear on a bench seat.

The aircraft fuselage is made from welded steel tubing, with the wings constructed of aluminum sheet, all covered in doped aircraft fabric. Its 38.1 ft (11.6 m) span wing has an area of 170 sq ft (16 m^{2}), is supported by "V" struts with jury struts and mounts flaps. The aircraft's recommended engine power range is 180 to 240 hp (134 to 179 kW) and standard engines used include the 180 hp (134 kW) Lycoming O-360 four-stroke powerplant. Construction time from the supplied kit is 1200 hours.

== Operational history ==
By December 2011, 140 examples had been reported as completed and flown.

== Specifications (Supercruiser) ==
Data from Kitplanes

General characteristics

- Crew: one
- Capacity: two passengers
- Length: 21 ft (6.4 m)
- Wingspan: 38.1 ft (11.6 m)
- Wing area: 170 sq ft (16 m^{2})
- Empty weight: 1,200 lb (544 kg)
- Gross weight: 2,400 lb (1,089 kg)
- Fuel capacity: 48 U.S. gallons (180 L; 40 imp gal)
- Powerplant: 1 × Lycoming O-360 four cylinder, air-cooled, four stroke aircraft engine, 180 hp (130 kW)
- Propellers: 2-bladed constant speed propeller

Performance

- Cruise speed: 115 mph (185 km/h, 100 kn)
- Stall speed: 28 mph (45 km/h, 24 kn)
- Range: 580 mi (930 km, 500 nmi)
- Rate of climb: 1,000 ft/min (5.1 m/s)
- Wing loading: 14.1 lb/sq ft (69 kg/m^{2})
