= Peña Bilouis =

French homebuilt aircraft

Bilouis

General information
- Type: Aerobatic amateur-built aircraft
- National origin: France
- Designer: Louis Peña
- Status: Plans available (2012)

History
- First flight: 2 June 1991
- Developed from: Peña Capeña

The Peña Bilouis is a French aerobatic amateur-built aircraft that was designed by the competitive aerobatic pilot Louis Peña of Dax, Landes and made available in the form of plans for amateur construction.

== Design and development ==
The Bilouis is a development of the single-seat Peña Capeña and like the Capeña is aerobatic. It features a cantilever low-wing, a two-seats-in-tandem enclosed cockpit under a bubble canopy, fixed conventional landing gear and a single engine in tractor configuration.

The Bilouis is made from wood. Its 8 m (26.2 ft) span wing has an area of 10 m^{2} (110 sq ft) and mounts flaps. The standard recommended engines are the 180 hp (134 kW) Lycoming O-360 and the fuel-injected 200 hp (149 kW) Lycoming IO-360 four-stroke powerplants.

== Specifications (Bilouis) ==
Data from Bayerl and Tacke

General characteristics

- Crew: one
- Capacity: one passenger
- Wingspan: 8 m (26 ft 3 in)
- Wing area: 10 m^{2} (110 sq ft)
- Empty weight: 600 kg (1,323 lb)
- Gross weight: 750 kg (1,653 lb) for aerobatics, 840 kg (1852 lbs) for touring
- Fuel capacity: 130 litres (29 imp gal; 34 US gal)
- Powerplant: 1 × Lycoming O-360 four cylinder, air-cooled, four stroke aircraft engine, 130 kW (180 hp)
- Propellers: 2-bladed metal constant speed propeller

Performance

- Maximum speed: 370 km/h (230 mph, 200 kn)
- Cruise speed: 260 km/h (160 mph, 140 kn)
- Stall speed: 90 km/h (56 mph, 49 kn)
- Rate of climb: 12 m/s (2,400 ft/min)
- Wing loading: 84.0 kg/m^{2} (17.2 lb/sq ft) at gross weight for touring
