= Backcountry Super Cubs Super Cub =

American homebuilt aircraft

Super Cub
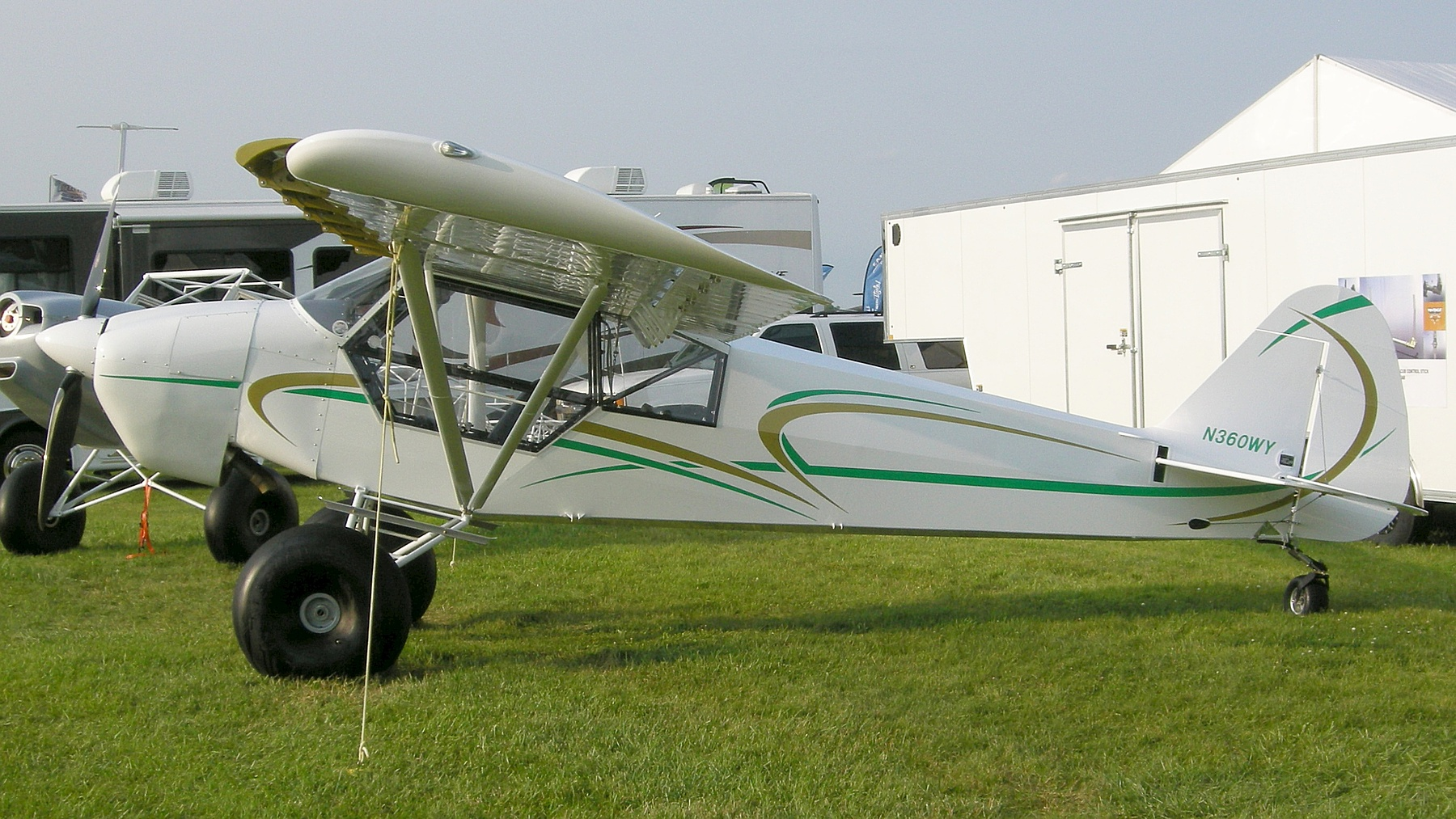

General information
- Type: Amateur-built aircraft
- National origin: United States
- Manufacturer: Backcountry Super Cubs
- Status: In production (2012)
- Number built: 138

History
- Developed from: Piper PA-18 Super Cub

The Backcountry Super Cubs Super Cub, also referred to as the Supercub replica, is an American amateur-built aircraft, designed and produced by Backcountry Super Cubs of Douglas, Wyoming. The aircraft is based on the design of the Piper PA-18 Super Cub and is supplied as a kit for amateur construction.

== Design and development ==
The Super Cub features a strut-braced high-wing, a two-seats-in-tandem enclosed cockpit that is 30 in (76 cm) wide, fixed conventional landing gear and a single engine in tractor configuration.

The aircraft fuselage is made from welded steel tubing, with the wings constructed of aluminum sheet, all covered in doped aircraft fabric. Its 37.7 ft (11.5 m) span wing has an area of 170 sq ft (16 m^{2}), is supported by "V" struts with jury struts and mounts flaps. The aircraft's recommended engine power range is 180 to 240 hp (134 to 179 kW) and standard engines used include the 180 hp (134 kW) Lycoming O-360 four-stroke powerplant. The aircraft can be fitted with tundra tires for operation on soft or rough surfaces. Construction time from the supplied kit is 1200 hours.

== Operational history ==
By December 2011, 138 examples had been reported as completed and flown.

== Specifications (Super Cub) ==
Data from Kitplanes

General characteristics

- Crew: one
- Capacity: one passenger
- Length: 21 ft (6.4 m)
- Wingspan: 37.7 ft (11.5 m)
- Wing area: 170 sq ft (16 m^{2})
- Empty weight: 1,200 lb (544 kg)
- Gross weight: 2,400 lb (1,089 kg)
- Fuel capacity: 48 U.S. gallons (180 L; 40 imp gal)
- Powerplant: 1 × Lycoming O-360 four cylinder, air-cooled, four stroke aircraft engine, 180 hp (130 kW)
- Propellers: 2-bladed constant speed propeller

Performance

- Cruise speed: 112 mph (180 km/h, 97 kn)
- Stall speed: 28 mph (45 km/h, 24 kn)
- Range: 580 mi (930 km, 500 nmi)
- Rate of climb: 1,000 ft/min (5.1 m/s)
- Wing loading: 14.1 lb/sq ft (69 kg/m^{2})
