= Howard Hughes Engineering =

Australian aircraft manufacturer

Howard Hughes Engineering Pty Ltd
- Company type: Privately held company
- Industry: Aerospace, automotive manufacturing, boat building and general engineering
- Founded: mid-1970s
- Headquarters: Ballina, New South Wales, Australia
- Products: Kit aircraft
- Website: lightwing.com.au

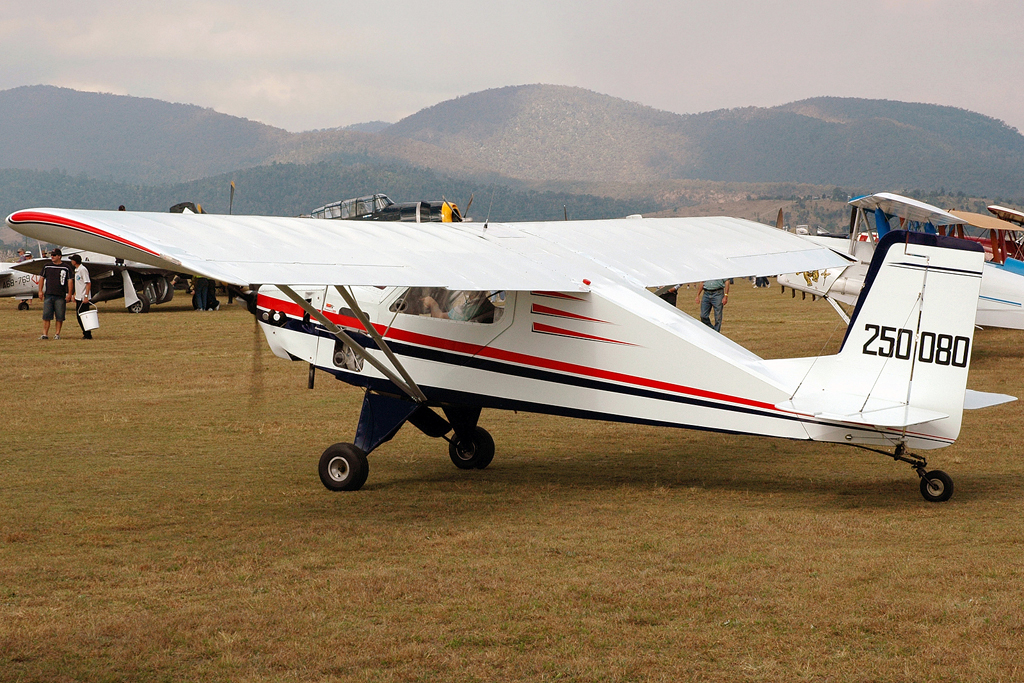
Australian LightWing GR532

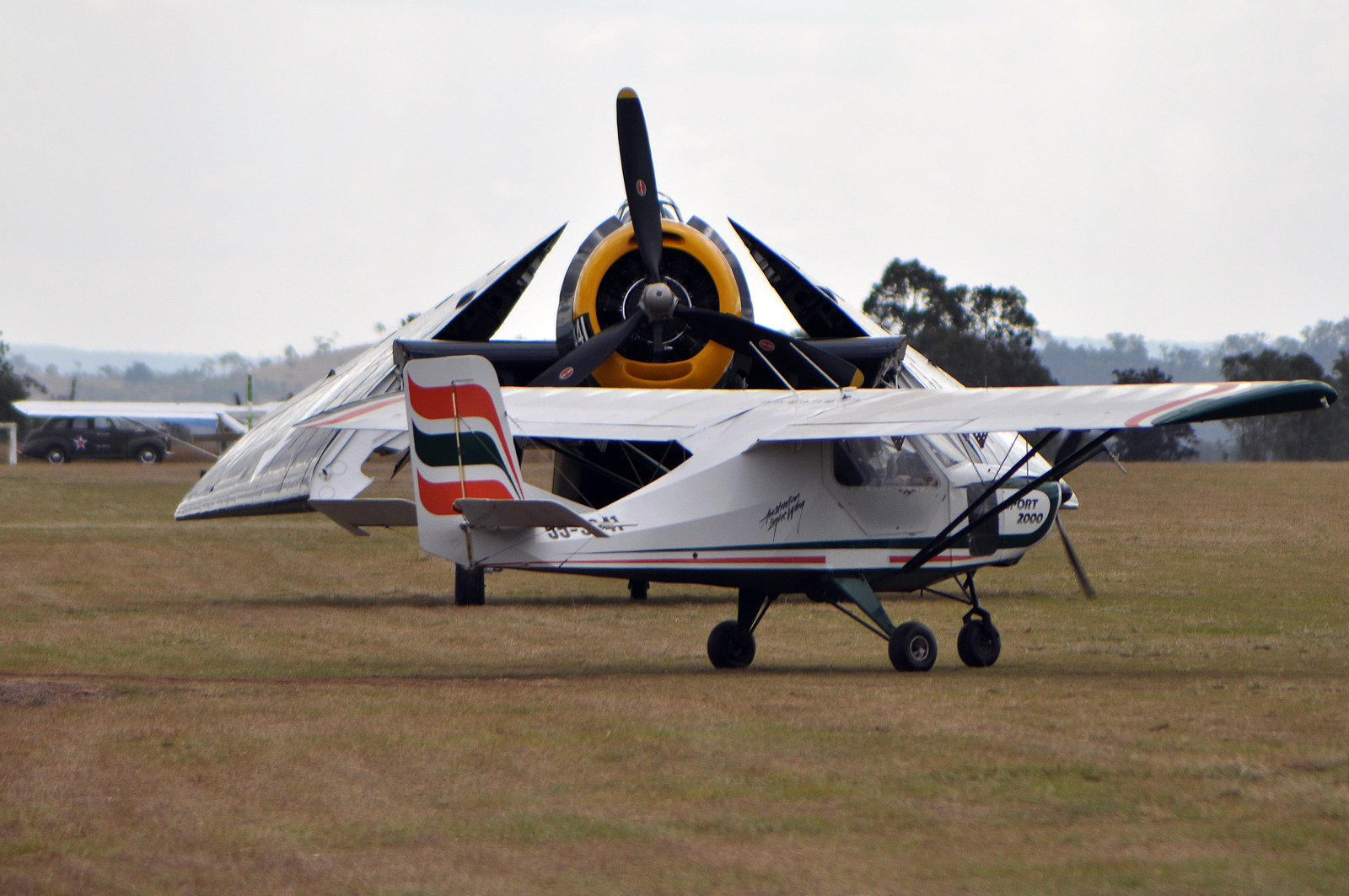
Australian LightWing GR912 Sport 2000

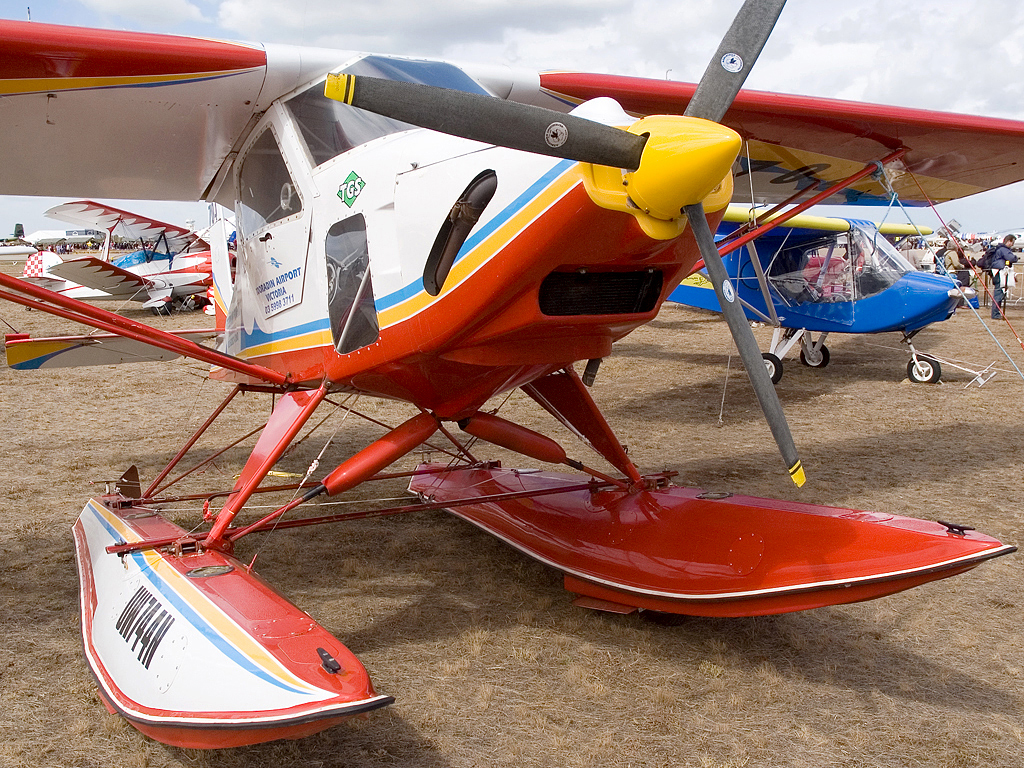
Australian LightWing GR582

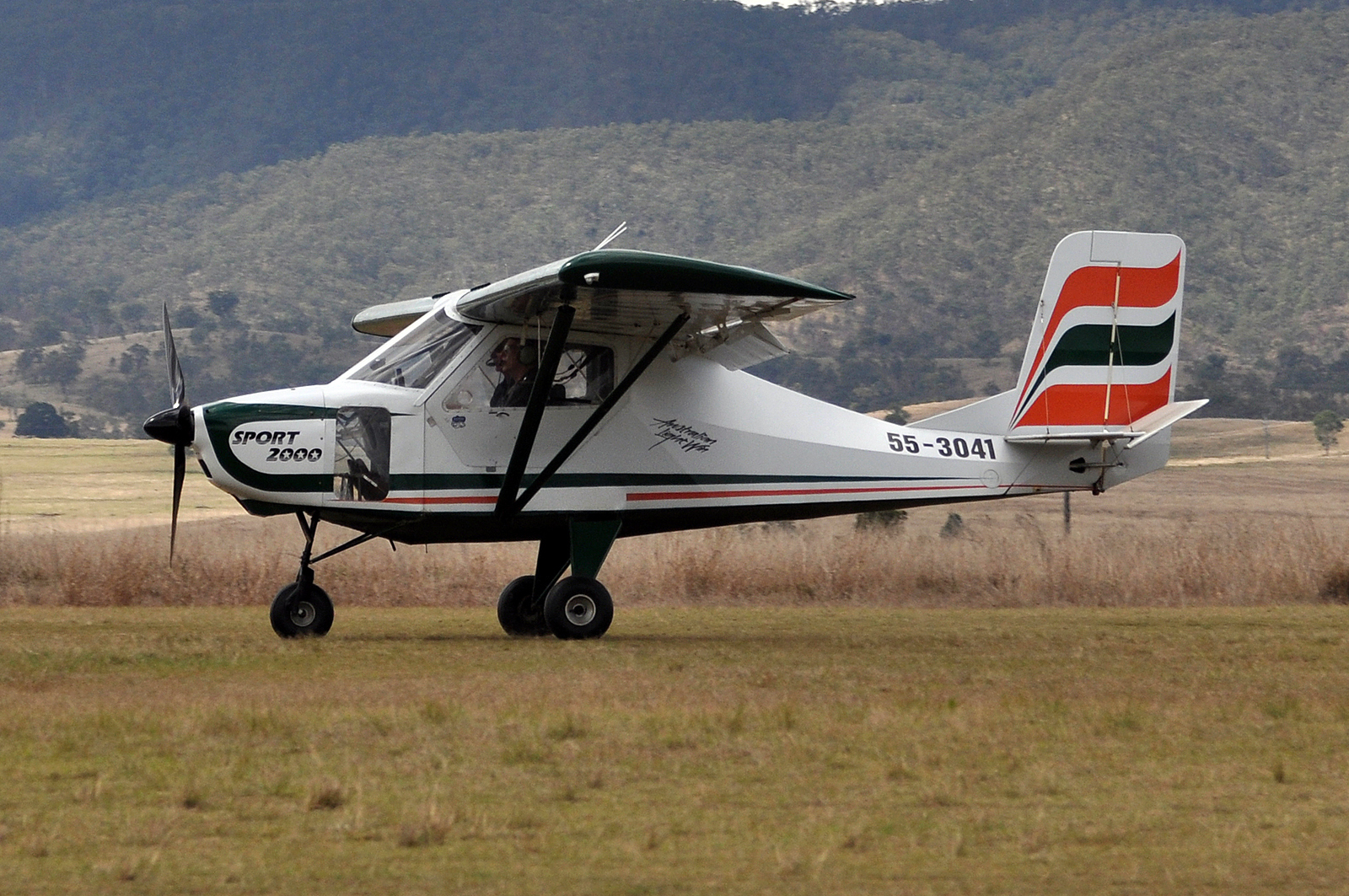
Australian LightWing GR912 Sport 2000

Howard Hughes Engineering Pty Ltd is an Australian aircraft manufacturer, boat and automobile builder and general engineering company based in Ballina, New South Wales.

The company specializes in the design and manufacture of light aircraft in the form of kits for amateur construction and ready-to-fly aircraft for the European Fédération Aéronautique Internationale microlight and the American light-sport aircraft categories.

Australian Lightwing is an aircraft brand of Howard Hughes Engineering.

== History ==
The company was formed in the mid-1970s as a boat building and general engineering concern, based in West Ballina. In 1985 the company expanded into aircraft design, as a result of the new ultralight aircraft rules enacted in Australia. The first aircraft design, the Australian LightWing GR532, was first accepted by the Civil Aviation Safety Authority on 29 September 1986. Working in welded 4130 steel tubing, the company offered an alternative to the aluminium and Dacron sailcloth ultralights then being produced.

In 1995 the company relocated to the Ballina Byron Gateway Airport industrial park.

== Products ==
The company has produced a wide range of aircraft, including the high-wing GR 532 GR 582, GR912, Pocket Rocket, ALW Sport and Tapis, the low-wing two-seat SP-2000 Speed, four seat SP-4000 Speed and the low or high-wing SP-6000. There is also a biplane design the PR BiPe and the PR Breeze parasol wing.

The SP-2000 has been accepted by the US Federal Aviation Administration as a light-sport aircraft. The company has also entered electric car design with the three-seat Hughes Engineering Road-e.

Other products include a flight simulator, the Hughes Engineering Cunning Cat 30 ft (9 m) sailboat and a CAD/CAM Cutting Table. The company has also developed computer software, including a telephone messaging system and a business costing and payroll program.

== Aircraft ==
Summary of aircraft built by Howard Hughes Engineering
Model name	First flight	Number built	Type
Australian Lightwing GR 532			Two-seat high-wing ultralight aircraft
Australian Lightwing GR 582			Two-seat high-wing light-sport aircraft
Australian Lightwing GR 912			Two-seat high-wing light-sport aircraft
Australian Lightwing SP-2000 Speed			Two-seat low-wing, light-sport aircraft
Australian Lightwing SP-4000 Speed			Four-seat low-wing kit aircraft
Australian Lightwing SP-6000			Six-seat high or low-wing kit aircraft
Australian Lightwing Pocket Rocket			enclosed cabin single-seat high-wing aircraft
Australian Lightwing PR BiPe			open cockpit biplane
Australian Lightwing PR Breeze			single-seat parasol-wing kit aircraft
Australian Lightwing Tapis			Two-seat high-wing kit aircraft
Australian Lightwing ALW Sport			Two-seat high-wing kit aircraft
