= Australian Lightwing GR 912 =

GR 912 & Sport 2000
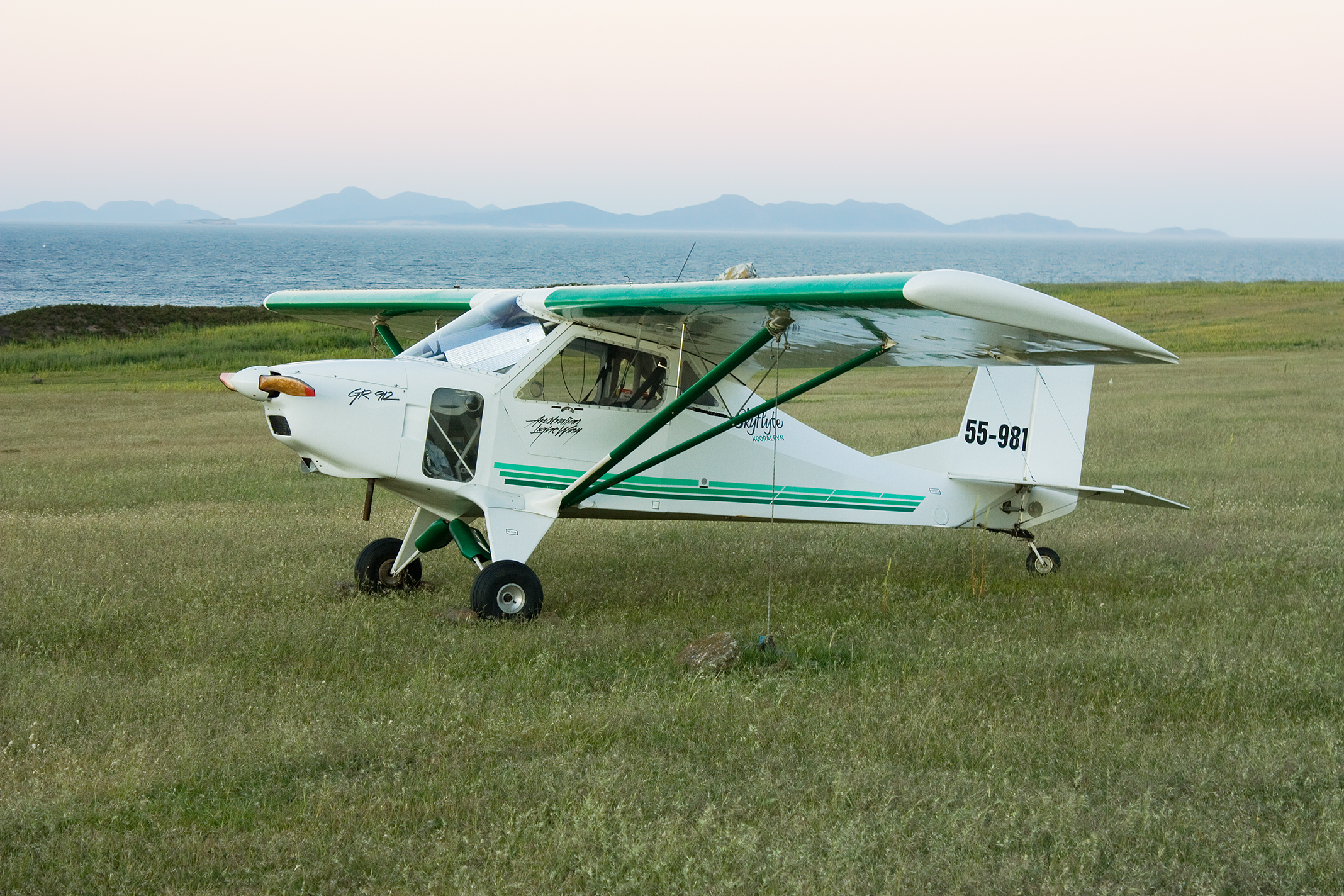
- GR 912 model

General information
- Type: Light-sport aircraft
- National origin: Australia
- Manufacturer: Australian Lightwing
- Status: In production

History
- Introduction date: 1986

The Australian Lightwing GR 912 and Sport 2000 are a family of Australian light-sport aircraft, designed and produced by Australian Lightwing and introduced in 1986. The aircraft is supplied as a kit for amateur construction or as a complete ready-to-fly-aircraft.

== Design and development ==
The aircraft series feature a strut-braced high-wing, a two-seats-in-side-by-side configuration enclosed cockpit, fixed tricycle landing gear or conventional landing gear and a single engine in tractor configuration.

The aircraft is made with a welded steel fuselage covered in a combination of fibreglass and doped aircraft fabric. Its 9.50 m (31.2 ft) span wing is made with an aluminum frame and partially covered in aluminum sheet and doped fabric. Standard engines available are the 64 hp (48 kW) Rotax 582 two-stroke, the 80 hp (60 kW) Rotax 912UL, the 100 hp (75 kW) Rotax 912ULS four-stroke powerplant and automotive conversions. The cockpit width is 106 cm (42 in).

== Variants ==
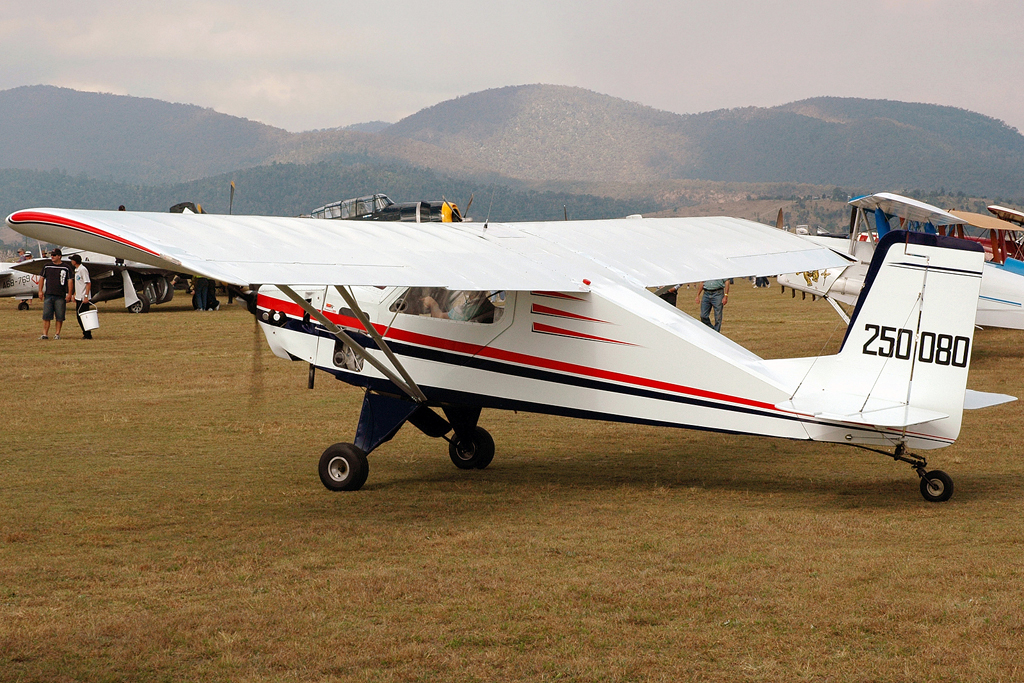
Australian LightWing GR 532

GR 532
Initial version with Rotax 532 powerplant
GR 582
Version with Rotax 582 powerplant
GR 912
Tail wheel-equipped version
Sport 2000
Nose-wheel equipped version

== Specifications (GR 912) ==
Data from Jane's All the World's Aircraft 2007–2008

General characteristics

- Crew: one
- Capacity: one passenger
- Length: 5.68 m (18 ft 8 in)
- Wingspan: 9.50 m (31 ft 2 in)
- Height: 1.90 m (6 ft 3 in)
- Wing area: 15.35 m^{2} (165.2 sq ft)
- Empty weight: 295 kg (650 lb)
- Gross weight: 544 kg (1,199 lb)
- Fuel capacity: 60 L (16 US gal; 13 imp gal)
- Powerplant: 1 × Rotax 912 ULS four cylinder, liquid and air-cooled, four stroke aircraft engine, 73.5 kW (98.6 hp)

Performance

- Maximum speed: 176 km/h (109 mph, 95 kn)
- Cruise speed: 148 km/h (92 mph, 80 kn)
- Stall speed: 74 km/h (46 mph, 40 kn)
- Range: 400 km (250 mi, 220 nmi)
- Rate of climb: 4.1 m/s (800 ft/min)
