= Backcountry Super Cubs Mackey SQ2 =

American homebuilt aircraft

Mackey SQ2
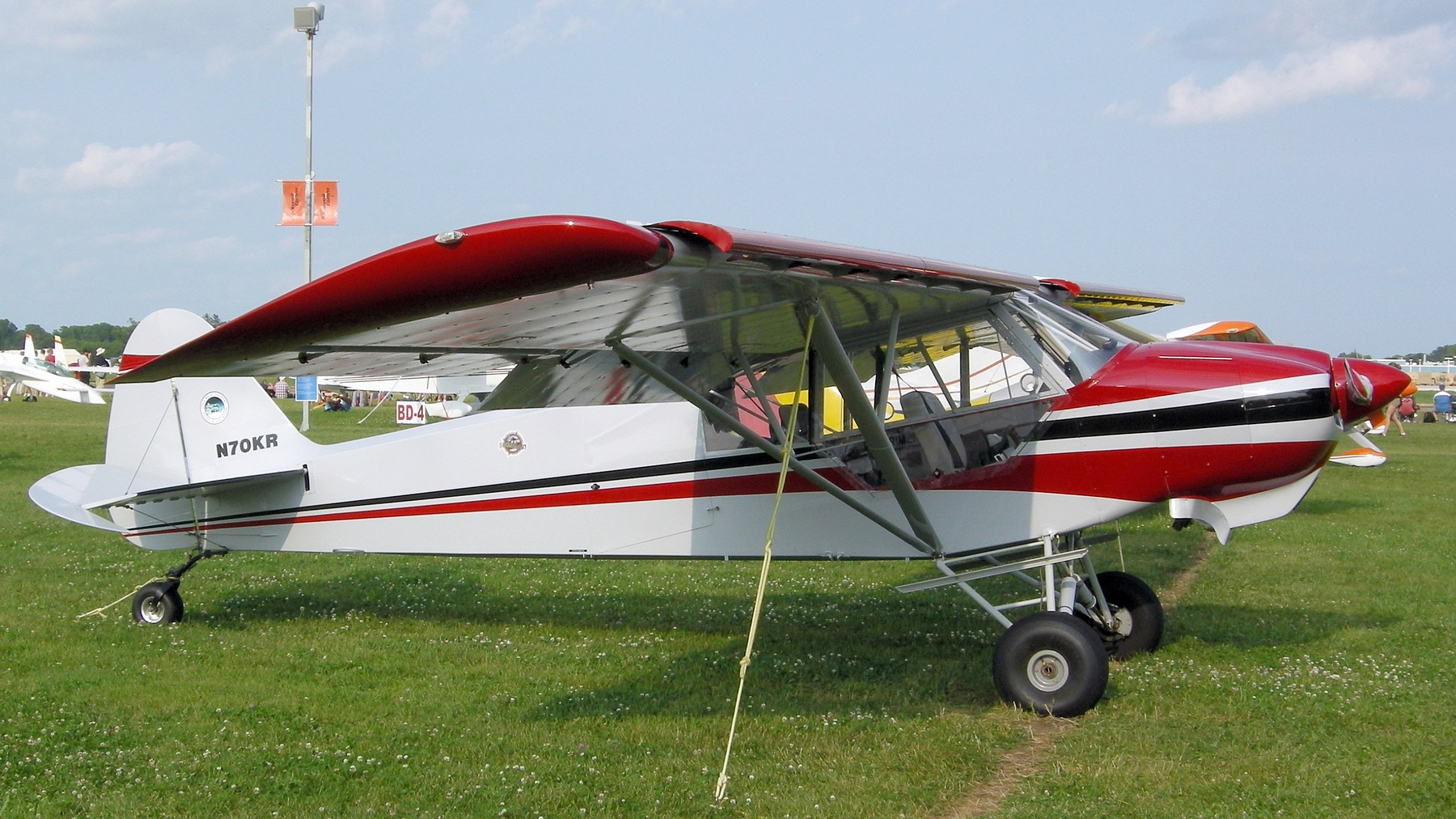

General information
- Type: Amateur-built aircraft
- National origin: United States
- Manufacturer: Backcountry Super Cubs
- Status: In production (2012)
- Number built: 7

History
- Developed from: Piper PA-18 Super Cub

The Backcountry Super Cubs Mackey SQ2 is an American STOL amateur-built aircraft, designed and produced by Backcountry Super Cubs of Douglas, Wyoming. The aircraft is based upon the design of the Piper PA-18 Super Cub and is supplied as a kit for amateur construction.

== Design and development ==
The Mackey SQ2 features a strut-braced high-wing, a two-seats-in-tandem enclosed cockpit that is 30 in (76 cm) wide, fixed conventional landing gear and a single engine in tractor configuration.

The aircraft fuselage is made from welded steel tubing, with the wings constructed of aluminum sheet, all covered in doped aircraft fabric. Its 36.9 ft (11.2 m) span wing has an area of 170 sq ft (16 m^{2}), is supported by "V" struts with jury struts and mounts flaps as well as leading edge slats. The aircraft's recommended engine power range is 180 to 240 hp (134 to 179 kW) and standard engines used include the 180 hp (134 kW) Lycoming O-360 four-stroke powerplant. The aircraft can be fitted with tundra tires for operations on soft or rough surfaces. Construction time from the supplied kit is 1200 hours.

== Operational history ==
By December 2011 seven examples had been reported as completed and flown.

== Specifications (Mackey SQ2) ==
Data from Kitplanes

General characteristics

- Crew: one
- Capacity: one passenger
- Length: 21 ft (6.4 m)
- Wingspan: 39.9 ft (12.2 m)
- Wing area: 170 sq ft (16 m^{2})
- Empty weight: 1,200 lb (544 kg)
- Gross weight: 2,200 lb (998 kg)
- Fuel capacity: 48 U.S. gallons (180 L; 40 imp gal)
- Powerplant: 1 × Lycoming O-360 four cylinder, air-cooled, four stroke aircraft engine, 180 hp (130 kW)
- Propellers: 2-bladed constant speed propeller

Performance

- Cruise speed: 115 mph (185 km/h, 100 kn)
- Stall speed: 20 mph (32 km/h, 17 kn)
- Range: 600 mi (970 km, 520 nmi)
- Rate of climb: 1,000 ft/min (5.1 m/s)
- Wing loading: 12.9 lb/sq ft (63 kg/m^{2})
