= Brutsche Freedom 40 =

American homebuilt aircraft design

Freedom 40

General information
- Type: Homebuilt aircraft
- National origin: United States
- Manufacturer: Brutsche Aircraft Corporation
- Designer: Neal H. Brutsche
- Status: Production completed
- Number built: Probably just one prototype

The Brutsche Freedom 40 was an American homebuilt aircraft that was designed by Neal H. Brutsche and produced by Brutsche Aircraft Corporation of Salt Lake City, Utah. The aircraft was intended to be supplied in the form of plans for amateur construction, with a partial kit available.

== Design and development ==
The Freedom 40 featured a strut-braced high-wing, a single-seat enclosed cockpit with a door, fixed conventional landing gear and a single engine in tractor configuration.

The aircraft was made from pop rivetted sheet aluminum. Its 28.00 ft (8.5 m) span wing had a wing area of 112.0 sq ft (10.41 m^{2}) and could be folded for ground transport or storage. The cabin width was 28 in (71 cm). The acceptable power range was 28 to 42 hp (21 to 31 kW) and the standard engine used was the 40 hp (30 kW) Hirth 2702 two-stroke powerplant.

The Freedom 40 had a typical empty weight of 330 lb (150 kg) and a gross weight of 600 lb (270 kg), giving a useful load of 270 lb (120 kg). With full fuel of 10 U.S. gallons (38 L; 8.3 imp gal) in the aircraft's wing tanks the payload for the pilot and baggage was 210 lb (95 kg).

To simplify construction, the design had no complex parts to make and no compound curves to form. In 1998 the plans sold for US$250.00. Completion cost for the airframe alone was estimated at US$3000.00 in 1998.

== Operational history ==
In December 2013 there were no examples registered in the United States with the Federal Aviation Administration and it is unlikely that any exist any more.

== Specifications (Freedom 40) ==
Data from AeroCrafter

General characteristics

- Crew: one
- Length: 18 ft 0 in (5.49 m)
- Wingspan: 28 ft 0 in (8.53 m)
- Wing area: 112 sq ft (10.4 m^{2})
- Empty weight: 330 lb (150 kg)
- Gross weight: 600 lb (272 kg)
- Fuel capacity: 10 U.S. gallons (38 L; 8.3 imp gal)
- Powerplant: 1 × Hirth 2702 two cylinder, air-cooled, two stroke aircraft engine, 40 hp (30 kW)
- Propellers: 2-bladed wooden

Performance

- Maximum speed: 87 mph (140 km/h, 76 kn)
- Stall speed: 30 mph (48 km/h, 26 kn)
- Service ceiling: 18,500 ft (5,600 m)
- Rate of climb: 1,040 ft/min (5.3 m/s)
- Wing loading: 5.4 lb/sq ft (26 kg/m^{2})
