= Australian Lightwing SP-6000 =

Australian homebuilt aircraft

SP-6000
- Australian Lightwing SP-6000 artist's concept

General information
- Type: Kit aircraft
- National origin: Australia
- Manufacturer: Australian Lightwing
- Status: Development ended

The Australian Lightwing SP-6000 (or SP6000) was an Australian kit aircraft under development by Australian Lightwing of Ballina, New South Wales. The aircraft was intended to be supplied as a kit for amateur construction.

By 2017 the project's webpage had been removed and it was no longer listed on the company website. It is likely that development has ended.

== Design and development ==
The aircraft was designed to comply with the Australian rules for amateur-built aircraft. It featured a cantilever low-wing or optionally strut-braced high-wing, a six-seat enclosed cabin, fixed tricycle landing gear and a single engine in tractor configuration.

The SP-6000's fuselage was intended to be made from fibreglass with the wing constructed of 6061-T6 aluminium, with S-glass control surfaces. It was to be powered by a Corvette LS3 automotive engine conversion, a 180 to 200 hp (134 to 149 kW) Lycoming IO-360 four-stroke aircraft engine or a turboprop powerplant. The cabin was planned include an optional toilet and galley.

The initial design was unpressurized, but the company was considering a follow-on pressurized version. The high wing version was to have a cruise speed of 145 kn (269 km/h), while the low-wing version would have cruised at an estimated 250 kn (463 km/h).

== Specifications (SP-6000 Low wing) ==
Data from Company

General characteristics

- Crew: one
- Capacity: five passengers
- Empty weight: 750 kg (1,653 lb)
- Powerplant: 1 × Lycoming IO-360 four cylinder, air-cooled, four stroke aircraft engine, 150 kW (200 hp)

Performance

- Cruise speed: 460 km/h (290 mph, 250 kn)
- Range: 1,900 km (1,200 mi, 1,000 nmi)

Avionics

- Glass cockpit
- Trutrac autopilot
