= Aircorp Bushmaster =

1990s prototype Australian light aircraft

B2-N Bushmaster

General information
- Type: Civil utility aircraft
- National origin: Australia
- Manufacturer: Aircorp
- Designer: C. W. "Bill" Whitney
- Number built: 1

History
- First flight: 28 October 1989

The Aircorp B2-N Bushmaster (Note: Eyre gives the prototype's designation as "BN-2", and that of other two-seat variants as "B2-xx". Jane's sources use the format "B2-N" for the prototype, consistent with the planned production models. This article follows Jane's.) is a prototype Australian light aircraft designed for aerobatic, touring, and utility use. It first flew in 1989 and did not enter production.

== Design and development ==
The Bushmaster is a high-wing, strut-braced monoplane of conventional design with fixed, tailwheel undercarriage. It has two seats, side-by-side, in an enclosed cabin. Fuselage construction is of welded steel tube, covered in fabric, and the wing is all metal. It is powered by a nose-mounted engine driving a tractor propeller. This engine was originally a Norton Aerotor 90 wankel engine, also intended to power production examples.

The prototype, VH-BOI, first flew on 28 October 1989. Certification for the original Norton powerplant was delayed, so it was changed to a Lycoming O-235 after this first flight. The engine change necessitated some other modifications to the aircraft, including changes to the engine cowling and the undercarriage.

The Bushmaster received its Certificate of Airworthiness in late 1990. Production was to take place at Caboolture Airport. However, by early 1992, Aircorp was under financial pressure, which led one of the original partners in the company, Peter Ferro, to buy it out to continue the project.

By 1992, a range of models had been proposed, and the prototype was modified to make it comply with American FAR 23 regulations in preparation for marketing in the US. Production examples were also to have redesigned wing spars, relocated fuel tanks, wings braced with I-struts instead of the V-struts of the prototype, and three-position flaps. Flight testing of the four-seat B4-80 model was anticipated to start in late 1992.

However, by 2007, no further examples had been produced and the prototype was sold off.

== Variants ==
B2-N
Prototype VH-BOI. First flight 28 October 1989 (1 built)
B2-16
Planned two-seat side-by-side production variant
B2-16A
Planned variant with 2+2 seating
B3-16
Planned variant with a single seat in front, with a bench seat for two passengers behind it
B4-16
Planned four-seat variant with a stretched cabin
B4-60
Planned four-seat variant with a stretched cabin and a 119 kw (160 hp) Lycoming engine
B4-80
Planned four-seat variant with a stretched cabin and a 134 kw (180 hp) Lycoming engine

== Specifications (B2-N) ==
Data from Lambert 1991, pp.2-3

General characteristics

- Crew: 1 pilot
- Capacity: 1 passenger
- Length: 6.40 m (21 ft 0 in)
- Wingspan: 10.00 m (32 ft 10 in)
- Wing area: 14.00 m^{2} (150.7 sq ft)
- Max takeoff weight: 811 kg (1,788 lb)
- Powerplant: 1 × Lycoming O-235-N2C four-cylinder, horizontally-opposed, air-cooled piston engine, 87 kW (116 hp)

Performance

- Cruise speed: 185 km/h (115 mph, 100 kn)
