= Australian Lightwing SP-2000 Speed =

Australian light-sport aircraft

General information
- Type: Light-sport aircraft
- National origin: Australia
- Manufacturer: Australian Lightwing
- Status: In production

History
- Variant: Australian Lightwing SP-4000 Speed

The Australian Lightwing SP-2000 Speed is an Australian light-sport aircraft, designed and produced by Australian Lightwing of Ballina, New South Wales. The aircraft is supplied as a kit for amateur construction or as a complete ready-to-fly-aircraft.

== Design and development ==
The aircraft features a cantilever low-wing, a two-seats-in-side-by-side configuration enclosed cockpit, fixed tricycle landing gear or conventional landing gear and a single engine in tractor configuration.

The aircraft fuselage is made from welded steel tubing covered in non-structural fibreglass. Its 8.7 m (28.5 ft) span wing is built from 6061-T6 aluminum covered in doped aircraft fabric and fibreglass. Standard engines available are the 100 hp (75 kW) Rotax 912ULS or the 120 hp (89 kW) Jabiru 3300 four-stroke powerplants. Cockpit access is via gull-winged doors on both sides. Wheel pants are usually fitted.

The SP-2000 has been accepted by the US Federal Aviation Administration as a light-sport aircraft as the Outback 2.

== Specifications (SP-2000 Speed) ==
Data from Bayerl

General characteristics

- Crew: one
- Capacity: one passenger
- Wingspan: 8.7 m (28 ft 7 in)
- Wing area: 12.62 m^{2} (135.8 sq ft)
- Airfoil: NACA 23013
- Empty weight: 395 kg (871 lb)
- Gross weight: 600 kg (1,323 lb)
- Fuel capacity: 120 litres (26 imp gal; 32 US gal)
- Powerplant: 1 × Rotax 912ULS four cylinder, liquid and air-cooled, four stroke aircraft engine, 75 kW (101 hp)

Performance

- Maximum speed: 240 km/h (150 mph, 130 kn)
- Cruise speed: 210 km/h (130 mph, 110 kn)
- Stall speed: 80 km/h (50 mph, 43 kn)
