= Extra EA-400 =

Six-seat, single-engined, high-wing monoplane

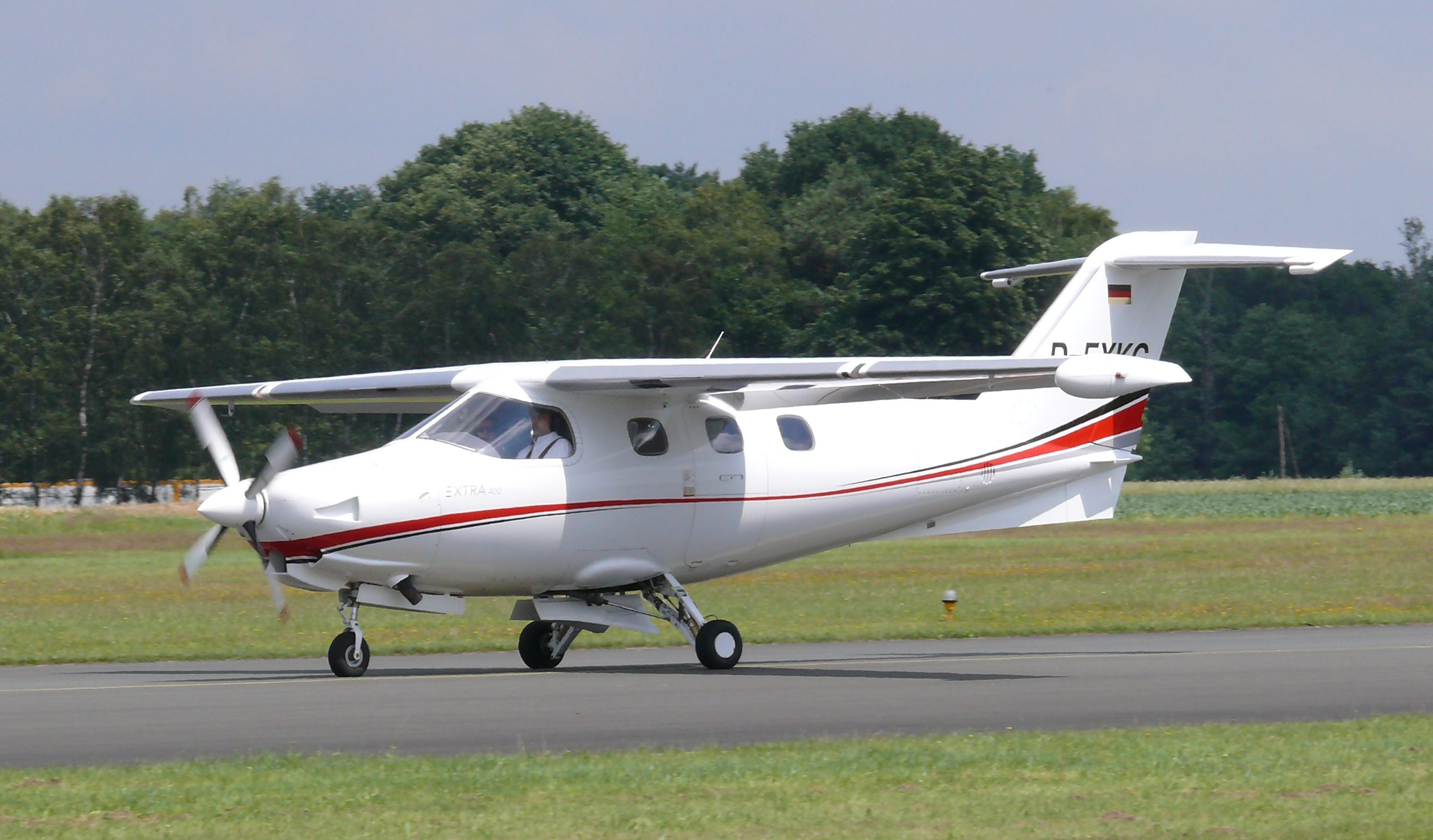

General information
- Type: Six-seat utility aircraft
- National origin: Germany
- Manufacturer: Extra Flugzeugbau GmbH
- Status: In private service

History
- Introduction date: 1998
- First flight: 23 April 1996

The Extra EA-400 is a six-seat, single-engined, high-wing monoplane produced by Extra Flugzeugbau GmbH. The EA-400 is powered by a liquid cooled Continental Voyager turbocharged piston engine.

== Design ==
Started by Walter Extra, the company manufactures mostly aerobatic airplanes like the Extra EA-300 series. The EA-400 is a pressurized airplane for travelling, featuring carbon fiber construction, a cantilevered high wing, and a water-cooled Teledyne Continental TSIOL-550C engine. This engine is immune to shock cooling during descents, but more demanding to operate.

The airframe was designed with engineering help from the Technical University of Delft in Holland under leadership from Prof. Egbert Torenbeek and with Loek Boermans for airfoil design.

The aircraft's Fowler flaps feature a completely recessed mechanism and reduce stall speed from 76 to 58 kn (141 to 107 km/h) at maximum weight.

The landing gear was designed and manufactured by Gomolzig in Germany. It is unusual in its geometry and sealed behind doors once retracted. Its complexity contributes to the aircraft's operating costs.

The optional weather radar pod is blended into the left wing tip. All Extra 400 aircraft have been retrofitted with the flight into known icing conditions modification. Deicing equipment consists of Teflon boots, a heated propeller, a heated windscreen for the pilot side, dual heated pitot ports, and a heated stall sensor connected to the autopilot. The deicing equipment is powered by a pair of large alternators (100 and 85 amps) that also feed the AC compressor located in the tail.

The cockpit has good forward and lateral visibility. Avionics are conventional with a full set of instruments for each of the two crew and a central stack. STCs for upgrades to modern GPS navigators and "glass cockpit" displays are available, but the only autopilot certified is the STEC 55X.

An improved propeller with the "b" type blades is available from MT-Propeller under FAA Form 337 Major Modification. It increases climb performance and cruise speed. Time to climb to FL200 is 20 minutes and cruise speed at 75% power ranges from 200 kn (230 mph; 370 km/h) at 16'000 ft to a maximum of 220 kn (250 mph; 410 km/h) at FL 250 (at MTOW and under ISA conditions).

The passenger cabin is air-conditioned and offers four seats in a club arrangement with a folding table. It is similar in size to that of the smaller jets such as the Eclipse 550.

The Extra 400 was costly to manufacture, requiring 16'000 hours of labor, and carried a price tag of $1 million. Only 27 aircraft were built before the company ran into financial trouble.

== Accidents & Incidents ==
- A fatal accident occurred upon delivery of the first customer aircraft on August 21, 1998, due to flying into a storm, and this caused German authorities to impose a type rating on Extra 400 pilots which was withdrawn in December 2015.
- Another Extra 400 was lost to an engine failure on March 10, 2018, causing the aircraft to ditch in a field in Sharpsburg North Carolina. The sole occupant was not injured.
- A third Extra 400 was lost in Oklahoma on August 4, 2018, due to unknown circumstances that caused the aircraft to lose altitude after takeoff and crash and burn with 5 fatalities.
- Emergency landing on 12 June 2020 after engine failure into a crop field. Due to limited visibility caused by leaking coolant into onto the windshield and unstable descent, the landing gear has collapsed, causing the wings to strike ground and the aircraft subsequently cartwheeled forwards, shearing off both wings. Single person, the pilot on-board was able to walk away from the accident with minor bruises. Aircraft is currently stored in LKPM in damaged condition, possibly written off.
- On 17 March 2025 at 5.22 p.m. an Extra EA-400 crashed on the northern edge of the village of La Punt Chamues-ch (Switzerland) in a populated area and burned out completely. The propeller plane had taken off from Samedan airfield at 5.20 p.m. bound for Roskilde Airport, Denmark. All three occupants of the plane died. The plane had arrived from Denmark on March 13 and was on its return flight.

== Specifications (Extra EA-400) ==
Data from Extra EA-400 Standard Specification, Pilots Information Manual

General characteristics

- Crew: 1
- Capacity: 5 passengers
- Length: 9.57 m (31 ft 5 in)
- Wingspan: 11.5 m (37 ft 9 in)
- Height: 3.09 m (10 ft 2 in)
- Empty weight: 1,500 kg (3,307 lb)
- Max takeoff weight: 1,999 kg (4,407 lb)
- Powerplant: 1 × Continental TSIOL-550-C Voyager

6-cyl. horizontally opposed liquid cooled turbocharged intercooled fuel-injected direct drive piston engine, 261 kW (350 hp) for takeoff, 242 kW (325 hp) continuous

Performance

- Cruise speed: 376 km/h (234 mph, 203 kn) KTAS at MTOW, 75% power, FL180 5,500 m (18,045 ft)
- Never exceed speed: 406 km/h (252 mph, 219 kn)
- Range: 2,000 km (1,300 mi, 1,100 nmi)
- Service ceiling: 7,600 m (25,000 ft)
- Rate of climb: 7.1 m/s (1,400 ft/min) at MTOW - ISA

== See also ==
Related development

- Extra EA-500
