= Extra EA-260 =

EA-260
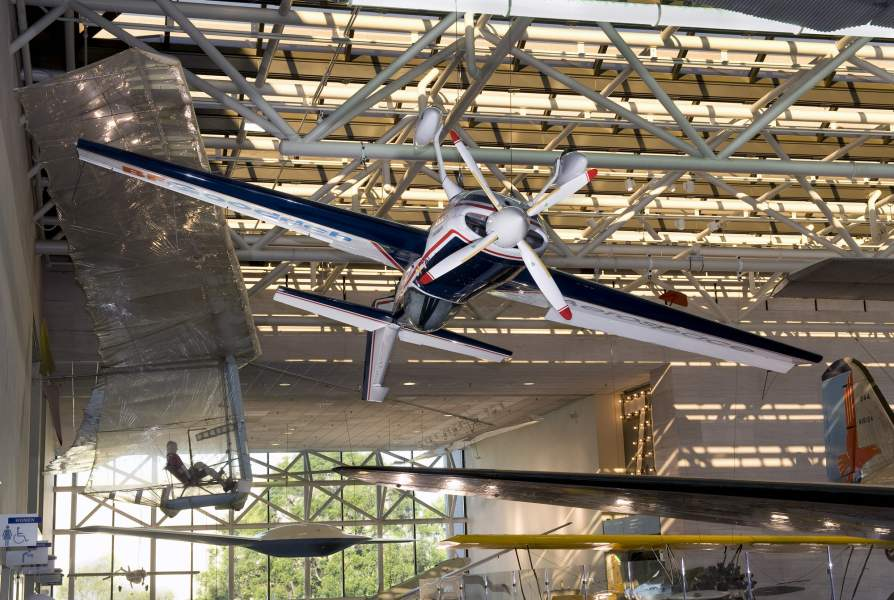
- Extra 260 at the National Air and Space Museum

General information
- Type: Aerobatic aircraft
- National origin: Germany
- Manufacturer: Extra Flugzeugbau
- Designer: Walter Extra
- Number built: 1(4) (by 2021)

History
- First flight: 1986
- Developed from: Extra EA-230

The Extra EA-260 is a hand-built, single-seat aerobatic aircraft derived from the Extra 230 and first flown in 1986. Designed by aerobatic pilot Walter Extra based on the layout of the Extra 230, the Extra 260 is a higher performance version of its predecessor with 60% more power and 18% increase in weight. The first EA-260 was flown by Patty Wagstaff to victory in two U.S. National Aerobatic Championships, in 1991 and 1992, and then retired to the Smithsonian Institution when she obtained an Extra 300S.

== Design ==
The prototype Extra 260 is based on the design of the Extra EA-230, and the two aircraft share many similarities. The Extra 260 has a welded steel tube fuselage covered in fabric with a carbon/glass hybrid composite empennage (i.e., the tail assembly, including the horizontal and vertical stabilizers, elevators, and rudder), and a bubble canopy. The monocoque wings have a Polish pine wood spar with birch plywood skins. A symmetrical airfoil, mounted with a zero angle of incidence, provides equal performance in both upright and inverted flight. The landing gear is fixed taildragger style with composite main legs and fiberglass wheel pants. The piston-engined powerplant is a fuel-injected Lycoming AEIO-540-D4A5 and has a 4-bladed constant-speed MT composite propeller.

== Operational history ==
The first EA260 built, Walter Extra's personal airplane and prototype, was donated to the Smithsonian Institution where it was at one time on display. Patty Wagstaff had ordered and paid for another plane just like the EA260, but the plane delivered was not the same and she declined it. This newer plane, larger and different, was the basis for versions of the EA260 referred to as the EA320 by Patty Wagstaff in her book Fire and Air. She arranged for a deal to trade the new plane and her old EA230 for Walter's personal plane. These are registered with the Federal Aviation Administration in the US, one registered in the United Kingdom with the Civil Aviation Authority and one registered in France with the Directorate General for Civil Aviation, for a total of four.

== Specifications (EA-260) ==
Data from Smithsonian Air and Space Extra 260

General characteristics

- Crew: 1
- Length: 6 m (19 ft 8 in)
- Wingspan: 7.6 m (24 ft 11 in)
- Height: 1.8 m (5 ft 11 in)
- Empty weight: 522 kg (1,151 lb)
- Gross weight: 778 kg (1,715 lb)
- Powerplant: 1 × Lycoming AEIO-540-D4A5 6-cylinder air-cooled horizontally-opposed piston engine, 240 kW (320 hp)
- Propellers: 4-bladed MT constant-speed composite propeller

Performance

- Maximum speed: 405 km/h (252 mph, 219 kn)
