= Stephens Akro =

Single engine monoplane

Akro

General information
- Type: Aerobatic aircraft
- National origin: United States
- Manufacturer: Stephens Aircraft
- Designer: Clayton L. Stephens

History
- First flight: 27 July 1967

The Stephens Akro is a single engine monoplane designed in the United States for aerobatic competitions. It first flew in 1967 and proved very successful, leading to several developments of which one won seven US Championships and one World Championship between 1975 and 1982. The Extra EA-230 and Extra EA-300 were also Akro developments with over two hundred built.

== Design and development ==
The Akro was designed as a homebuilt aircraft for pilots who competed in aerobatic competitions. It was the first U.S. aircraft design to be guided by the Aresti Catalog of manoeuvres for such events. The structure absorbs high stresses, +12/-11g. The Akro is a cantilever mid wing monoplane with a wooden, two spar mahogany skinned wing built in one piece, its forward spar passing unbroken through the fuselage and the rear spar in two parts. The plain, statically balanced ailerons have steel spars with spruce ribs and trailing edges; they are fabric covered and carry ground adjustable trim tabs. The tail unit is a fabric covered steel tube structure, wire braced and with swept, straight tapered surfaces. Like the ailerons, all the rear control surfaces are statically balanced. The rudder has a ground adjustable trim tab. The tailplane is mounted at the top of the fuselage, with variable incidence and a flight controllable trim tab in the elevator.

The Akro has a 180 hp (134 kW) Avco Lycoming AIO-360-A1A air-cooled flat-four engine in the nose, driving a two blade metal fixed pitch propeller. Its fuel is stored in a fuselage tank between the single seat cockpit and the engine. The cockpit has a fixed screen and a rearward sliding bubble canopy. In addition, there is a large window in the forward cockpit floor. There is a fixed, conventional undercarriage, with the mainwheels under glass fibre fairings on cantilever sprung steel legs. Hydraulic disc brakes are fitted. The tailwheel is steerable.

Two slightly different models were designed specifically for the first two customers. The Model A design, begun in July 1966 was for Margaret Ritchie, the winner of the 1966 U.S. Women's Aerobatic Championship and first flew on 27 July 1967. The Model B had less tapered wings of greater area (6%) and bigger ailerons, though of unchanged span, slightly heavier (8%) and with windows in the fuselage sides below the wings. The B also carried 16% less fuel but had a lubrication system adapted to prolonged inverted flight. It first flew on 9 July 1969.

== Operational history ==
The Akro and its developments were one of the most successful aerobatic competition aircraft. Amateur builders began from plans of the Model A or B variants. The 180 hp Lycoming remained the most popular engine but Akros with up to 230 hp motors were produced. The Haigh Superstar is one of several Akro developments as are the Extra EA-230 and Extra EA-300 single seat aerobatic machines. Leo Loudenslager's Akro Laser 200 was a particularly successful development with a 200 hp (150 kW) Lycoming IO-360 engine; initially a standard Akro apart from the engine, it later acquired a different wing airfoil, lightened fuselage and revised, lowered canopy with the decking behind it raised. Flying this aircraft he won the U.S. Aerobatics Championship seven times between 1975 and 1982 and won the World Aerobatics Championships in 1980. Several Lasers have been home built by others.

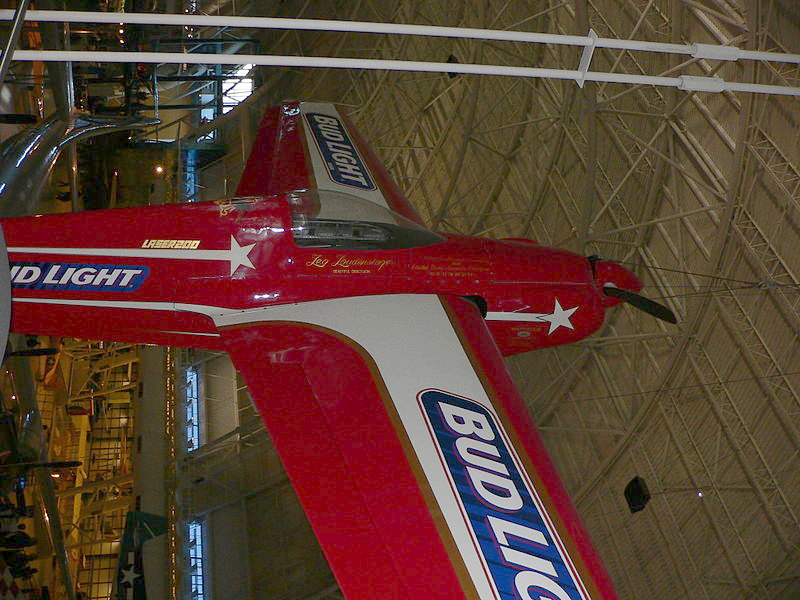
Championship winning Akro Laser 200 at the Steven F. Udvar-Hazy Center

== Variants ==
Stephens Aircraft issued plans for two models:

Model A
as described
Model B
Larger area wing and ailerons, reduced tankage, better inverted lubrication system, extra cockpit windows.

In the amateur tradition, builders introduced their own variations such as bigger engines. Stand out variants/developments were:

Haigh Superstar
Akro Laser Z-200
Multiple US and single World Championship winner, adapted, built and flown by Leo Loudenslager between 1975 and 1982.
Extra EA-230
Further adaptation of the Akro Laser by Walter Extra of Extra Flugzeugbau in Germany.
Extra EA-300
Over 200 of the -230 and -300 produced.

== Specifications (Model A) ==
Data from Jane's All the World's Aircraft 1981-82

General characteristics

- Crew: One
- Length: 19 ft 1 in (5.82 m)
- Wingspan: 24 ft 6 in (7.47 m)
- Height: 5 ft 8 in (1.73 m)
- Wing area: 94.0 sq ft (8.73 m^{2})
- Airfoil: NACA 23012
- Empty weight: 849 lb (385 kg)
- Max takeoff weight: 1,199 lb (544 kg)
- Fuel capacity: 32 US gal (27 Imp gal; 121 L)
- Powerplant: 1 × Avco Lycoming AIO-360-A1A air-cooled flat-four, 180 hp (134 kW)
- Propellers: 2-bladed Sensenich Type 7660, 6 ft 4 in (1.93 m) diameter fixed pitch, metal

Performance

- Maximum speed: 170 mph (274 km/h, 148 kn) at 2,000 ft (610 m): all performance figures at maximum take-off weight.
- Cruise speed: 125 mph (201 km/h, 109 kn) economical at 2,000 ft (610 m)
- Stall speed: 55 mph (89 km/h, 48 kn)
- Never exceed speed: 220 mph (354 km/h, 191 kn)
- Range: 350 mi (563 km, 304 nmi)
- Service ceiling: 21,998 ft (6,705 m) service
- g limits: +12/-11
- Rate of climb: 4,000 ft/min (20 m/s)
- Take-off run: 200 ft (61 m)
- Take-off to 50 ft (15 m): 400 ft (122 m)
- Landing run: 600 ft (183 m)
- Landing run from 50 ft (15 m): 1,500 ft (457 m)
