= Extra EA-200 =

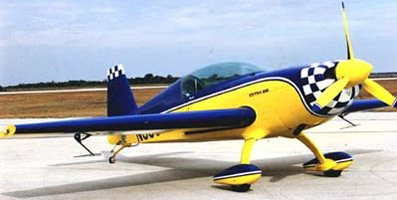
- Extra 200

General information
- Type: Aerobatic Aircraft
- National origin: Germany
- Manufacturer: Extra Flugzeugbau
- Designer: Walter Extra
- Status: Active

History
- Manufactured: 1996-present
- First flight: 2 April 1996
- Developed from: Extra EA-300

The Extra 200 (Type EA-200) is a two-seat, tandem arrangement, low-wing aerobatic monoplane with conventional (taildragger) landing gear fully capable of Unlimited category competition, built by Extra Flugzeugbau.

Designed by Walter Extra, it was introduced to the United States market in 1996. The Extra 200 is slightly smaller than the Extra 300, and is powered by a 200 hp (150 kW) rather than the Extra 300's 300 hp (220 kW) Lycoming engine. It offers the flying characteristics of the EA-300, is capable of all unlimited maneuvers, and makes a great all-round training/sports aerobatic aircraft.

== Design ==
The Extra 200 is based on the design of the Extra 300, and the two aircraft share many similarities. The Extra 200 has a welded steel (4130) tube fuselage covered in fiberglass and fabric with a carbon/glass hybrid composite empennage (i.e., the tail assembly, including the horizontal and vertical stabilizers, elevators, and rudder), and a bubble canopy. The monocoque wings have a carbon fiber composite spar with fiberglass skins and an integral fuel tank. A symmetrical airfoil, mounted with a zero angle of incidence, provides equal performance in both upright and inverted flight. The landing gear is fixed taildragger style with composite main legs and fiberglass wheel pants. The piston-engined powerplant is a fuel-injected Lycoming AEIO-360-A1E that produces 200 hp (150 kW), and it is equipped with a 3-bladed constant-speed MTV-12-B-C/C 183-17e propeller made of laminated wood encased in glass-fiber reinforced plastic. The Extra 200 is stressed for ±10 G with one person on board and ±8 G with two, and has an FAA certified load factor in the US to ±10 G.

== Background ==
In the late 1990s, the Extra 200 was considerably less expensive, at $170,000 (1996 new), versus the Extra 300L's price of $235,000 (1996 new). The Extra 200 is now back in limited production (2007) after a hiatus in which Extra Aircraft focused on the development of the Extra EA-500 whose costs of development forced the company into bankruptcy. With new ownership, the company is again producing a range of aerobatic aircraft including the EA-200. The base price is $225,000 as of 2007.

== Specifications (Extra 200 EA-200) ==
=== General characteristics ===
- Crew: one pilot or two in tandem
- Capacity: two pilots
- Length: 6.80 m (22 ft 4 in)
- Wingspan: 7.50 m (24 ft 7 in)
- Airfoil: symmetrical
- Height: 2.56 m (8 ft 5 in)
- Wing area: 10.4 m^{2} (112 sq ft)
- Empty: 540 kg (1,190 lb)
- Loaded: 800 kg (1,800 lb) (two pilot aerobatic configuration)
- Maximum takeoff: 870 kg (1,920 lb)
- Powerplant: Lycoming AEIO-360-A1E, 149 kW (200 hp)
- FAA/EASA Certified Load Factor: ±10 G with one person on board

=== Performance ===
- Never Exceed Speed: 396 km/h (214 kn; 246 mph)
- Maneuvering Speed: 154 kn
- Stall Speed: 53-59 kn
- Range: 1,080 km (670 mi)
- Service ceiling: 4,573 m (15,003 ft)
- Rate of climb: 686 m/min (2,250 ft/min)
- Wing loading: 83,65 kg/m^{2} ( 17,09 lb/ft^{2})
- Power/Mass: 0,1713 kW/kg ( 0,1045 hp/lb)

== See also ==
Related development:

- Extra 300

Comparable aircraft:

- CAP-10
- Pitts S-2
- Giles G-202
