= Extra NG =

German aerobatic monoplane

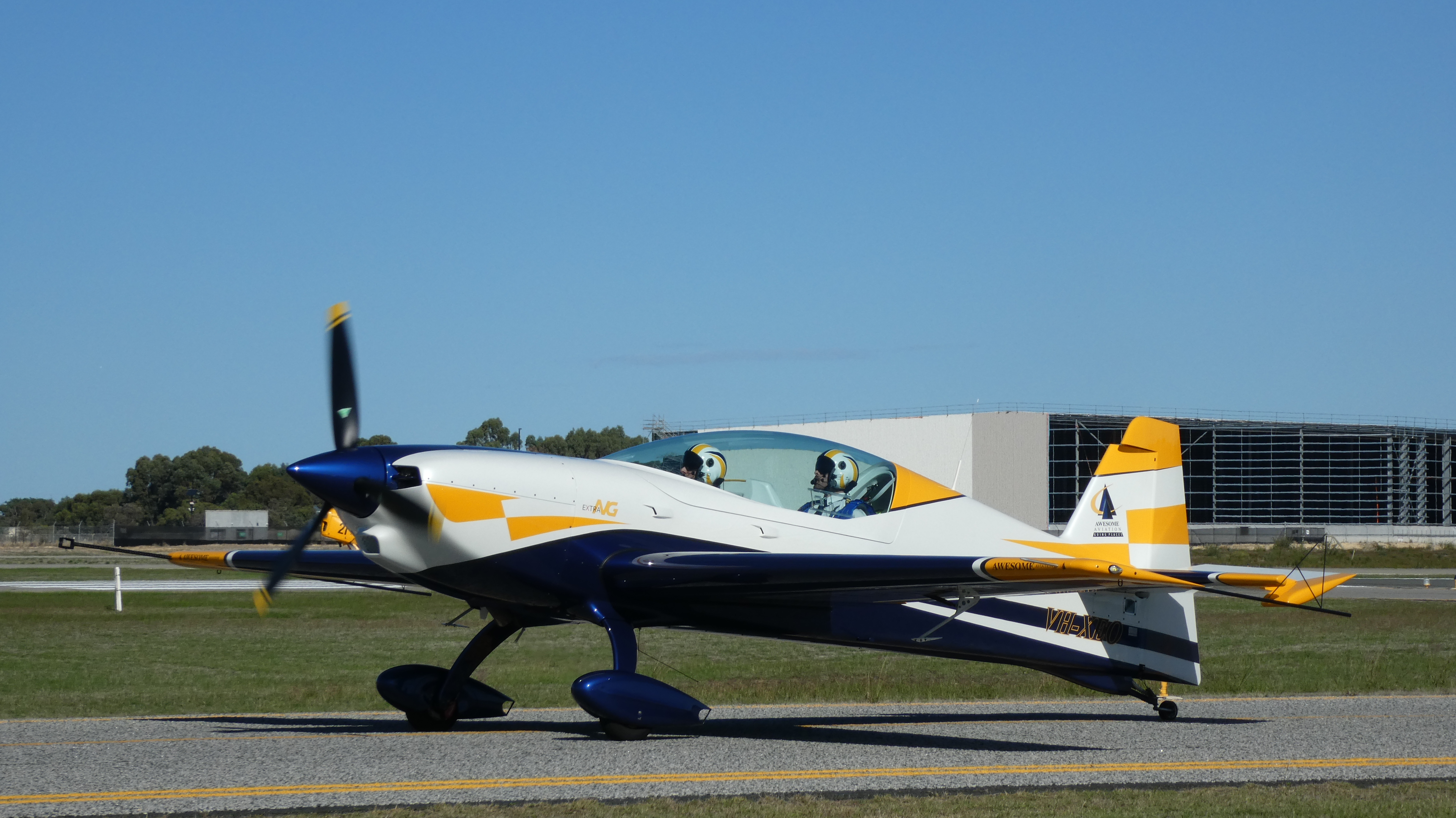
- Extra NG at Jandakot Airport, Australia

General information
- Type: Aerobatic monoplane
- National origin: Germany
- Manufacturer: Extra Aircraft
- Designer: Walter Extra
- Status: Active

The Extra NG is a two-seat German aerobatic monoplane designed by Walter Extra and built by Extra Aerobatic Aircraft.

== Design and development ==
The NG is a two-seat low wing cantilever monoplane of carbon fibre construction. It has a fixed landing gear with a tail wheel and an enclosed cockpit with two seats in tandem (pilot in the rear and a passenger in the front). It is powered by a Textron-Lycoming AEIO-580-B1A engine with either a three or four-bladed tractor propeller.

The aircraft was presented to the public on 22 July 2019 at AirVenture. It received an EASA Type Certificate on 11 October 2019.

== Specification ==
Data from EASA Type Certificate Data Sheet

General characteristics

- Crew: 2
- Length: 7.1 m (23 ft 4 in)
- Wingspan: 8.0 m (26 ft 3 in) 8.3m with optional wingtips
- Height: 2.52 m (8 ft 3 in)
- Wing area: 10.72 m^{2} (115.4 sq ft) 10.94 with optional wingtips
- Max takeoff weight: 950 kg (2,094 lb) Normal Category
- Fuel capacity: 196 litres
- Powerplant: 1 × Textron-Lycoming AEIO-580-B1A , 235 kW (315 hp) at 2,700 RPM
- Propellers: 3-bladed MT-Propeller MTV-9-B-C/C198-25, 1.98 m (6 ft 6 in) diameter

Performance

- Never exceed speed: 410 km/h (250 mph, 220 kn)
- Service ceiling: 3,048 m (10,000 ft)
- g limits: ±10
