= Extra EA-500 =

Type of turboprop aircraft

EA-500
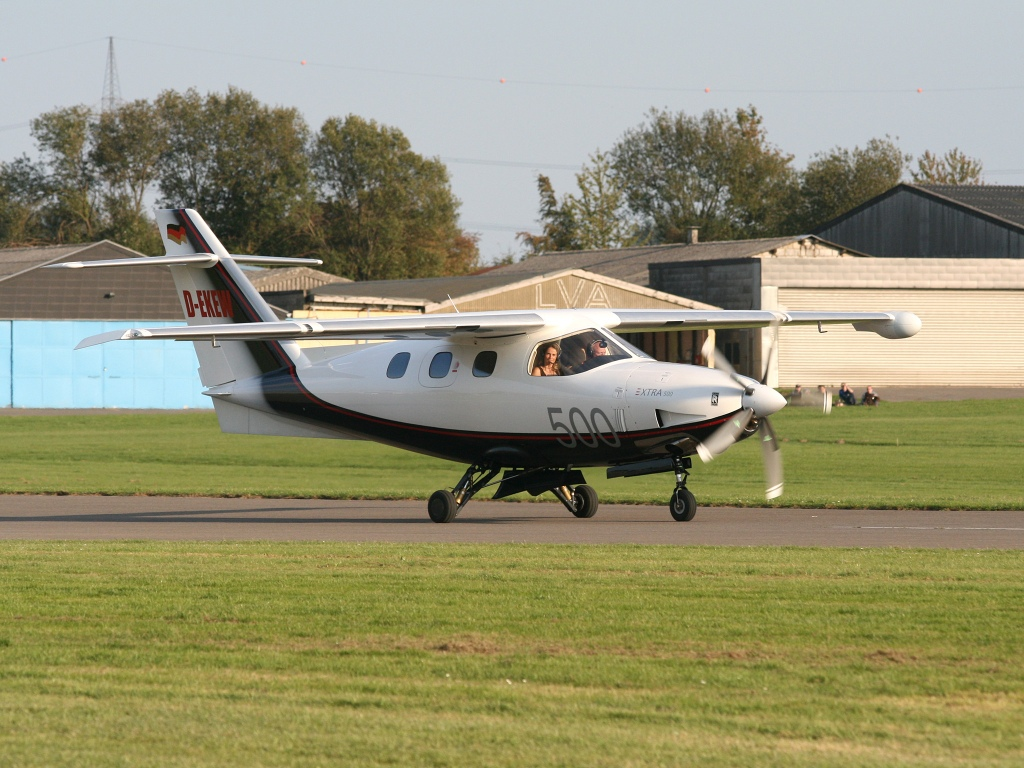
- Extra EA-500 in 2007

General information
- Type: Six-seat utility aircraft
- National origin: Germany
- Manufacturer: Extra Aircraft
- Status: In service

History
- Manufactured: 2002-2015
- Introduction date: 2002
- First flight: 26 April 2002
- Developed from: Extra EA-400

The Extra EA-500 is a six-seat single-engined high wing turboprop aircraft designed by the Extra Aircraft company. In 2015, a decision was made to end production.

== Design and development ==
Started by Walter Extra, the company has been manufacturing aerobatic airplanes almost exclusively with their latest products being the Extra EA-300 series. The company introduced the Extra EA-400 in 2001. This is a cross-country airplane with many exclusive features including carbon fiber construction, pressurized cabin, high strutless wing, and seating for six.

The EA-500 was introduced as an alternative version of the EA-400 with the piston engine replaced by a Rolls-Royce Model 250-B17F/2 turboprop yielding 450 horsepower (340 kW), weighing 205 pounds (93 kg), and driving a 5 bladed propeller. This engine is widely used in small helicopters and was designed to have good fuel efficiency at lower altitudes. This engine's critical altitude is 16,000 feet. However, the Rolls-Royce Model 250 is very light and small at the expense of power. The maximum cruise speed is 225 kn at 12000 feet. The most recent changes to the aircraft come from Avidyne with their latest glass avionics, Entegra R9.

The high wing design was used for a number of reasons, including no wing spar in the cabin and in the event of a dual fuel pump failure, fuel flow is helped by gravity.

The EA-500's cabin is spacious, 55 inches across by 49 inches tall; also the windshield has a fast taper, which wraps up around the two pilots.

The EA-500 has a T-tail instead of a regular tail to keep the elevator surfaces out of the prop wash; therefore minimizing pitch changes due to power changes.

Like the Extra EA-400, the EA-500 is made of mostly composite materials, that mostly being carbon fiber.

The company was planning to produce the EA-500 for the United States market, and was investigating plans to assemble the aircraft in the US.

The EA500 type certificate is currently held by SST Flugtechnik, which provides customer support to the current EA400 and EA400-500 operators.

In 2014 the company sold the design rights to the EA400 and 500 to the Chinese company Jiangsu A-Star Industry Co., Ltd. Extra embarked on training the engineers from Jiangsu A-Star while still retaining the type certificate and providing parts to support to the existing fleet.

The EA-500's approach speed of 90-120 knots and turbine power makes it able to land on 2,000 ft runways.

The EA-500 is also cheaper than its competitors, mainly the SOCATA TBM 850 and Pilatus PC-12.

== Specifications (Extra EA-500) ==
Data from

General characteristics

- Crew: 1
- Capacity: 5 passengers or 730 kg (1,609 lb) payload
- Length: 10.1 m (33 ft 2 in)
- Wingspan: 11.7 m (38 ft 5 in)
- Height: 3.4 m (11 ft 2 in)
- Empty weight: 1,420 kg (3,131 lb)
- Gross weight: 2,000 kg (4,409 lb)
- Max takeoff weight: 2,130 kg (4,696 lb)
- Powerplant: 1 × Rolls-Royce Model 250-B17F/2 turboprop, 340 kW (450 shp)

Performance

- Maximum speed: 435 km/h (270 mph, 235 kn)
- Cruise speed: 419 km/h (260 mph, 226 kn) KTAS at mid weight, 90% power, 3,658 m (12,001 ft)
- Stall speed: 107 km/h (67 mph, 58 kn) KTASKIAS
- Range: 2,963 km (1,841 mi, 1,600 nmi)
- Endurance: 4.9 h full payload, 8 h in ferry configuration.
- Service ceiling: 7,620 m (25,000 ft)
- Rate of climb: 6.78 m/s (1,335 ft/min) at MTOW-ISA

== See also ==
Related development

- Extra EA-400
