= Shock cooling =

Shock cooling refers to the theory that damage to engines (particularly air-cooled aviation piston engines) may occur because of an excessively rapid decrease in temperature.

The situation where rapid cooling arises is on descent from altitude. In this condition, less power is demanded of the engine (it is throttled back) so it is developing much less heat. In a descent, the plane's airspeed increases, simultaneously increasing the cooling rate of the engine. As metals expand and contract under temperature changes, dimensional changes in the engine may exceed tolerance limits.

== Manifestation ==
Damage from shock cooling is most commonly believed to manifest itself as stuck valves, excessively worn or cracked pistons and cracked cylinders and cylinder heads.

== Analysis ==
While the subject is very controversial, some believe shock cooling, as commonly explained, is nothing but a myth. This position is supported by the fact twin engine planes commonly experience ideal conditions for shock cooling during simulated, single engine failures, yet statistically show no difference in wear or damage probability distribution between engines. Doubts have been raised regarding the plausibility of achieving the temperature reduction in cylinder heads during flight that is purported to cause damage in most engines. Equally, it has been pointed out the rate cylinder head temperatures drop off after a normal engine shutdown is often much faster than the usual rates deemed to present a shock cooling risk. Complicating the analysis, high operating temperatures in and of themselves can contribute to excessive component wear and damage, which is typically associated with "shock cooling".

== Detection and prevention ==
A single cylinder head temperature (CHT) sensor, or in more sophisticated installations, an array of sensors, one for each cylinder, may be employed to monitor the temperature and cooling rate of the engine. Spoilers on the wings may also be deployed to lose lift without having to reduce engine power substantially, slowing the rate of engine cooling.
