= Leo Loudenslager =

American aviator

- Loudenslager in 1990
- Born: January 24, 1944; Columbus, Ohio, US
- Died: July 28, 1997 (aged 53); Nashville, Tennessee, US
- Known for: seven United States Aerobatic Championships; 1980 World Aerobatics Championship

Leo Loudenslager (January 24, 1944 – July 28, 1997) was an American aviator. He is one of two aviators to have won seven national aerobatic titles and is one of only three Americans to win the World Aerobatics Championship title.

== Biography ==
Leonard "Leo" Loudenslager was born 24 January 1944, the son of Harry Cameron Loudenslager and Margaret F (Kirkpatrick) Loudenslager. The family resided in Columbus, Ohio. Loudenslager served in the Air Force as a B-52 mechanic. He was stationed at Travis Air Force Base in 1964 when he took leave to attend the first Reno Air Races, where he was inspired to become a pilot. He took flying lessons at the Travis Air Force Base flight club, where one of his instructors was Dick Rutan. In 1966, he joined American Airlines as a first officer. He worked for that airline for the rest of his life.

He completed building a Stephens Akro aerobatic plane in 1970 and competed in his first competition the next year. A series of modifications to the plane, tail number N10LL, culminated in the rechristening of the plane as the Laser 200 in 1975. With the Laser 200, he won seven United States Aerobatic Championships and the 1980 World Aerobatics Championship. He was one of the pilots featured in the 1980 aerobatics movie Cloud Dancer.

Loudenslager also flew in air shows, notably the Sussex Airshow at his home airport in Sussex County, New Jersey. In addition to his Laser 200, he also flew a Bede BD-5J; both aircraft were sponsored by Bud Light.

In later years, Loudenslager's base of operation was at Thompson's Station, Tennessee, approximately 25 miles (40 km) from Nashville.

=== Marriage and children ===
Loudenslager had two children, Kelly and Carolyn, from his marriage to former flight attendant Susan, from whom he was divorced.

=== Death and afterward ===
On June 28, 1997, a car crossed the center line and collided head-on with his motorcycle on U.S. Route 31 near his home in Tennessee. He died a month later in hospital at Vanderbilt University Medical Center.

Loudenslager's plane, the Laser 200, was donated to the Smithsonian in 1999. It was on display at the National Air and Space Museum from October 2001 through April 2003 as part of the Aerobatic Champions temporary exhibit and has been on permanent display in the museum's Steven F. Udvar-Hazy Center since December 2003. Twenty members of the US House of Representatives signed a letter objecting to the plane's Bud Light emblems remaining on the plane, but the museum stood by its position of not altering artifacts except for repair.

The International Council of Air Shows Foundation maintains a scholarship in his name, which is given in rotation to an enlisted member of the US Navy Blue Angels, the US Air Force Thunderbirds or the Canadian Forces Snowbirds to be used toward the cost of flight training.

== Awards ==
- 1975, 1976, 1977, 1978, 1980, 1981, 1982: United States Aerobatic Champion
- 1980: World Aerobatics Champion
- 1982: New Jersey Aviation Hall of Fame
- 1990: Bill Barber Award for Showmanship, World Airshow News magazine
- 1990: Clifford W. Henderson Achievement Award, Cleveland National Air Show
- 1991: ICAS Art Scholl Showmanship Award
- 1991: International Aerobatics Hall of Fame
- 1994: ICAS Sword of Excellence
- 1998: ICAS Air Show Hall of Fame
- Victor Award, National Academy of Sports Editors

== See also ==
- Competition aerobatics
- FAI World Aerobatic Championships
- FAI European Aerobatic Championships

== See also ==
- FAI World Aerobatic Championships
