= Patty Wagstaff =

American aviator

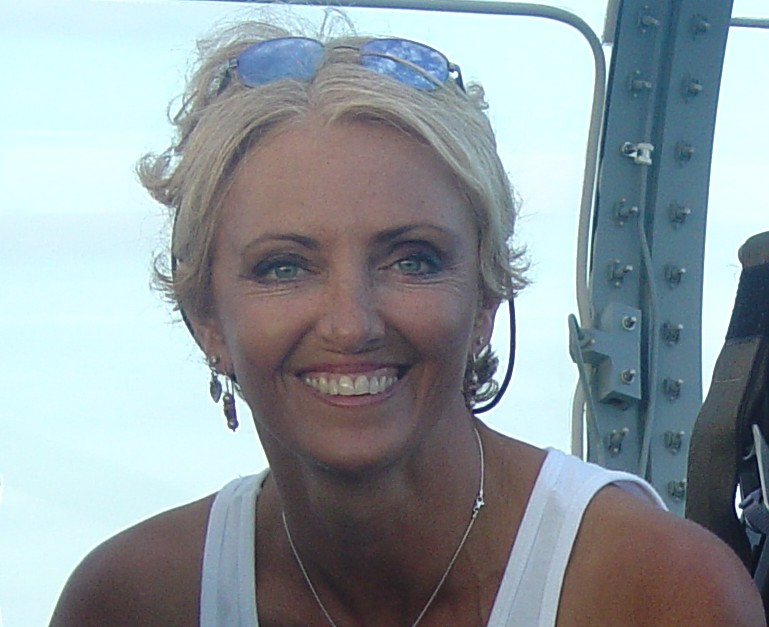
- Wagstaff at the 2004 Stuart, Florida Air Show
- Born: Patricia Rosalie Kearns Combs; September 11, 1951 (age 74); St. Louis, Missouri, United States
- Occupation: Aerobatic pilot
- Years active: 1978–present
- Website: pattywagstaff.com

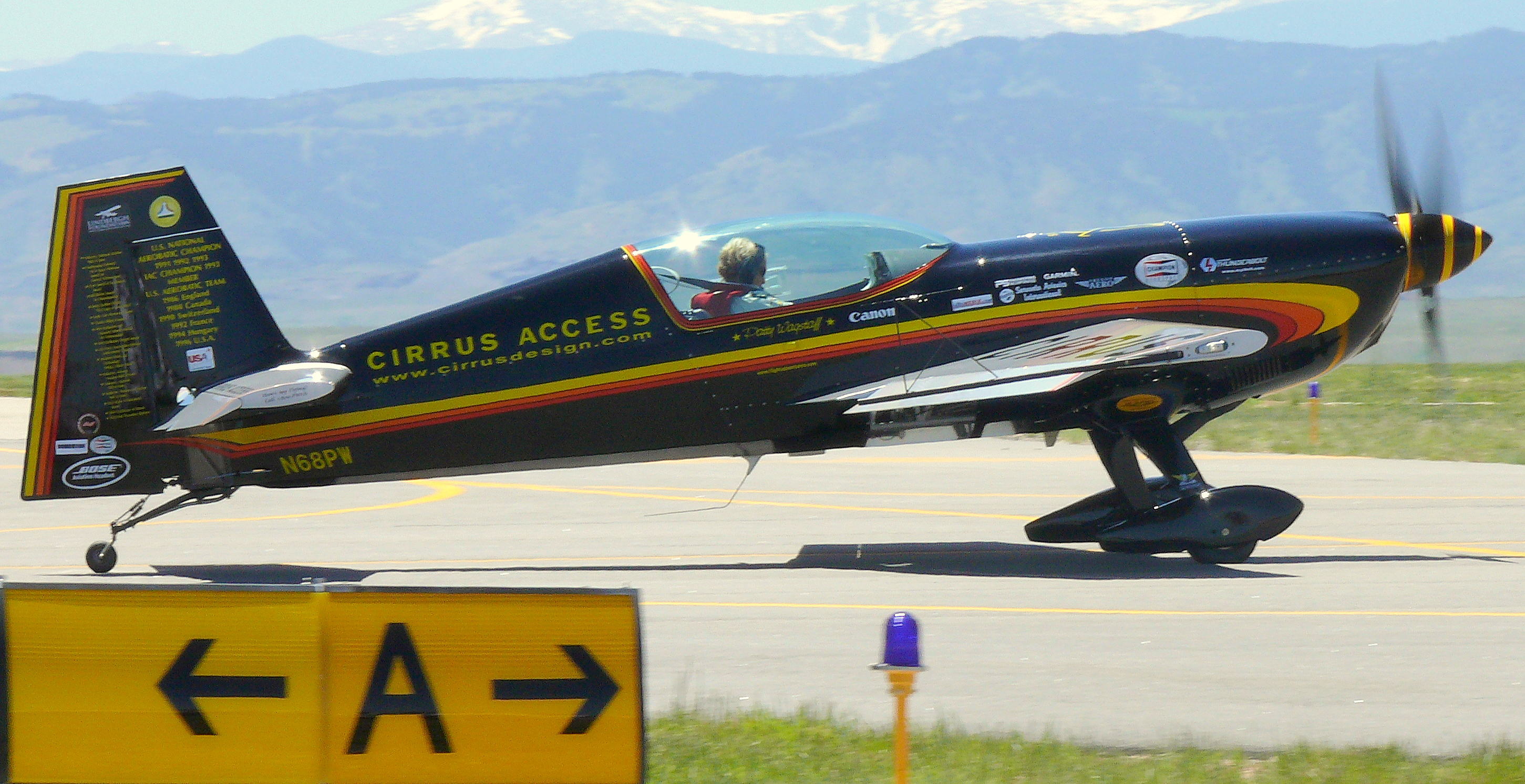
Wagstaff taxiing her Cirrus-sponsored Extra 300 at JeffCo airport in June 2008

Patty Wagstaff (née Patricia Rosalie Kearns Combs; born September 11, 1951) is an American aviator and U.S. national aerobatic champion.

Wagstaff was introduced to aviation as a child; her father was a pilot for Japan Airlines. After graduating from high school in California, she moved to Australia for five years where she traveled up the west coast of Australia in a small single-engine boat with no radio. After moving to Alaska in 1978, she worked for the Bristol Bay Native Association in Dillingham, Alaska where she started taking flying lessons and began her own career as a pilot. Her first flight in a small airplane in the Alaskan bush ended in a crash and that was when she decided to learn to fly. Her first lesson was in a Cessna 185. After earning her single and multi-engine land, single engine sea and commercial and instrument ratings, she became a Certified Flight and Instrument Instructor. Since then Wagstaff has earned a commercial rotorcraft rating and has flown many types of aircraft. She holds type ratings in the TBM Avenger, T-28, L-39 and Tucano. Her sister, Toni, is a pilot for United Airlines.

In 1985, Wagstaff qualified for the US National Aerobatic Team and competed both nationally and internationally until 1996. She was the top U.S. medal winner, winning gold, silver, and bronze medals in international competitions for several years. In 1991, she won her first of three US National Aerobatic Championships, the first woman to win that competition. She was the International Aerobatic Club champion in 1993. The following year, her Goodrich-sponsored Extra 260 airplane was put on display next to Amelia Earhart's Lockheed Vega at the Smithsonian Institution's National Air and Space Museum. From 1988 to 1994, she won the Betty Skelton First Lady of Aerobatics award six times in a row. In 1996, Wagstaff was the top-scoring US pilot at the World Aerobatics Championship. That year, she was also the first person to win the Charlie Hillard Trophy, awarded to the highest scoring U.S. pilot at the World Aerobatic Championships.

In 1997, Wagstaff received her first Hall of Fame inductions, becoming inducted into both the Arizona Aviation Hall of Fame and the International Women's Aviation Hall of Fame. She was awarded the National Aeronautic Association Paul Tissandier Diploma in 1997 and won the Bill Barber Award for sportsmanship in 1998. In 2001, Wagstaff began training pilots of the Kenya Wildlife Service in Kenya. In 2002, she won the Katherine and Marjorie Stinson Award, and in 2004, was elected into what is arguably aviation's most prestigious hall, the National Aviation Hall of Fame. In December 2006, she was inducted into the International Council of Air Shows Foundation Hall of Fame and in 2007, the International Air and Space Hall of Fame at the San Diego Air and Space Museum.

Based in St. Augustine, Florida, Patty Wagstaff Aviation Safety, LLC trains pilots from all over the world in aerobatics, airmanship and upset training. She continues working in the aviation field as an airshow pilot, stunt pilot for films, consultant, flight instructor, and writer. Wagstaff is emeritus board member of the Smithsonian Institution, National Air and Space Museum, and was on the Presidential Advisory Committee to the Centennial of Flight Commission. She flies airshows across North America in a variety of airplanes, including an Extra 300S, T-6 Texan, and a P-51 Mustang. In addition to airshows, she has flown OV-10 Broncos as a seasonal aerial firefighter director in California. She is an instrument-rated pilot and has owned a Beechcraft Baron and a Cirrus SR22 and currently flies a Beechcraft Bonanza.

Wagstaff has been featured numerous times in Microsoft's Flight Simulator series.

== Awards and honors ==
- Inducted in 2004 into the National Aviation Hall of Fame
- Recipient of the 2006 Philip J. Klass Award for Lifetime Achievement
- Wings Club of New York's Outstanding Aviator Award winner in 2013
- International Council of Air Shows' Art Scholl Award recipient in 2023
