= Loudenslager Laser 200 =

1970s American airplane

Laser 200
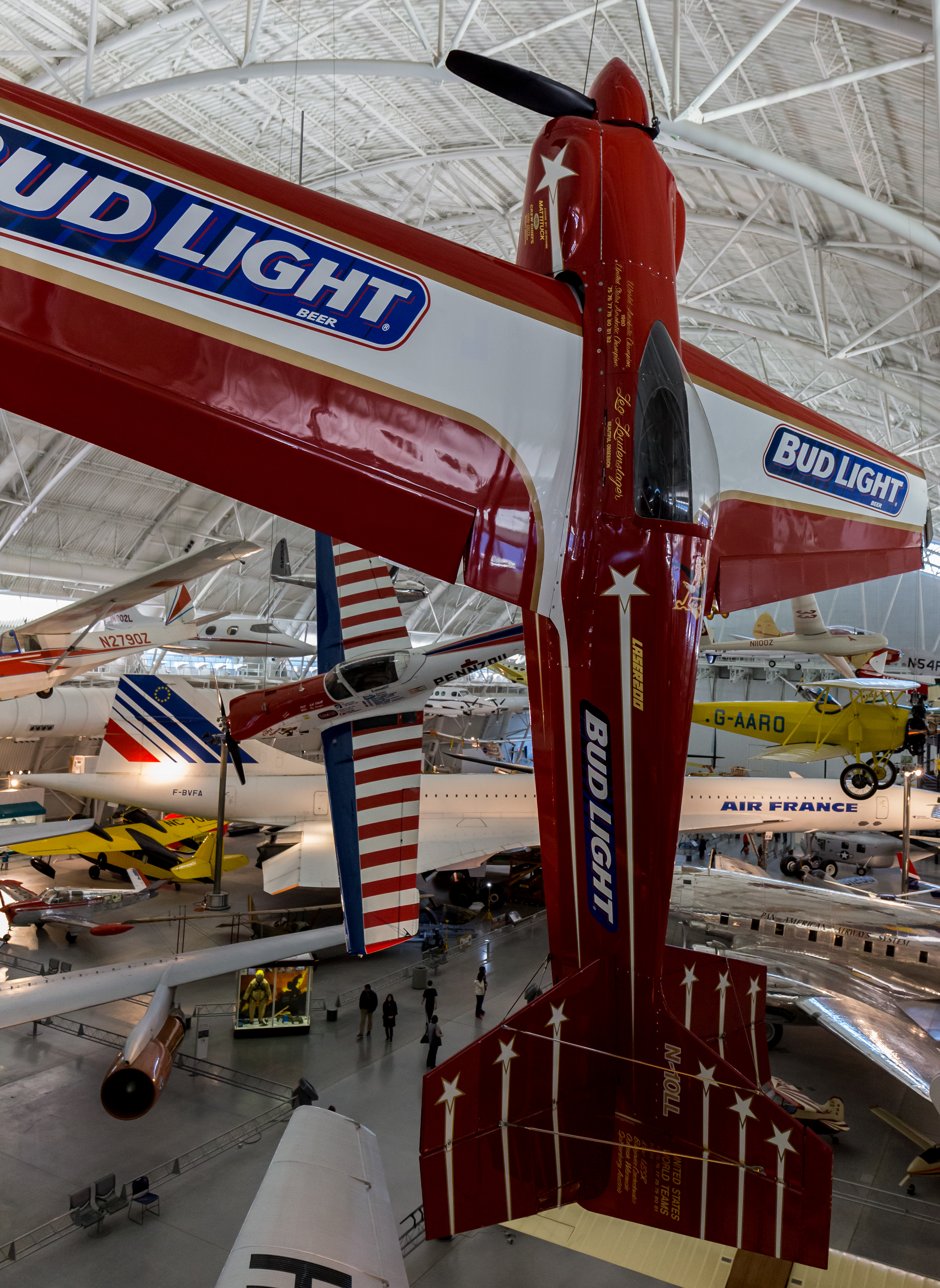
- The Laser on display at the National Air and Space Museum

General information
- Type: Aerobatic Monoplane
- National origin: United States
- Designer: Leo Loudenslager
- Status: Retired
- Number built: 1

History
- First flight: April 1971
- Developed from: Stephens Akro

The Loudenslager Laser 200 is a single place, mid wing, aerobatic monoplane designed and built by Leo Loudenslager. It is constructed of steel tubing and covered with Ceconite fabric.

== Design and development ==
In an effort to perfect the design of the Stephens Akro, Loudenslager conducted modifications to increase roll rate, climb rate, and overall strength while decreasing the empty weight. These modifications included grinding away unnecessary bosses and casting flash, which removed 12 pounds from the engine alone, as well as spot drilling the canopy. A high strength wing was achieved using a single piece wooden spar. Longer full-span ailerons greatly increased the roll rate. The resulting aircraft contained only 10% of the original design, the rest being Loudenslager's own work. The design greatly influenced the next generation of aerobatic aircraft such as the Extra 300, which dominated aerobatics throughout 1990's.

== Operational history ==
The Laser 200 was flown to victory in seven US National Aerobatic Championships, and one World Aerobatic Championship.

== Variants ==
Stephens Akro

Original Variant

== Specifications ==
Data from National Air and Space Museum

General characteristics

- Crew: one
- Length: 26 ft 2 in (7.98 m)
- Wingspan: 28 ft 8 in (8.74 m)
- Empty weight: 842 lb (382 kg)
- Powerplant: 1 × Lycoming IO-360-A1A four cylinder, horizontally opposed aircraft engine, 200 hp (150 kW)
- Propellers: 2-bladed MT Propeller MTV-2B-C/193-02

Performance

- Maximum speed: 200 kn (230 mph, 370 km/h)
