= Kris Sakti =

Kris Sakti Royal Malaysian Air Force
- Malaysian Air Force badge
- Active: 2011 (debut on Langkawi International Maritime and Air Show 2011)
- Country: Malaysia
- Branch: Royal Malaysian Air Force
- Type: Aerobatic display team
- Size: Four pilots

Aircraft flown
- Trainer: 4 Extra 300L aircraft

The Kris Sakti (English: Magic Dagger) is the aerobatic display team of the Royal Malaysian Air Force (RMAF). It made its debut in 2011 at the biennial Langkawi International Maritime and Air Show (LIMA).

== History ==
Prior to the founding of the team, the Royal Malaysian Air Force had another aerobatic team, "Smokey Bandits" that performed aerobatic performances during air shows such as LIMA with the RMAF's Mikoyan MiG-29 air superiority fighters.

== Aircraft ==
During its debut on LIMA 2011, they operated four German Extra 300L aerobatic monoplane aircraft.
