= The Blades (aerobatic team) =

British civil aerobatic team

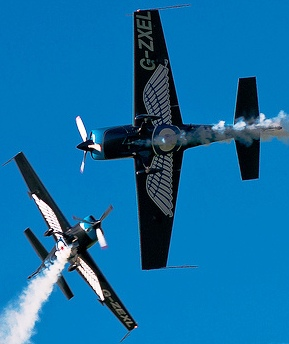
Two planes during a show at the Lowestoft Seafront Air Festival

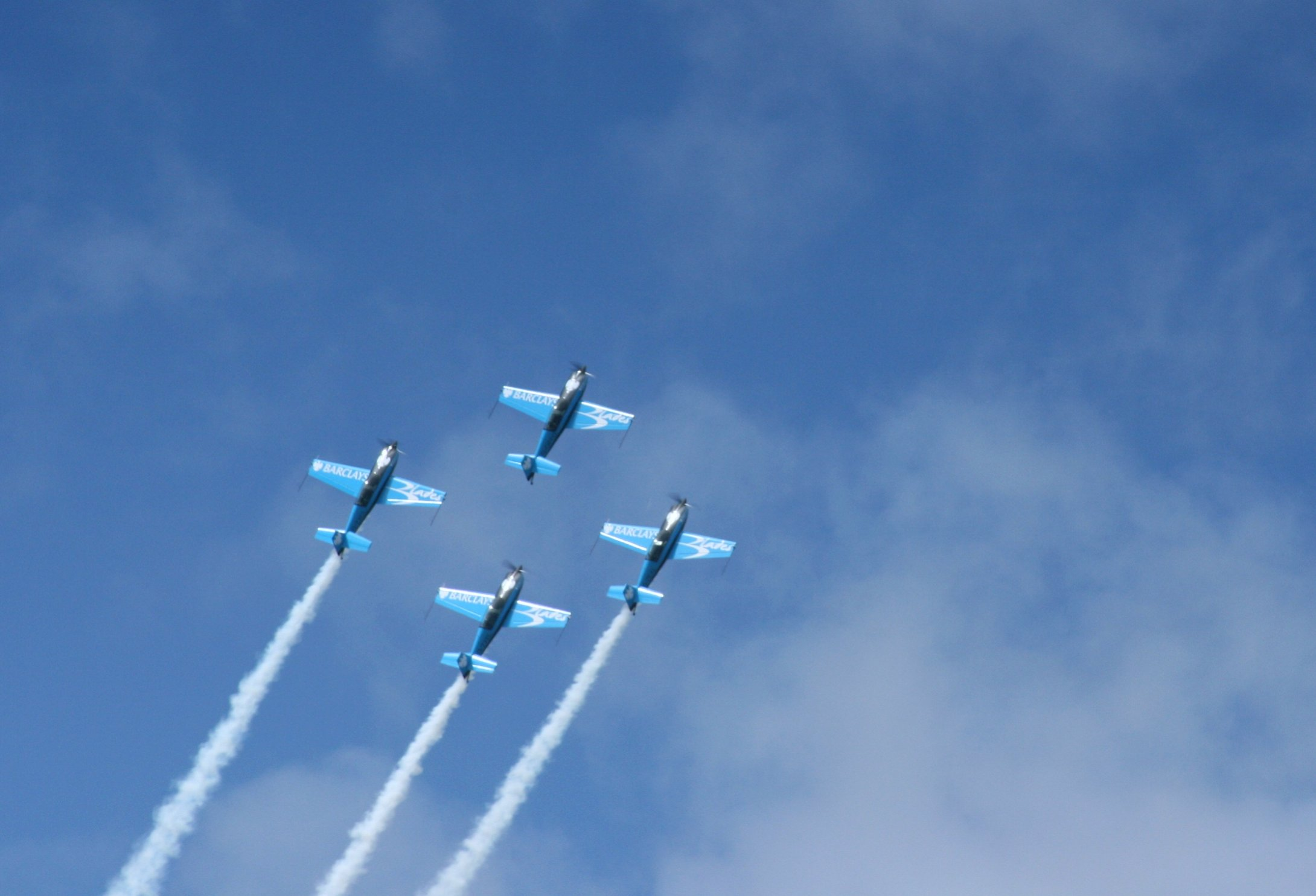
Four planes in formation

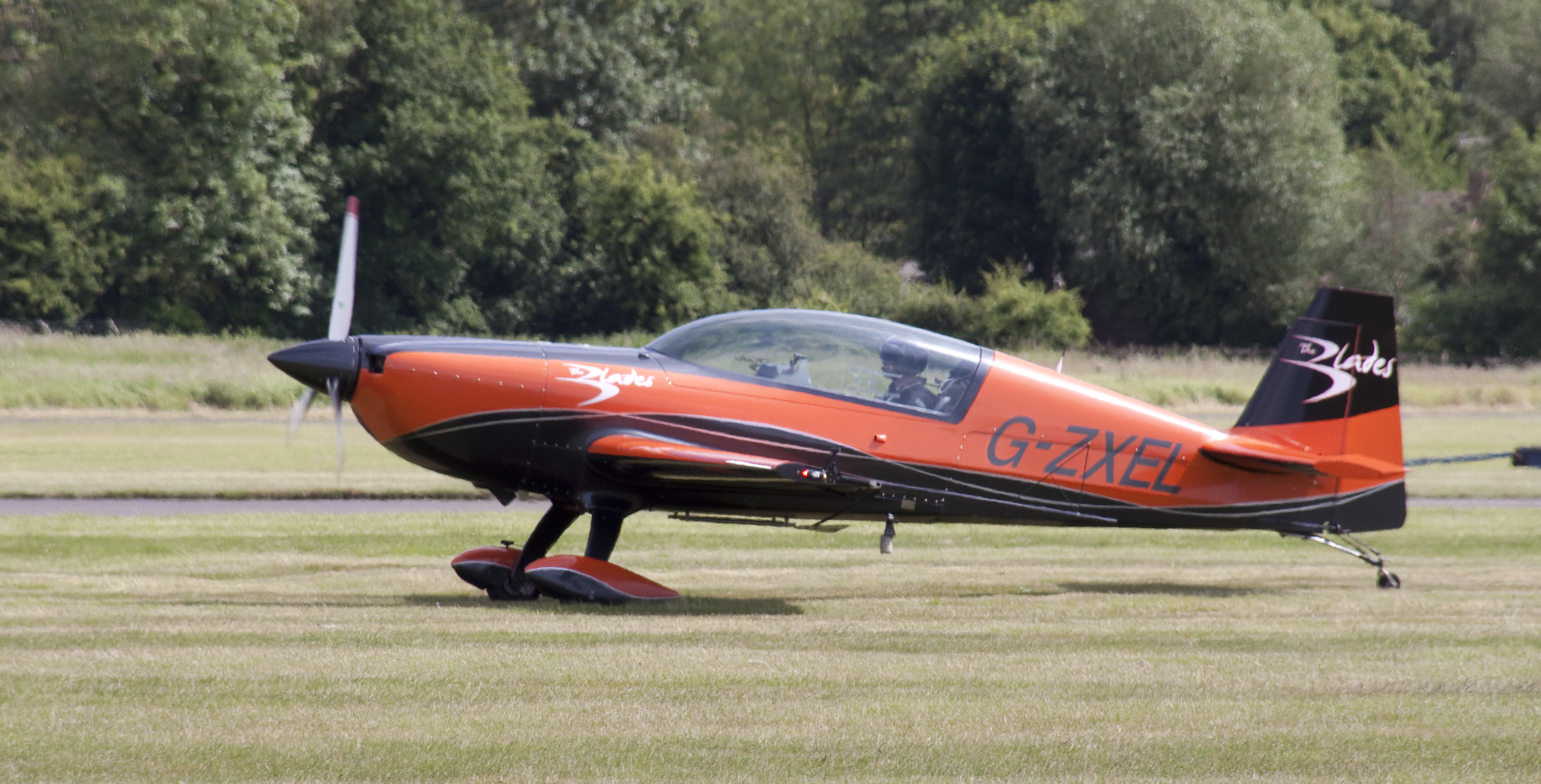
The old orange and black livery

The Blades were a British civilian aerobatic team based at the Sywell Aerodrome in Northamptonshire. They had been described as "the world's only aerobatic airline" and were the only full-time civilian aerobatic team in the United Kingdom. The Blades were a subsidiary of 2Excel Aviation.

The team was founded in 2005 by Andy Offer, a former leader of the Red Arrows, and Chris Norton, a Royal Air Force wing commander. There are eight pilots including five full-time display performers. All of the pilots were former members of the Royal Air Force and the aerobatic team all flew with the Red Arrows.

The team flew four Extra 300LPs and an Extra 330SC, the latter being used for solo sections of the performances. These two-seated propeller aircraft were used for four plane displays as well as corporate flying events during which passengers can be carried on board. The aircraft were originally painted orange and black but later changed to light blue and black. By 2013 they had reverted to the orange and black colour scheme.

The Blades made their debut performance in 2006 at a party held by David Beckham prior to the World Cup. Since then they have performed as part of the 80th birthday celebrations of Queen Elizabeth II at Balmoral Castle, and at the Bahrain Grand Prix and Cannes Lions International Advertising Festival. They hold the world record for formation looping having completed 26 consecutive loops, with blind bank manager Mike Newman taking control for the beginning of the stunt before co-pilot Myles Garland resumed control for the other loops.

Alongside their aerobatic displays and commercial work, The Blades also helped the Royal Air Forces Association, a charity that supports RAF service personnel.

The Blades featured in the Yorkshire Tea adverts from 2013 to 2015.

On 23 January 2023, the team announced that 2022 would be their final full season.

== See also ==
- Ben Murphy (aviator) – Pilot of The Blades aerobatic team, and master class of the Red Bull Air Race World Championship.
