= Aircraft engine controls =

Instruments used to control an aircraft engine

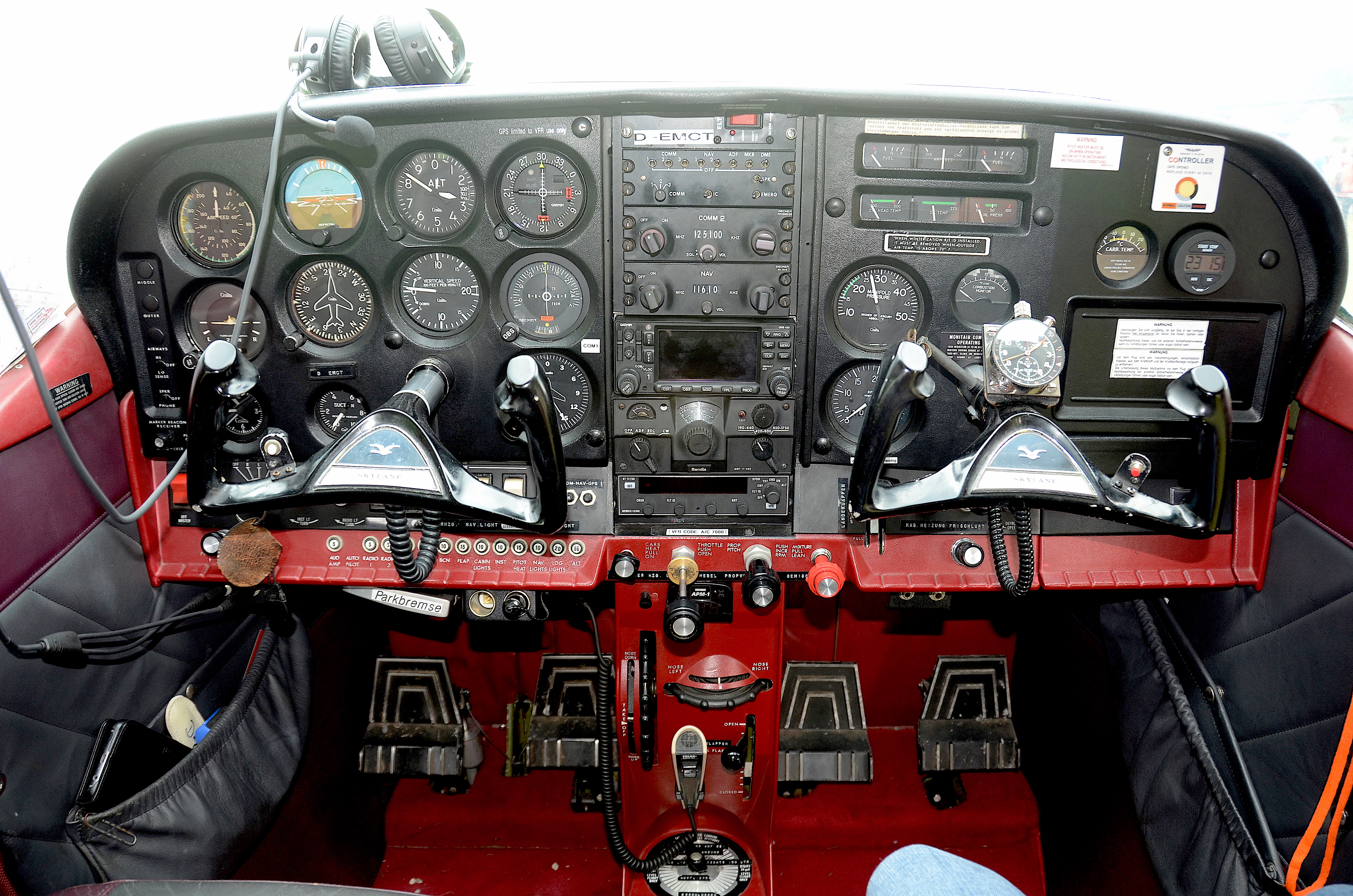
Aircraft instrument panel with engine controls and indicators of a Cessna 182D Skylane

Aircraft engine controls provide a means for the pilot to control and monitor the operation of the aircraft's powerplant. This article describes controls used with a basic internal-combustion engine driving a propeller. Some optional or more advanced configurations are described at the end of the article. Jet turbine engines use different operating principles and have their own sets of controls and sensors.

== Basic controls and indicators ==
- Throttle control - Sets the desired power level normally by a lever in the cockpit. In carburetted engines the lever is called throttle lever and controls the mass flow rate of the air-fuel mixture delivered to the cylinders by the amount of throttle valve opening. In engines with fuel injection system, the lever is typically referred to as power lever and controls the amount of fuel that is injected into the cylinders.
- Propeller control or Governor - Adjusts the propeller blade pitch and regulates the engine load as necessary to maintain the set revolutions per minute (RPM). See the section on propeller below for details.
- Mixture control - Sets the amount of fuel added to the intake airflow. At higher altitudes, the air pressure (and therefore the oxygen level) declines so the fuel volume must also be reduced to give the correct air–fuel mixture. This process is known as "leaning".
- Master switch - Most often actually two separate switches, the battery master and the alternator master. The battery master activates a relay (sometimes called the battery contactor) which connects the battery to the aircraft's main electrical bus. The alternator master activates the alternator by applying power to the alternator field circuit. These two switches provide electrical power to all the systems in the aircraft.
- Ignition switch - Activates the magnetos by opening the grounding or 'p-lead' circuit; with the p-lead ungrounded the magneto is free to send its high-voltage output to the spark plugs. In most aircraft the ignition switch also applies power to the starter motor during engine start. In piston aircraft engines, the battery does not generate the spark for combustion. This is accomplished using devices called magnetos. Magnetos are connected to the engine by gearing. When the crankshaft turns, it turns the magnetos which mechanically generate voltage for spark. In the event of an electrical failure, the engine will continue to run. The Ignition Switch has the following positions:
  1. Off - Both magneto p-leads are connected to electrical ground. This disables both magnetos, no spark is produced.
  2. Right - The left magneto p-lead is grounded, and the right is open. This disables the left magneto and enables the right magneto only.
  3. Left - The right magneto p-lead is grounded, and the left is open. This disables the right magneto and enables the left magneto only.
  4. Both - This is the normal operating configuration, both p-leads are open, enabling both magnetos.
  5. Start - The pinion gear on the starter motor is engaged with the flywheel and the starter motor runs to turn the engine over. In most cases, only the left magneto is active (the right p-lead is grounded) due to timing differences between the magnetos at low RPMs.
- Tachometer - A gauge to indicate engine speed in RPM or percentage of maximum.
- Manifold pressure (MP) gauge - Indicates the absolute pressure in the intake manifold. For an aircraft equipped with a constant speed propeller, this is the most direct indication of the engine's operating power. A fully open throttle would show a manifold pressure roughly equal to the ambient air pressure, i.e. full power; note that the maximum therefore changes with altitude unless the engine is equipped with a turbocharger or similar intake air pressure increasing system. As the throttle is closed, this pressure is reduced due to restricting the fuel/air mixture available to the engine, i.e. causing it to operate at lower power than it is capable of producing.
- Oil temperature gauge - Indicates the engine oil temperature.
- Oil pressure gauge - Indicates the supply pressure of the engine lubricant.
- Exhaust gas temperature (EGT) gauge - Indicates the temperature of the exhaust gas just after combustion. If only one reading is provided, it measures the typically hottest cylinder's exhaust. Used to set the air-fuel mixture (leaning) correctly.
- Cylinder head temperature (CHT) gauge - Indicates the temperature of at least one of the cylinder heads. The CHT is most directly affected by the volume and temperature of airflow passing over the air-cooled cylinder heads. Most high-performance engines provide adjustable cowl flaps to manage this airflow and thereby maintain an appropriate CHT.
- Carburetor heat control - Controls the application of heat to the carburetor venturi area to remove or prevent the formation of ice in the throat of the carburetor as well as bypassing the air filter in case of impact icing.
- Alternate air - Bypasses the air filter on a fuel-injected engine.

== Fuel ==
- Fuel control switch – A switch with positions labeled "run" and "cutoff" that controls whether fuel is supplied to an engine.
- Fuel primer pump – A manual pump to add a small amount of fuel at the cylinder intakes to assist in starting a cold engine. Fuel-injected engines do not have this control. For fuel-injected engines, a fuel boost pump is used to prime the engine prior to start.
- Fuel quantity gauge – Indicates the amount of fuel remaining in the identified tank. One per fuel tank. Some aircraft use a single gauge for all tanks, with a selector switch that can be turned to select the tank one wishes to have displayed on the shared gauge, including a setting to show the total fuel in all tanks. An example of switch settings could be "Left, Right, Fuselage, Total". This saves room on the instrument panel by negating the need for four different dedicated fuel gauges.
- Fuel select valve – Connects the fuel flow from the selected tank to the engine.

If the aircraft is equipped with a fuel pump:

- Fuel pressure gauge – Indicates the supply pressure of fuel to the carburetor (or in the case of a fuel-injected engine, to the fuel controller.)
- Fuel boost pump switch – Controls the operation of the auxiliary electric fuel pump to provide fuel to the engine before it starts or in case of failure of the engine-powered fuel pump. Some large aeroplanes have a fuel system that allows the flight crew to jettison or dump the fuel. When operated, the boost pumps in the fuel tanks pump the fuel to the dump chutes or jettison nozzles and overboard to the atmosphere.

== Propeller ==
In an aircraft with a fixed-pitch propeller, there is no direct control over the propeller rotational speed, which depends on the airspeed and loading. Therefore, the pilot has to pay attention to the RPM indicator and adjust the throttle/power lever in order to maintain the desired constant speed of the propeller. For example, when the airspeed reduces and the loading increases (e.g., in a climb), RPM will decrease and the pilot has to increase the throttle/power. When the airspeed increases and the loading decreases (e.g., in a dive), the RPM will increase and the pilot has to decrease the throttle/power in order to prevent RPM from exceeding the operational limits and damaging the motor.

If the aircraft is equipped with adjustable-pitch or constant-speed propeller(s):

- Blade pitch control - Maximizes the efficiency of the propeller in different operational conditions (i.e., airspeed) by controlling the desired propeller rotational speed. In adjustable-pitch propeller control system, the pilot has to adjust the propeller pitch angle and thus angle of attack of the propeller blades (typically with a lever) to achieve the desired propeller rotational speed. The increased pitch (blade angle of attack) increases the load on the engine and therefore slows it down, and vice versa. However, the actual propeller speed remains stable only if operational conditions (e.g., airspeed) do not change, otherwise the pilot has to constantly adjust the pitch to maintain the desired propeller speed. Constant-speed propeller control system simplifies this for the pilot by introducing a propeller governor, where the lever controls the desired propeller speed instead of the pitch angle. Once the pilot has set the desired propeller speed, the propeller governor maintains that propeller speed by adjusting the pitch of the propeller blades, using the engine's oil pressure to move a hydraulic piston in the propeller hub. Many modern aircraft use single-lever power control (SLPC) system, where on-board computer (FADEC) automatically manages the propeller speed based on the desired power setting and operational conditions. The output power from the propeller is equal to a product of propeller efficiency and input power from the engine.
- Manifold pressure gauge - When the engine is running normally, there is a good correlation between the intake manifold pressure and the torque the engine is developing. The input power into the propeller is equal to a product of propeller rotational speed and torque.

== Cowl ==
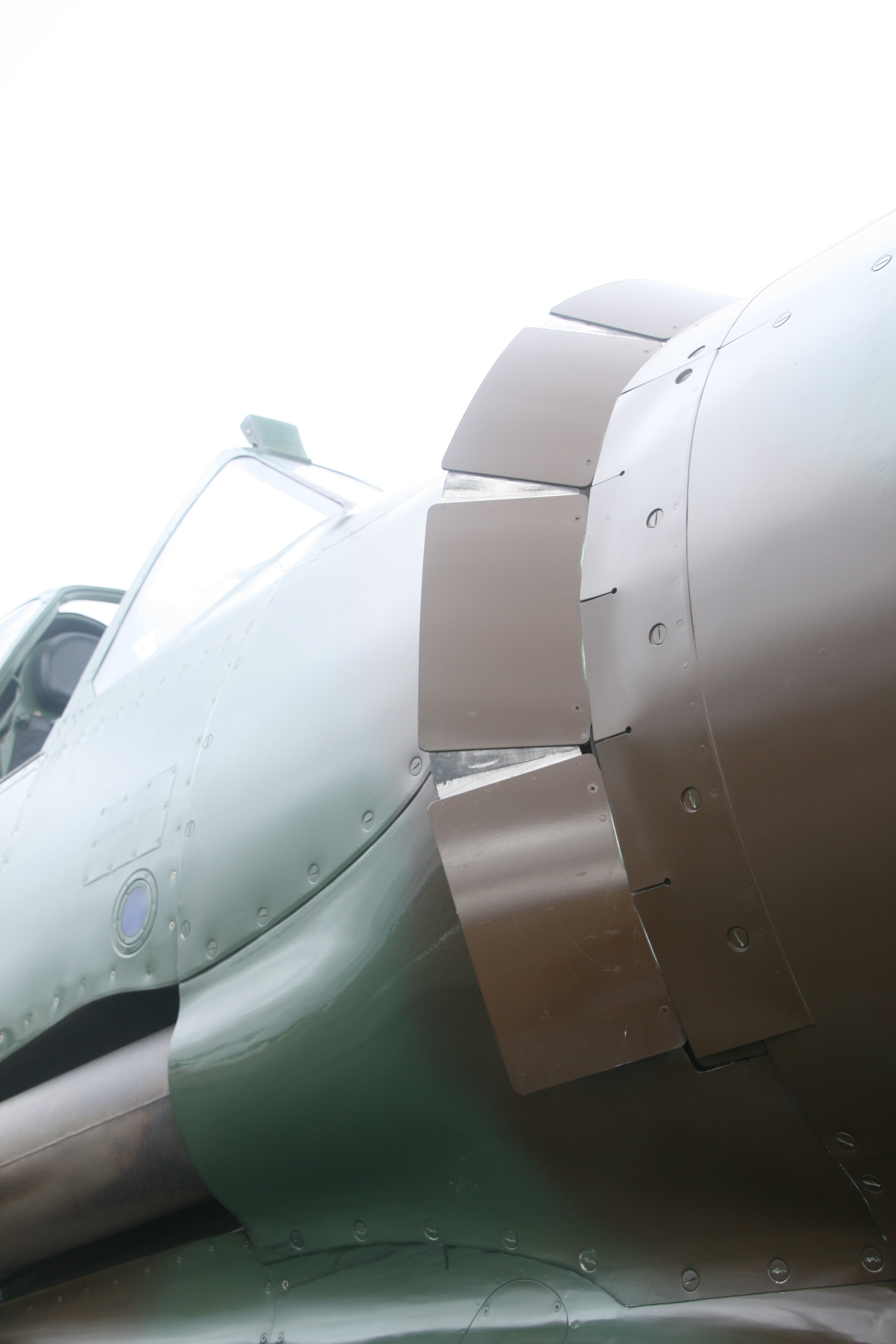
Front view of open cowl flaps

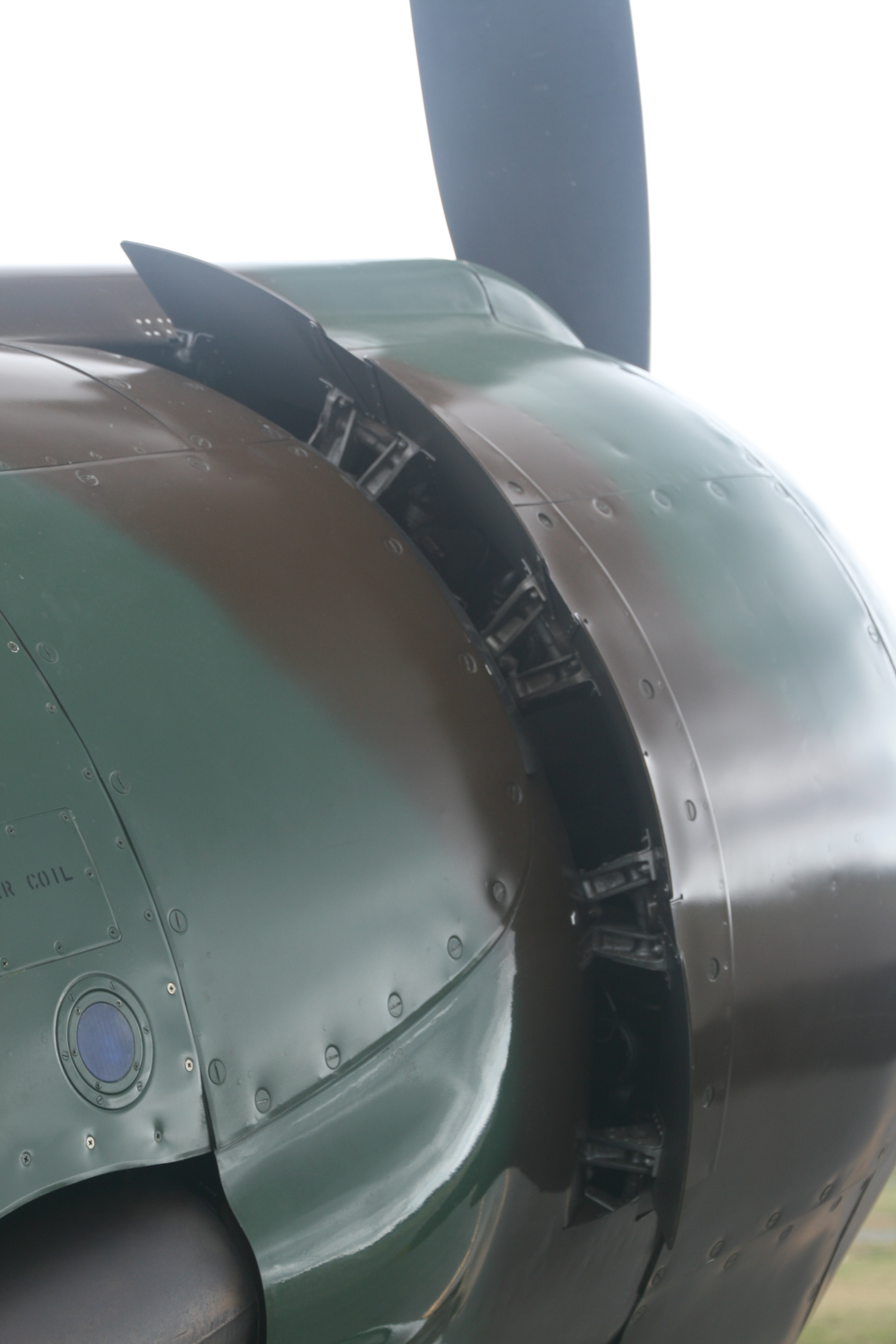
Rear view of open cowl flaps

If the aircraft is equipped with adjustable Cowl Flaps:

- Cowl flap position control - Cowl Flaps are opened during high power/low airspeed operations like takeoff to maximize the volume of cooling airflow over the engine's cooling fins.
- Cylinder head temperature gauge - Indicates the temperature of all cylinder heads or on a single CHT system, the hottest head. A Cylinder Head Temperature Gauge has a much shorter response time than the oil temperature gauge, so it can alert the pilot to a developing cooling issue more quickly. Engine overheating may be caused by:
  1. Running too long at a high power setting.
  2. Poor leaning technique.
  3. Restricting the volume of cooling airflow too much.
  4. Insufficient delivery of lubricating oil to the engine's moving parts.

== See also ==
- Piston engine
- Aeronautics
- Aircraft flight control system
