= Extra EA-230 =

230
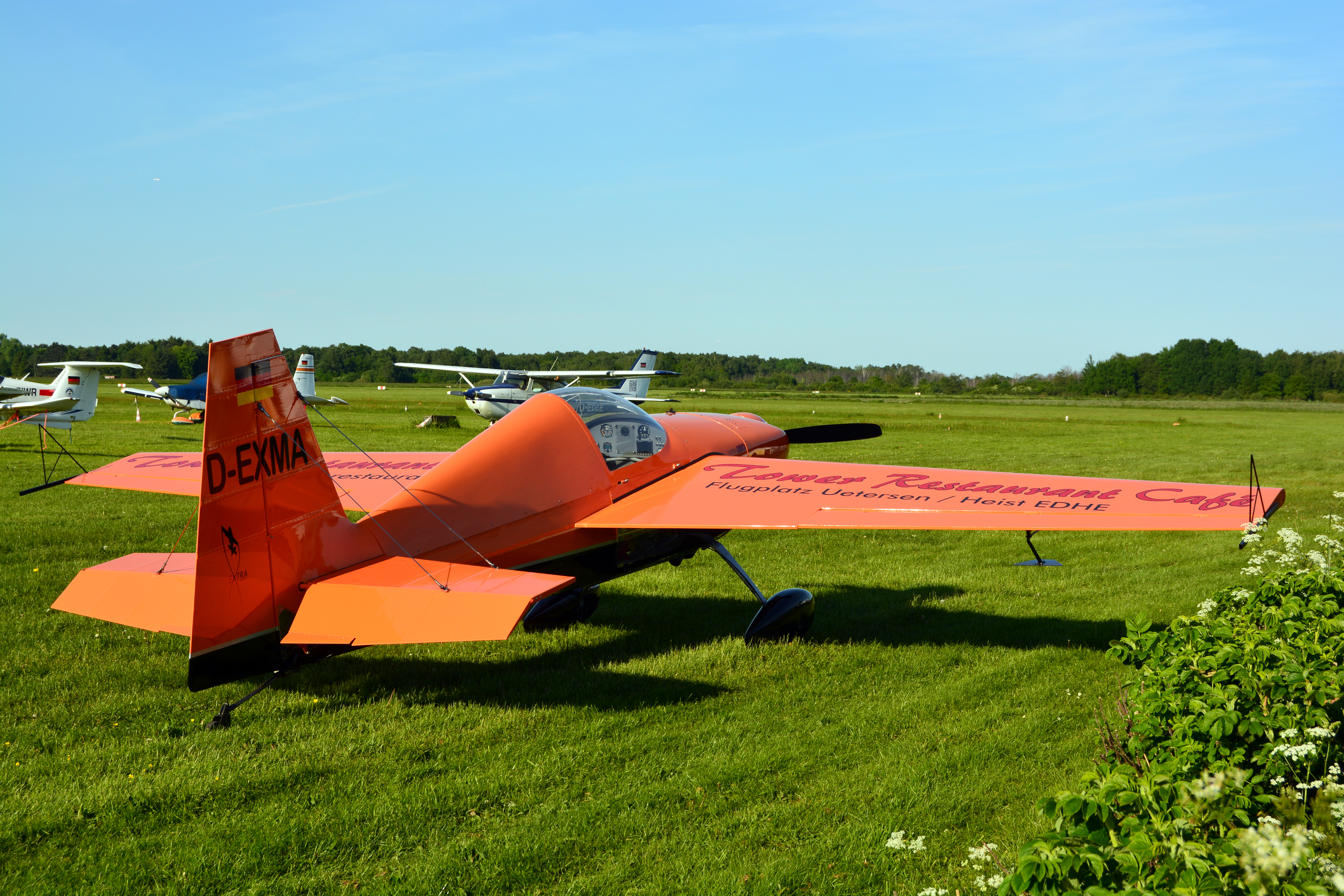

General information
- Type: Aerobatic sportsplane
- Manufacturer: Extra
- Designer: Walter Extra
- Status: Active

History
- Manufactured: 1983-1990
- First flight: 14 July 1983

The Extra 230 was a single-seat aerobatic aircraft developed in Germany in the early 1980s. Designed by aerobatic pilot Walter Extra based on the layout of the Laser 200 he was previously flying, the Extra 230 was a conventional (if short-coupled) mid-wing cantilever monoplane with fixed tailwheel undercarriage and a wire-braced empennage. The fuselage and empennage were of steel tube construction, but the wings were wooden. Production continued until 1990, at which time it was replaced by the Extra 300

== Specifications ==
Data from Jane's All The World's Aircraft 1990–1991

General characteristics

- Crew: 1
- Length: 5.82 m (19 ft 1 in)
- Wingspan: 7.40 m (24 ft 3 in)
- Height: 1.73 m (5 ft 8 in)
- Airfoil: MA 15S (root), MA12S (tip)
- Empty weight: 440 kg (970 lb)
- Max takeoff weight: 560 kg (1,235 lb)
- Fuel capacity: 80 L (21 US gal; 18 imp gal)
- Powerplant: 1 × Lycoming AEIO-360-A1E air-cooled flat-four, 150 kW (200 hp)
- Propellers: 2-bladed Mühlbauer constant-speed propeller

Performance

- Maximum speed: 352 km/h (219 mph, 190 kn) IAS
- Stall speed: 71 km/h (44 mph, 38 kn) IAS
- Never exceed speed: 407 km/h (253 mph, 220 kn)
- Endurance: 2 hr 30 min
- g limits: +10, -10
- Roll rate: 200 degrees/sec
- Rate of climb: 15.0 m/s (2,950 ft/min)
