= Cylinder Head Temperature gauge =

Temperature monitoring device for cylinder heads of an engine

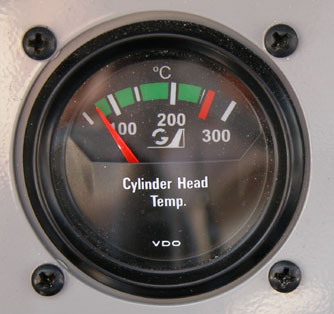
Analog Cylinder Head Temperature gauge

A Cylinder Head Temperature gauge (CHT) measures the cylinder head temperature of an engine. Commonly used on air-cooled engines, the head temperature gauge displays the work that the engine is performing more quickly than an oil or water temperature gauge. As the engine works at high speed or uphill, head temperature will increase quickly. The meter can be digital or analog.

An air-cooled engine requires a steady flow of air for cooling. Most air-cooled engines have thermostats controlling air doors or flaps to help the engine reach operating temperature as quickly as possible. Any failure of the cooling system will cause engine failure via scuffed piston skirts. Air-cooled engines are used in aircraft engine control and other air-cooled engines as in cars and air-cooled motorcycles.

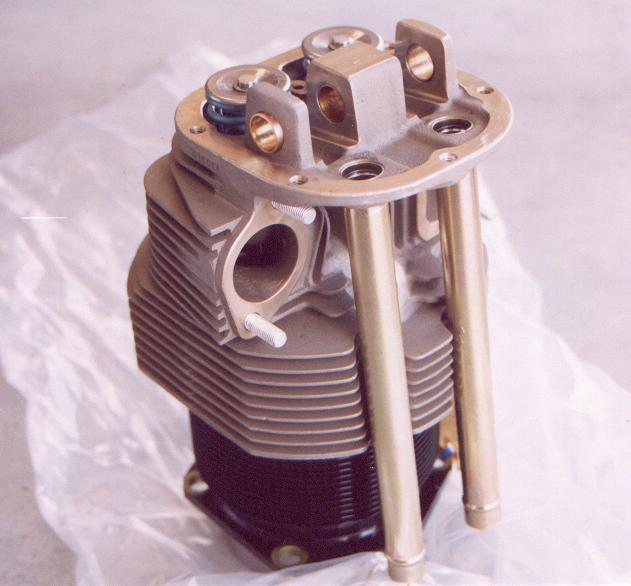
A cylinder from an air-cooled aviation engine, a Continental C85. Notice the rows of fins on both the steel cylinder barrel and the aluminum cylinder head. The fins provide additional surface area for air to pass over the cylinder and absorb heat.

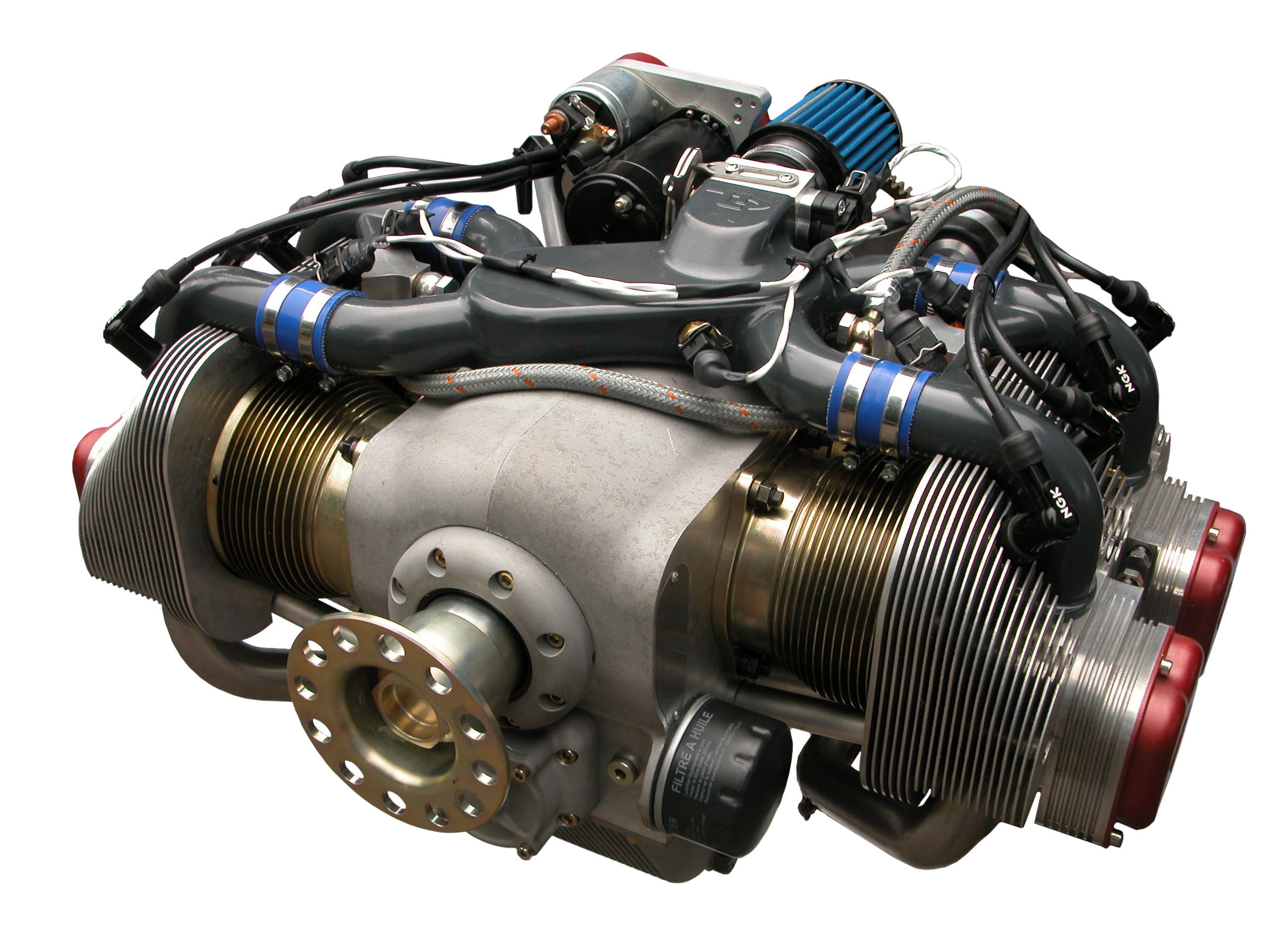
Flat-four aircraft engine

The CHT sender usually has a K-type thermocouple that is mounted under the spark plug. The K-type thermocouple is a pair of two dissimilar metals that produce a small voltage signal when heated. The metal closest to the spark plug is called the hot junction and the other, closest to the head, the cold junction. The ring under the spark plug is used to transfer the heat from the plug to the thermocouple. The gauge and cold junction are usually calibrated at room temperature, 72 °F (22 °C). Because the thermocouple is calibrated for room temperature, the gauge readings will only be 100% accurate at that engine compartment temperature. If the engine compartment temperature is colder, the CHT temperature will display higher. If the engine compartment temperature is higher, the reading will be lower. The error can be corrected with a cold-junction compensating thermistor, which measures the temperature at the cold junction so the gauge can adjust the reading. Low budget gauges do not have this compensating thermistor.

== See also ==
- Timeline of motor and engine technology
- Timeline of heat engine technology
- Engine cooling
