= Extra Aircraft =

German aircraft manufacturer established 1980

Extra Flugzeugbau
- Founded: 1980
- Headquarters: North Rhine-Westphalia, Germany
- Key people: Walter Extra
- Number of employees: 75

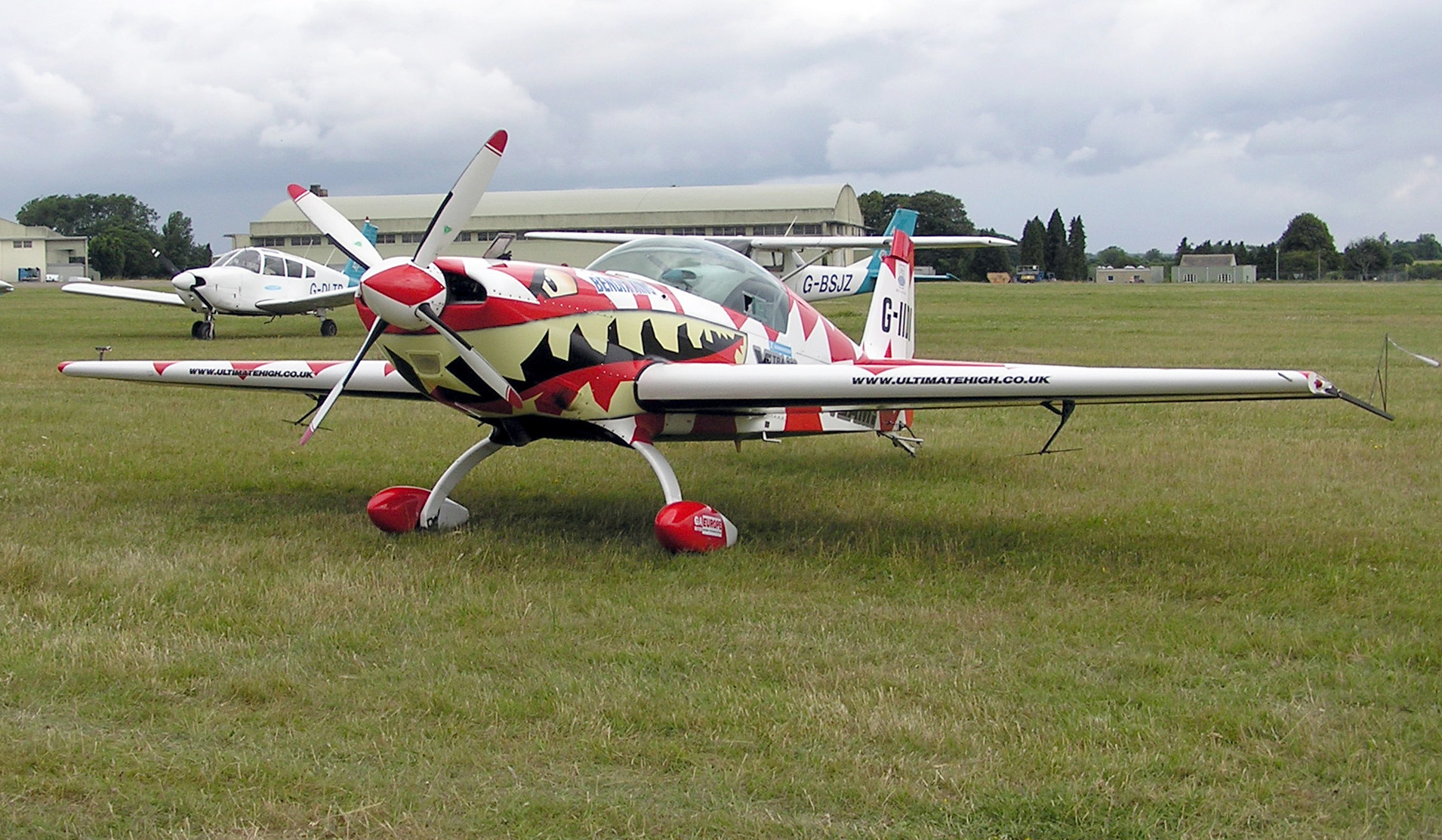
Extra EA-300

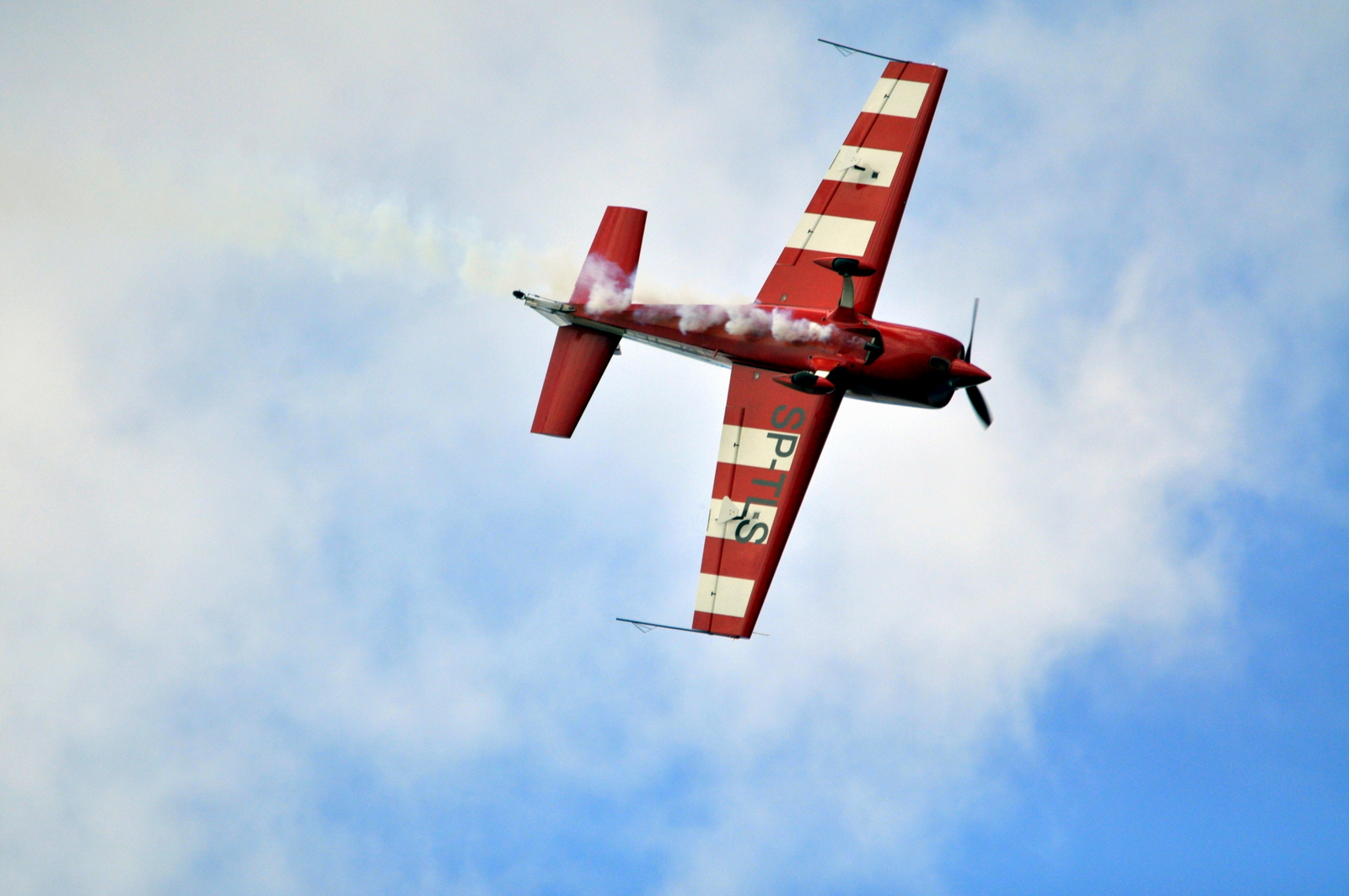
Extra 330LC

The Extra Aircraft company was established in 1980 as Extra Flugzeugbau in Germany by Walter Extra, an aerobatic pilot, to design and develop his own aerobatic aircraft. The company is located at Dinslaken airfield in Hünxe, North Rhine-Westphalia, Germany. Worldwide production of aircraft is about three units per month with a six-month backlog.

== Products ==
=== Aerobatic ===
- Extra EA-200 aerobatic trainer
- Extra EA-230 "Laser" - wooden-winged aerobatic aircraft
- Extra EA-260
- Extra EA-300 two-seat aerobatic aircraft with composite fuselage over steel-frame construction
- Extra EA-330
- Extra NG

=== Tourers ===
- Extra EA-330-LT low-wing variant
- Extra EA-400
- Extra EA-500
