= Extra EA-300 =

German aerobatic aircraft

EA300
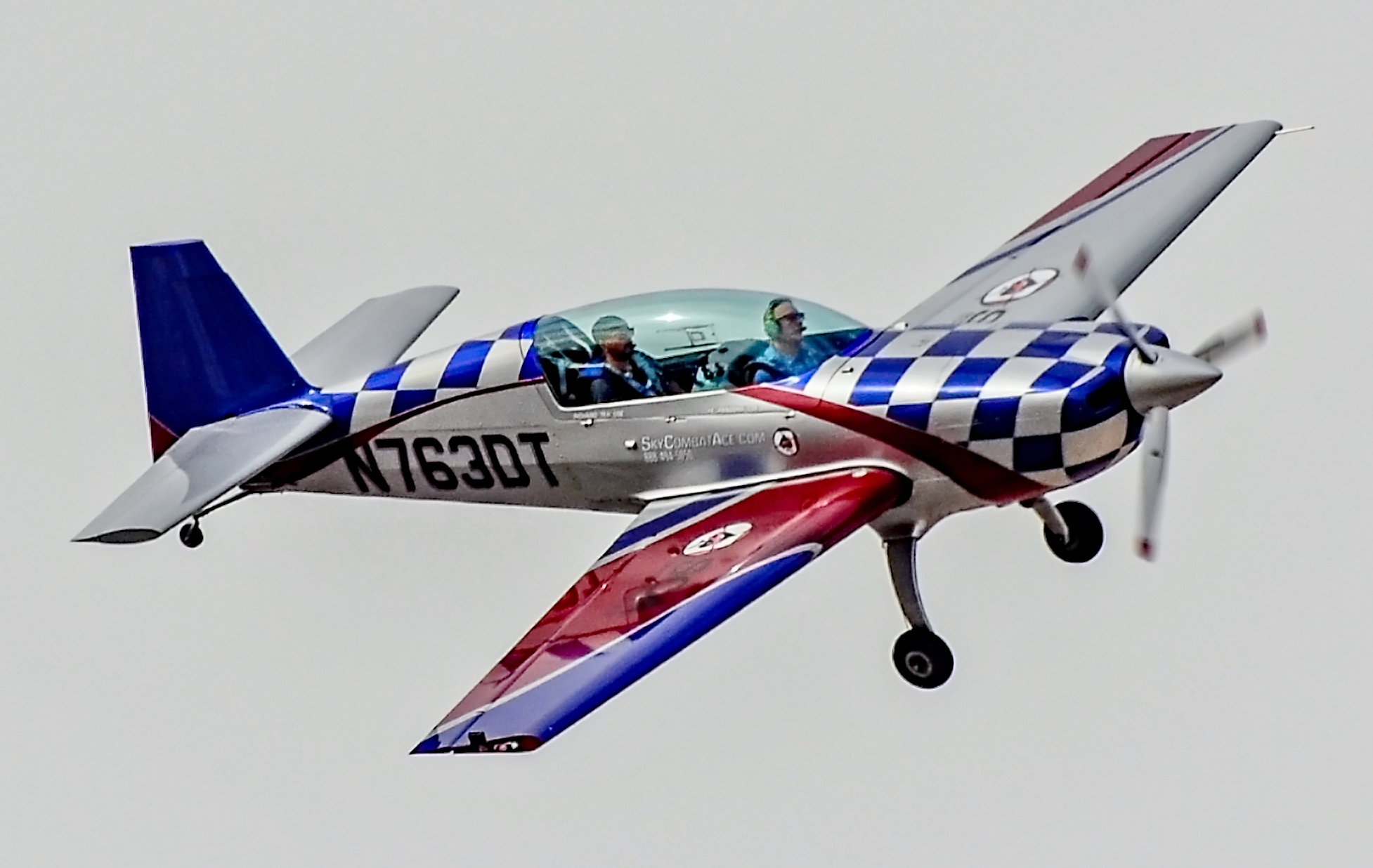
- Extra 300L

General information
- Type: Aerobatic monoplane
- National origin: Germany
- Manufacturer: Extra Flugzeugbau
- Designer: Walter Extra
- Status: Active

History
- Manufactured: 1988-present
- First flight: May 1988

The Extra Flugzeugbau EA-300 is a two-seat aerobatic monoplane capable of Unlimited category competition. It was designed in 1987 by Walter Extra, a German aerobatic pilot, and built by Extra Flugzeugbau.

== Design and development ==
Design of the Extra 300 was based on the Extra 230, an early 1980s monoplane having a wing made of wood. The Extra 300 has a welded steel tube fuselage covered in aluminium and fabric. The midset wing has a carbon fiber composite spar and carbon composite skins. A symmetrical airfoil, mounted with a zero angle of incidence, provides equal performance in both upright and inverted flight. The landing gear is fixed taildragger style with composite main legs and fiberglass wheel pants. The powerplant is a fuel-injected Lycoming AEIO-540 which produces 220 kW (300 hp).

The first two-seat Extra 300 made its maiden flight on 6 May 1988, with German type certification following on 16 May 1990. The single-seat Extra 300S flew on 4 March 1992.

The Extra 300 is stressed for ±10 G with one person on board and ±8 G with two. Some Extra 300s are registered in the experimental category under a Special Certificate of Airworthiness in the U.S., while others are type certified in the aerobatic category.

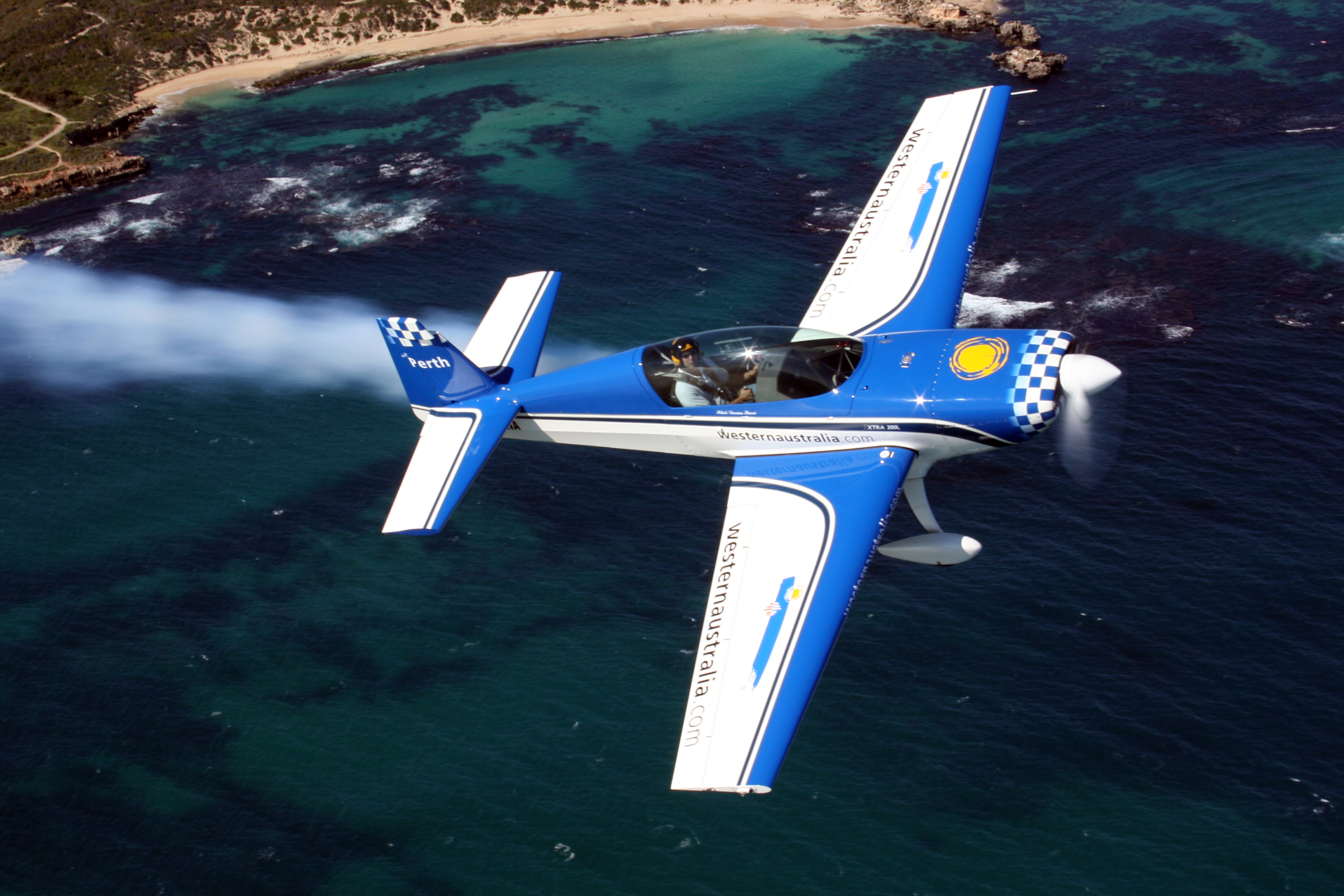
An Extra 300L flying near Perth, Western Australia

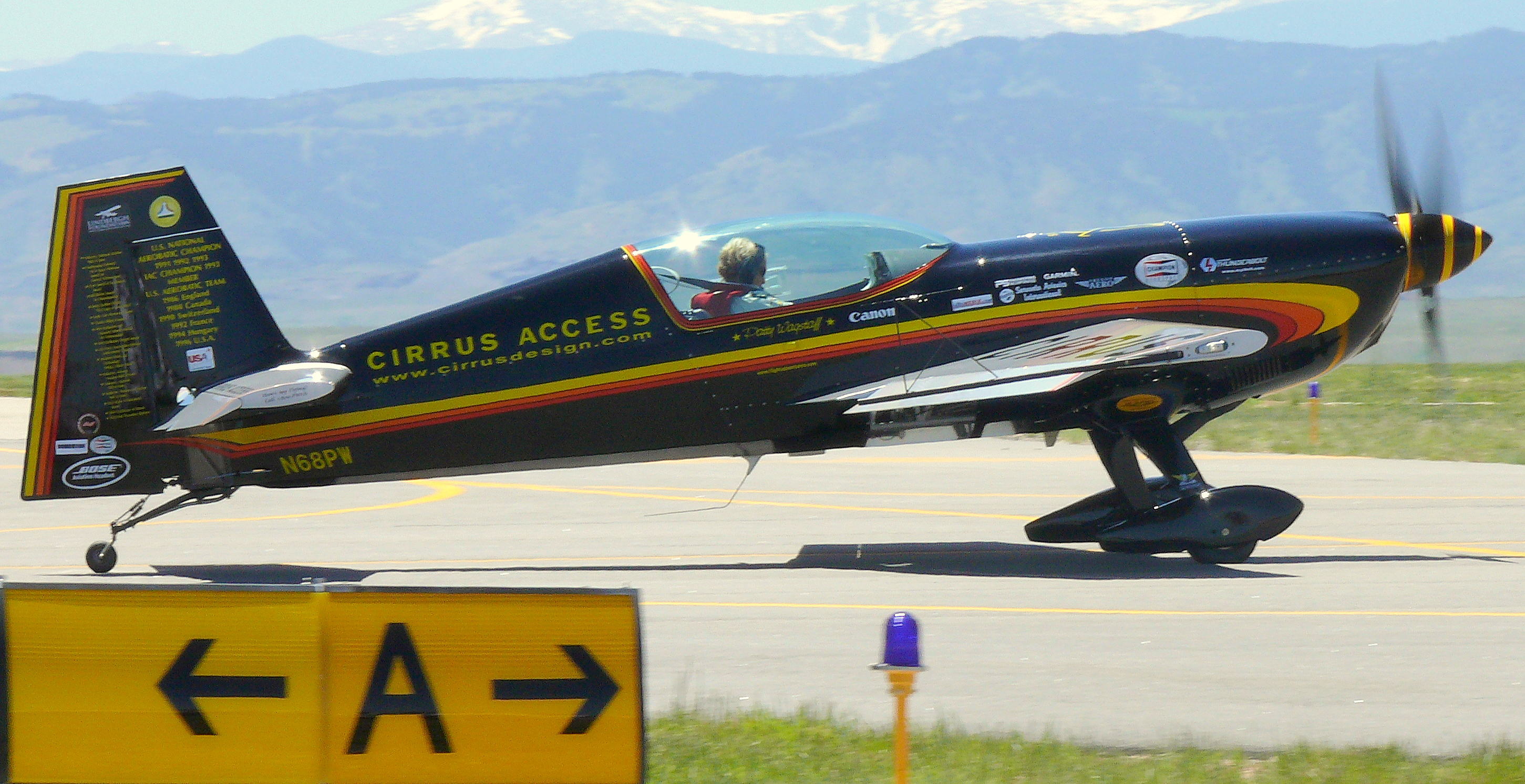
An Extra 300S belonging to Patty Wagstaff: This image shows well the zero-incidence and zero-dihedral wing, used rarely but useful in an aerobatic aircraft.

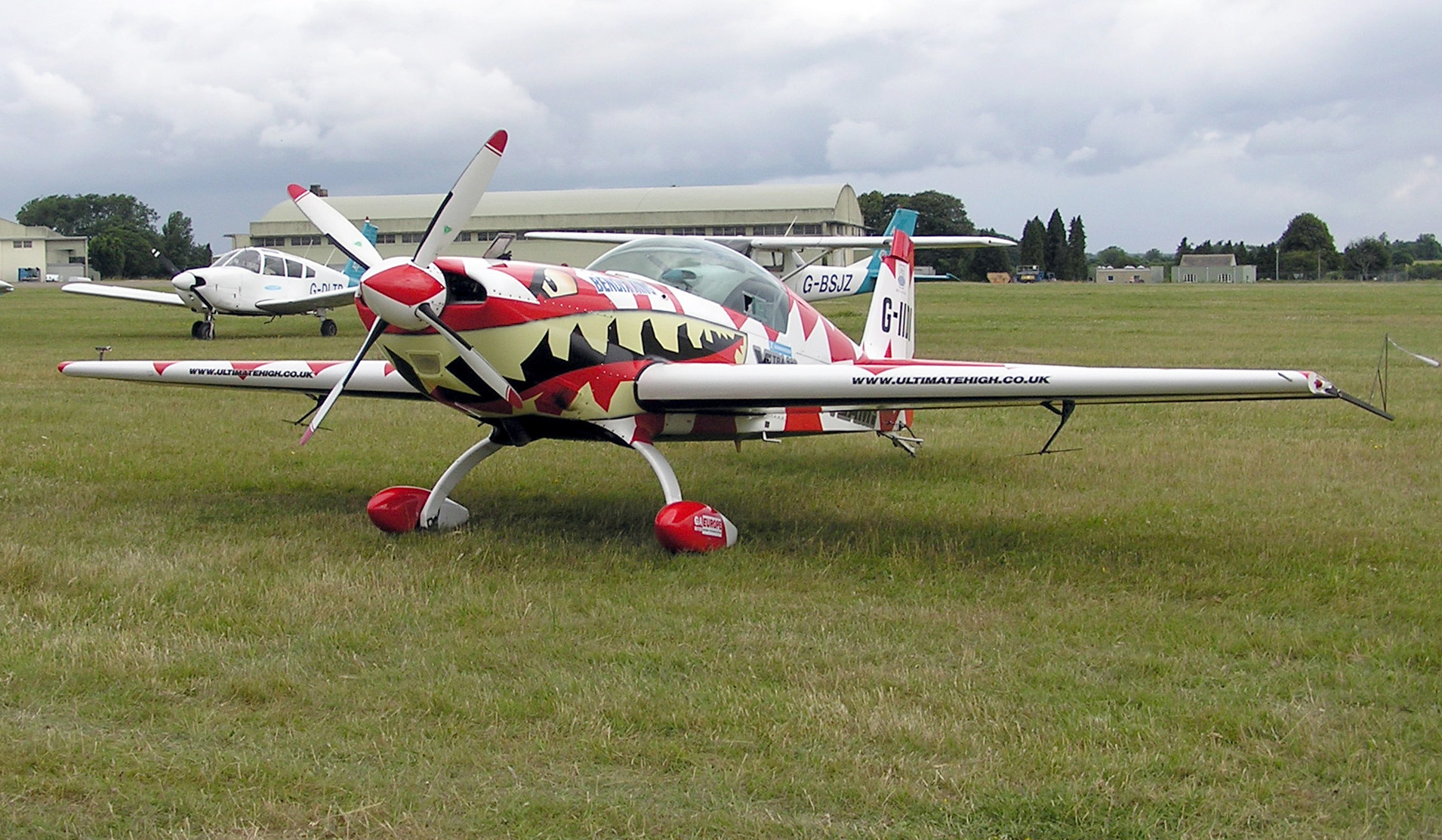
The wing of the Extra 300L is set lower on the fuselage

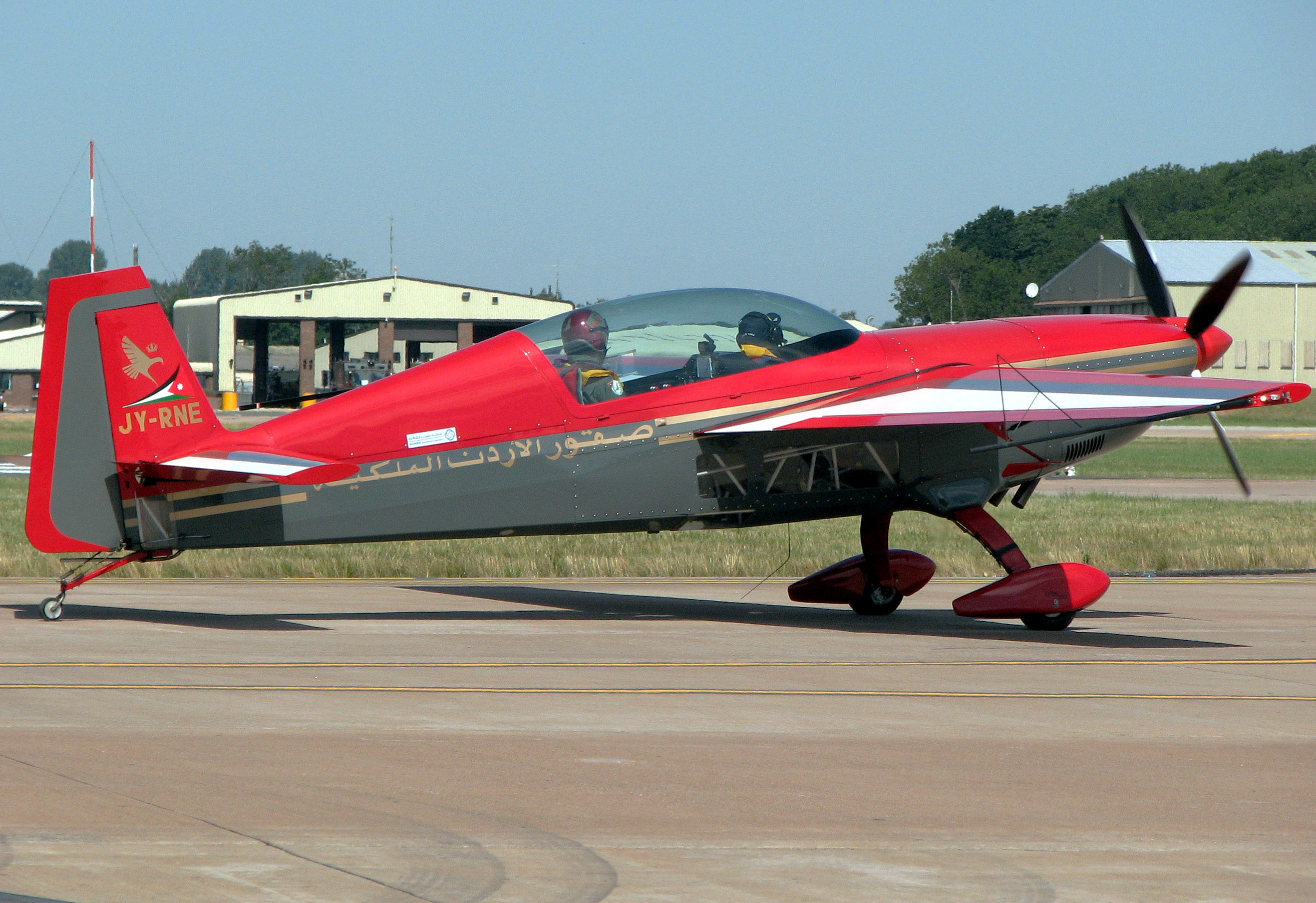
An Extra 300 of the Royal Jordanian Falcons display team taxis for takeoff.

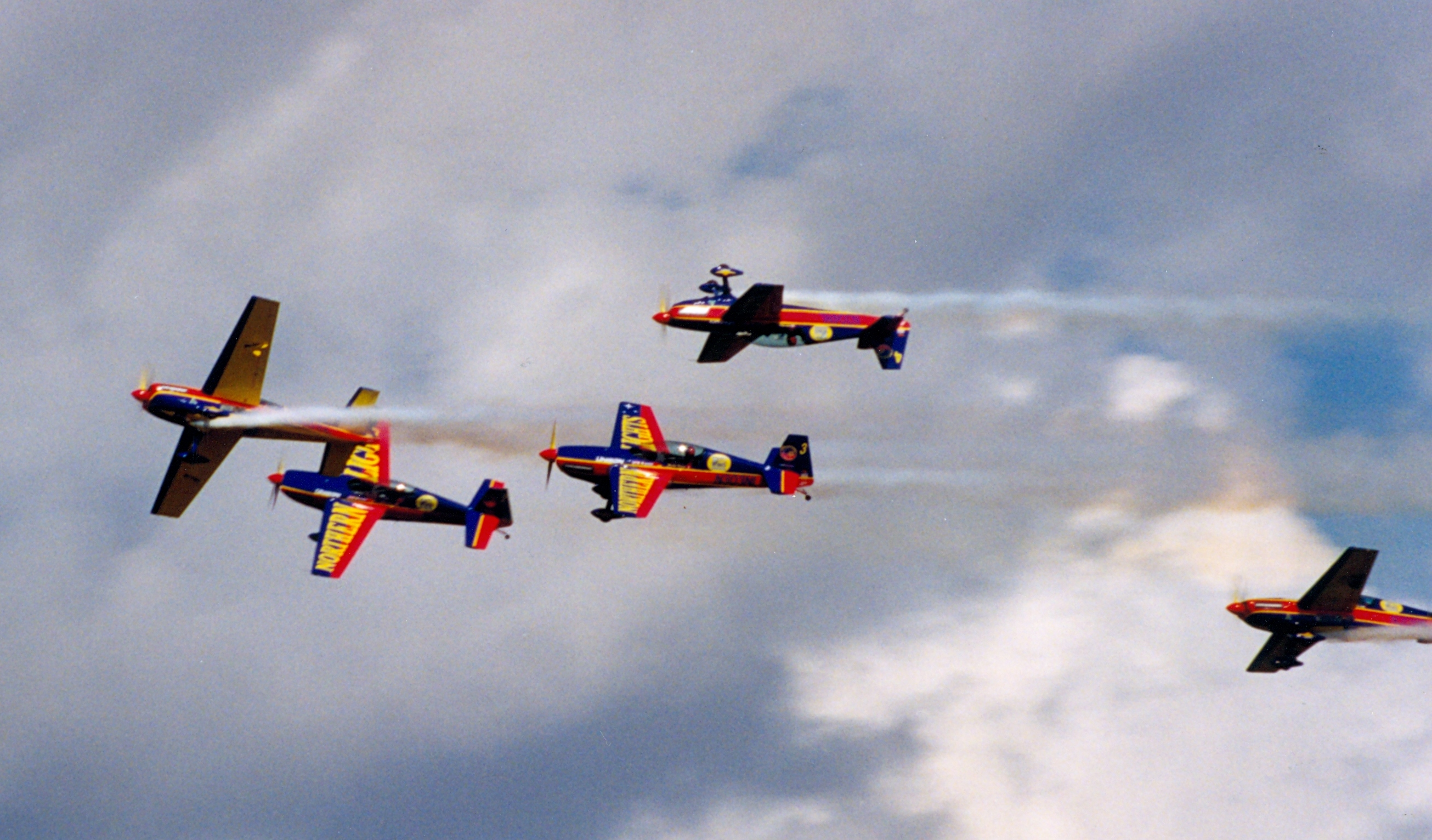
The Northern Lights in formation

== Maintenance and operating costs ==
The Extra EA-300 series, widely used in aerobatic training and competition, has maintenance and operational requirements consistent with its high-performance design.

Regular inspections are mandated to ensure continued airworthiness. A 50-hour inspection typically includes checks on the elevator trim system, while a 1,000-hour inspection involves detailed evaluations of trim tab hinges and actuator levers for wear or damage.

Operating costs include both fixed and variable expenses. The average variable operating cost is approximately US$152.50 per flight hour, including fuel, oil, maintenance, and overhaul reserves. Fuel consumption is typically 62 L (16.5 US gal) per hour ,

== Variants ==
300
Original two-seat version
300S
The 300S is a single-seat version, with a wingspan reduced by 50 cm (19 1/2 in), and fitted with larger ailerons.
300SP
The 300SP is a performance version of the 300S single-seater. Weight was reduced, and the tail of the 330SX installed. It is discontinued, being replaced by the 330SC.
300SHP
The 300SHP (HP = high performance) is an uncertified version of the 300SP with a Lycoming AEIO-580 engine.
300SR
The Extra 300SR is a modified aircraft using a specially designed high-lift wing for the Red Bull Air Race World Series.
300L
The Extra 300L is a Lycoming AEIO-540-powered two-seat aircraft, with low-mounted wing and shorter fuselage. More of these two-seater variants have been produced than any other model. Its wing is mounted at the bottom of the fuselage, with its span reduced from 7.9 to 7.3 m (26 to 24 ft). Improved ailerons boost the 300L's roll rate to 400° per second. All 300Ls are fully certified under FAA and European Joint Aviation Authorities regulations.
300LP
The 300LP (P = performance) is a reduced-weight version of the 300L, redesigned for better performance in competitions and airshows.
330LC
The Extra 330LC (C = carbon) is a refined version of the 330L, with more extensive use of carbon fiber materials, especially in the fuselage and wings. It boasts a top speed of 407 km/h; 220 kn (253 mph) and a ±10 G load factor.
330LX
The Extra 330LX is a high-performance, two-seat aerobatic aircraft powered by a 315 horsepower Lycoming AEIO-580-B1A engine. Designed for advanced aerobatic training and competition, it features a tandem seating arrangement, carbon fiber wing assembly with integral tanks, and a carbon composite empennage structure. The fuselage is constructed from 1.7734 steel, and the aircraft is equipped with a Muehlbauer MTV 9-B-C/C198-25 three-blade propeller. The 330LX offers exceptional aerobatic performance, making it a preferred choice for serious competition pilots and airshow performers.
330LT
The Extra 330LT is a Lycoming AEIO-580 powered two-seat aircraft, adapted for touring. It has an EFIS cockpit and a reduced roll rate in comparison with the 330LX.
330LE
The Extra 330LE is a one-seat aircraft powered by an electric engine made by Siemens, delivering 260 kW (350 hp), for 50 kg. On Thursday, March 23, 2017, the Extra 330LE set two new speed records, said Siemens : "At the Dinslaken Schwarze Heide airfield in Germany, the electric aircraft reached a top speed of around 340 km/h (180 kn; 210 mph) over a distance of 3 km (1.9 mi). On Friday, March 24, 2017, the Extra 330LE gave another premiere performance by becoming the world's first electric aircraft to tow a glider into the sky".
330SC
The Extra 330SC is a Lycoming AEIO-580-powered single-seat aircraft with improved roll rate and easier roll stops, designed specifically for unlimited category competition.
330SX
A development of the 330SC that was first flown in early July 2023, with first deliveries scheduled for 2024. Powered by a Lycoming AEIO-580 engine, it has one seat with a wider cockpit, shorter fuselage, a redesigned cowling, improved control stick clearance and increased headroom over the 330SC.

== Operators ==
=== Civilian ===
- Aviation Performance Solutions is the largest user of Extra 300Ls, with a fleet of eight aircraft used for upset prevention and recovery training (UPRT) in the United States at its bases in Mesa, Arizona and Arlington, Texas.
- The Blades private aerobatic team displays at air shows in Britain using a team of four Extra 300LPs. It offers passenger flights to members of the public and aerobatic training for pilots.
- Patty Wagstaff has flown the Extra 230, 260, and various models of the 300 in aerobatic competitions and airshows since the mid-1980s.
- Aeroclubul României operates eight Extra 300 aircraft, of which three are SC versions and five are L versions. They are mainly used for aerobatic flights under the Hawks of Romania team name at various public events.
- Sky Combat Ace, a U.S.-based aviation adventure company, operates a fleet of Extra 330LC aircraft to offer civilian customers aerobatic flight experiences, including air combat simulations and stunt flying, under the supervision of FAA-certified flight instructors.

=== Military operators ===
Chile

- Chilean Air Force – The Escuadrilla de Alta Acrobacia Halcones ("Chilean Air force High Aerobatics Squadron, called "Hawks") has used the 300L variant since 2003.

France

- French Air and Space Force

Jordan

- Royal Jordanian Air Force
  - The Royal Jordanian Falcons, the aerobatic demonstration team of Royal Jordanian Airlines and the official national aerobatic team of Jordan, perform in a formation of four Extra 300s.

Malaysia

- The Kris Sakti, the Royal Malaysian Air Force aerobatic demonstration team

== Specifications (EA-330LT) ==
Data from EXTRA 330LT

General characteristics

- Crew: 1 or 2
- Length: 7.01 m (23 ft 0 in)
- Wingspan: 8 m (26 ft 3 in)
- Height: 2.6 m (8 ft 6 in)
- Wing area: 10.84 m^{2} (116.7 sq ft)
- Airfoil: root: MA 15S; tip: MA 12S
- Empty weight: 677 kg (1,493 lb) typ. equipped
- Gross weight: 950 kg (2,094 lb) normal category (+6/-3g)
- Max takeoff weight: 820 kg (1,808 lb) single-pilot acro (+10/-10g)
- Fuel capacity: 209 L / 55,2 gal (usable)
- Powerplant: 1 × Lycoming AEIO-580-B1A 6-cylinder air-cooled horizontally-opposed piston engine, 235 kW (315 hp)
- Propellers: 3-bladed Muehlbauer MTV 9-B-C/C198-25

Performance

- Cruise speed: 380 km/h (236 mph, 205 kn) TAS
- Stall speed: 110 km/h (69 mph, 60 kn) at 820 kg / 1,808 lbs
- Never exceed speed: 410 km/h (250 mph, 220 kn)
- g limits: +10/-10g at 820 kg / 1,808 lbs

== See also ==
Related development

- Extra 200

Aircraft of comparable role, configuration, and era

- Corvus Racer 540
- Mudry CAP 230
- MX Aircraft MX2
- Sukhoi Su-26
- Sukhoi Su-29
- Sukhoi Su-31
- Rihn DR-109
- XtremeAir Sbach 342 (XA 42)
- Zivko Edge 540
- Zlín Z-50
