= Walter Extra =

German aviation engineer

Coordinates: 51°36′45″N 06°51′40″E

- Born: April 27, 1954 (age 71)
- Occupations: Aircraft designer and manufacturer

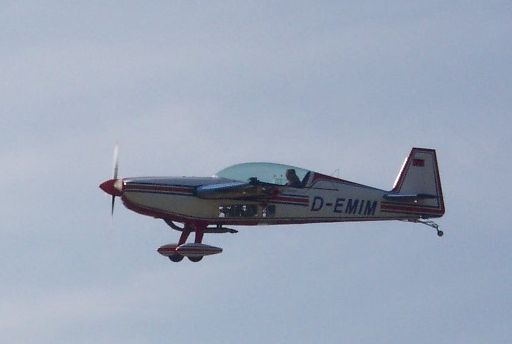
An Extra 300 during landing.

Walter Extra is a German award-winning aerobatic pilot and chief aircraft designer who founded the aerobatic aircraft manufacturer Extra Flugzeugbau (Extra Aircraft Construction).

Extra was trained as a mechanical engineer. He began his flight training in gliders, transitioning to powered aircraft to perform aerobatics. He built and flew a Pitts Special aircraft and later built his own Extra EA-230.

Extra began designing aircraft after competing in the 1982 World Aerobatic Championships. His aircraft constructions revolutionized the aerobatics flying scene and still dominate world competitions. The German pilot Klaus Schrodt won his world championship title flying an aircraft made by the Extra firm.

Walter Extra has designed a series of performance aircraft which include unlimited aerobatic aircraft and turboprop transports.
